= List of flora of Greenland =

The flora of Greenland consists of a total of 583 species or 614 taxa (species and subspecies) of vascular plants, of which 13 are endemic, and 87 taxa introduced by humans, most of which are naturalized.

== Apiaceae ==
- Angelica archangelica – native
- Carum carvi – introduced
- Ligusticum scoticum ssp. scoticum – native

== Aspleniaceae ==
- Asplenium viride – native

== Asteraceae ==
- Achillea millefolium ssp. millefolium – introduced
- Antennaria affinis – native, endemic (microspecies)
- Antennaria alpina
- Antennaria angustata – native
- Antennaria boecherana – native, endemic (microspecies)
- Antennaria canescens – native
- Antennaria compacta – native
- Antennaria friesiana – native
- Antennaria glabrata – native
- Antennaria hansii – native, endemic (microspecies)
- Antennaria intermedia – native, endemic (microspecies)
- Antennaria porsildii – native
- Antennaria sornborgeri – native
- Antennaria subcanescens – native
- Arnica angustifolia ssp. angustifolia – native
- Artemisia borealis ssp. borealis – native
- Artemisia vulgaris – introduced
- Chamomilla recutita – introduced
- Chamomilla suaveolens – introduced
- Cirsium arvense – introduced
- Cirsium helenioides – native, locally extinct
- Crepis tectorum ssp. tectorum – introduced
- Erigeron borealis – native
- Erigeron compositus – native
- Erigeron humilis – native
- Erigeron uniflorus ssp. eriocephalus – native
- Erigeron uniflorus ssp. uniflorus – native
- Filaginella uliginosa – introduced
- Hieracium sect. Alpina – native
- Hieracium sect. Prenanthoidea – native
- Hieracium sect. Subalpina – native
- Hieracium sect. Tridentata – native
- Leontodon autumnalis ssp. autumnalis – introduced (Norsemen)
- Leucanthemum vulgare – introduced
- Matricaria maritima ssp. phaeocephala – native
- Matricaria perforata – introduced
- Omalotheca norvegica – native
- Omalotheca supina – native
- Senecio vulgaris – introduced
- Taraxacum sect. Arctica – native
- Taraxacum sect. Borealia – native
- Taraxacum sect. Spectabilia – native

== Betulaceae ==
- Alnus viridis ssp. crispa – native
- Betula glandulosa – native
- Betula nana ssp. nana – native
- Betula pubescens ssp. minor – native

== Boraginaceae ==
- Asperugo procumbens – introduced
- Mertensia maritima – native
- Myosotis arvensis – introduced

== Brassicaceae ==
- Arabidopsis arenicola – native
- Arabis alpina – native
- Barbarea stricta – introduced
- Barbarea vulgaris – introduced
- Beringia bursifolia – native
- Boechera holboellii – native
- Brassica rapa ssp. sylvestris – introduced
- Braya humilis ssp. arctica – native
- Braya intermedia – native
- Braya linearis – native
- Braya novae-angliae – native
- Braya purpurascens – native
- Braya thorild-wulffii – native
- Cakile edentula ssp. edentula – native
- Capsella bursa-pastoris – introduced
- Cardamine bellidifolia – native
- Cardamine pratensis ssp. polemonioides – native
- Cardaminopsis arenosa – introduced
- Cochlearia groenlandica – native
- Descurainia sophia – introduced
- Draba alpina – native
- Draba arctica ssp. ostenfeldii – native, endemic (subspecies)
- Draba arctica ssp. arctica – native
- Draba arctogena – native
- Draba aurea – native
- Draba cana – native
- Draba cinerea – native
- Draba corymbosa – native
- Draba crassifolia – native
- Draba fladnizensis – native
- Draba glabella – native
- Draba incana – native
- Draba micropetala – native
- Draba nivalis – native
- Draba norvegica – native
- Draba oblongata – native
- Draba oxycarpa – native
- Draba pauciflora – native
- Draba sibirica – native
- Draba subcapitata – native
- Draba wahlenbergii – native
- Erysimum redowskii(syn. E. pallasii) – native
- Eutrema edwardsii – native
- Lesquerella arctica – native
- Raphanus raphanistrum – introduced
- Rorippa islandica ssp. islandica – native
- Rorippa palustris ssp. palustris – introduced
- Rorippa sylvestris – introduced
- Sinapis arvensis – introduced
- Sisymbrium altissimum – introduced
- Subularia aquatica ssp. americana – native
- Thlaspi arvense – introduced

== Callitrichaceae ==
- Callitriche anceps – native
- Callitriche hamulata – native
- Callitriche hermaphroditica – native
- Callitriche palustris – native

== Calochortaceae ==
- Streptopus amplexifolius ssp. americanus – native

== Campanulaceae ==
- Campanula gieseckiana – native
- Campanula uniflora – native

== Caryophyllaceae ==
- Arenaria humifusa – native
- Arenaria pseudofrigida – native
- Cerastium alpinum ssp. lanatum – native
- Cerastium alpinum ssp. alpinum – native
- Cerastium arcticum – native
- Cerastium arvense – native
- Cerastium beeringianum – native
- Cerastium cerastoides – native
- Cerastium fontanum ssp. vulgare – introduced
- Cerastium fontanum ssp. fontanum – native
- Cerastium regelii – native
- Honckenya peploides ssp. diffusa – native
- Lychnis alpina ssp. americana – native
- Minuartia biflora – native
- Minuartia groenlandica – native
- Minuartia rossii ssp. rossiii – native
- Minuartia rubella – native
- Minuartia stricta – native
- Sagina cespitosa – native
- Sagina nivalis – native
- Sagina nodosa – native
- Sagina procumbens – native
- Sagina saginoides – native
- Silene acaulis – native
- Silene furcata ssp. angustiflora – native
- Silene furcata ssp. furcata – native
- Silene latifolia ssp. alba – introduced
- Silene sorensenis – native
- Silene uralensis ssp. uralensis – native
- Silene vulgaris – introduced
- Spergula arvensis – introduced
- Spergularia canadensis – native
- Stellaria borealis – native
- Stellaria humifusa – native
- Stellaria longifolia – native
- Stellaria longipes – native
- Stellaria media – introduced

== Chenopodiaceae ==
- Atriplex longipes ssp. praecox – native
- Atriplex patula – introduced
- Chenopodium album – introduced

== Cornaceae ==
- Cornus canadensis – native
- Cornus suecica – native
- Cornus × unalaschkensis – native (hybrid)

== Crassulaceae ==
- Rhodiola rosea ssp. rosea – native
- Sedum acre – native
- Sedum annuum – native
- Sedum villosum – native

== Cupressaceae ==
- Juniperus communis ssp. nana – native

== Cyperaceae ==
- Carex acuta – native
- Carex aquatilis ssp. aquatilis – native
- Carex aquatilis ssp. stans – native
- Carex arctogena – native
- Carex atrata – native
- Carex atrofusca – native
- Carex bicolor – native
- Carex bigelowii ssp. bigelowii – native
- Carex bigelowii ssp. rigida – native
- Carex boecheriana – native
- Carex brunnescens ssp. brunnescens – native
- Carex buxbaumii – native
- Carex capillaris ssp. fuscidula – native
- Carex capillaris ssp. chlorostachys – native
- Carex capitata – native
- Carex chordorrhiza – native
- Carex curta – native
- Carex deflexa – native
- Carex demissa – native
- Carex disperma – native
- Carex fuliginosa ssp. misandra – native
- Carex glacialis – native
- Carex glareosa – native
- Carex gynocrates – native
- Carex holostoma – native
- Carex krausei ssp. porsildiana – native
- Carex lachenalii – native
- Carex lidii – native
- Carex lyngbyei ssp. lyngbyei – native
- Carex mackenziei – native
- Carex macloviana – native
- Carex magellanica ssp. irrigua – native
- Carex marina ssp. marina – native
- Carex marina ssp. pseudolagopina – native
- Carex maritima – native
- Carex membranacea
- Carex microglochin – native
- Carex miliaris
- Carex nardina ssp. hepburnii – native
- Carex nigra ssp. nigra – native
- Carex norvegica – native
- Carex panicea – native
- Carex parallela ssp. parallela – native
- Carex praticola – native
- Carex quasivaginata – native
- Carex rariflora – native
- Carex rhomalea
- Carex rostrata – native
- Carex rufina – native
- Carex rupestris – native
- Carex salina – native
- Carex miliaris – native
- Carex scirpoidea – native
- Carex stylosa – native
- Carex subspathacea ssp. subspathacea – native
- Carex supina ssp. spaniocarpa – native
- Carex trisperma – native
- Carex umbellata – native
- Carex ursina – native
- Eleocharis acicularis ssp. acicularis – native
- Eleocharis palustris – native
- Eleocharis quinqueflora ssp. fernaldii – native
- Eleocharis uniglumis – native
- Eriophorum angustifolium – native
- Eriophorum callitrix – native
- Eriophorum scheuchzeri – native
- Eriophorum × sorenseni – native
- Eriophorum triste – native
- Eriophorum vaginatum ssp. spissum – native
- Kobresia myosuroides – native
- Kobresia simpliciuscula ssp. subholarctica – native
- Trichophorum cespitosum – native

== Diapensiaceae ==
- Diapensia lapponica ssp. lapponica – native

== Droseraceae ==
- Drosera rotundifolia – native

== Dryopteridaceae ==
- Dryopteris expansa – native
- Dryopteris filix-mas – native
- Dryopteris fragrans – native
- Dryopteris marginalis – native
- Polystichum lonchitis – native

== Empetraceae ==
- Empetrum nigrum ssp. hermaphroditum – native

== Equisetaceae ==
- Equisetum arvense ssp. arvense – native
- Equisetum arvense ssp. boreale – native
- Equisetum hyemale – native
- Equisetum scirpoides – native
- Equisetum sylvaticum – native
- Equisetum variegatum ssp. variegatum – native

== Ericaceae ==
- Andromeda polifolia ssp. glaucophylla – native
- Andromeda polifolia ssp. polifolia – native
- Arctostaphylos alpinus – native
- Arctostaphylos uva-ursi – native
- Cassiope tetragona – native
- Harrimanella hypnoides – native
- Ledum groenlandicum – native
- Ledum palustre ssp. decumbens – native
- Loiseleuria procumbens – native
- Orthilia obtusata – native
- Phyllodoce caerulea – native
- Pyrola grandiflora – native
- Pyrola minor – native
- Rhododendron lapponicum – native
- Vaccinium myrtillus – native
- Vaccinium oxycoccos ssp. microphyllus – native
- Vaccinium uliginosum ssp. microphyllum – native
- Vaccinium vitis-idaea ssp. minus – native
- ×Ledodendron vanhoeffeni – native, endemic (intergeneric hybrid)

== Fabaceae ==
- Astragalus alpinus ssp. arcticus – probably introduced
- Lathyrus japonicus – native
- Lathyrus pratensis – introduced
- Medicago lupulina – introduced
- Trifolium hybridum – casual
- Trifolium pratense – introduced
- Trifolium repens – introduced
- Vicia cracca – introduced (Norsemen)
- Vicia hirsuta – introduced
- Vicia sativa ssp. nigra – introduced
- Vicia sepium – introduced

== Gentianaceae ==
- Gentiana nivalis – native
- Gentianella amarella ssp. acuta – native
- Gentianella aurea – native
- Gentianella detonsa – native
- Gentianella tenella – native
- Lomatogonium rotatum – native

== Geraniaceae ==
- Erodium cicutarium – introduced
- Geranium pusillum – introduced
- Geranium sylvaticum – native

== Haloragaceae ==
- Myriophyllum alterniflorum – native
- Myriophyllum sibiricum – (Haloragaceae) - native

== Hippuridaceae ==
- Hippuris vulgaris – native

== Iridaceae ==
- Sisyrinchium montanum – native

== Isoetaceae ==
- Isoetes echinospora ssp. muricata – native
- Isoetes lacustris – native

== Juncaceae ==
- Juncus alpinoarticulatus ssp. alpestris – native
- Juncus arcticus ssp. arcticus – native
- Juncus biglumis – native
- Juncus bufonius ssp. bufonius – introduced
- Juncus bufonius ssp. ranarius – native
- Juncus castaneus ssp. castaneus – native
- Juncus filiformis – native
- Juncus gerardii ssp. gerardii – native
- Juncus squarrosus – native
- Juncus subtilis – native
- Juncus trifidus – native
- Juncus triglumis ssp. albescens – native
- Juncus triglumis ssp. triglumis – native
- Luzula nivalis – native
- Luzula arcuata – native
- Luzula confusa – native
- Luzula groenlandica – native
- Luzula multiflora ssp. frigida – native
- Luzula multiflora ssp. multiflora – native
- Luzula parviflora ssp. parviflora – native
- Luzula spicata – native
- Luzula wahlenbergii – native

== Juncaginaceae ==
- Triglochin palustris – native

== Lamiaceae ==
- Lamium amplexicaule – introduced
- Lamium moluccellifolium – introduced
- Lamium purpureum – introduced
- Thymus praecox ssp. arcticus – native

== Lentibulariaceae ==
- Pinguicula vulgaris – native
- Utricularia intermedia – native
- Utricularia minor – native
- Utricularia ochroleuca – native

== Linnaeaceae ==
- Linnaea borealis ssp. americana – native

== Lycopodiaceae ==
- Diphasiastrum alpinum – native
- Diphasiastrum complanatum – native
- Diphasiastrum sitchense – native
- Diphasiastrum x zeilleri – native
- Huperzia arctica – native
- Huperzia selago – native
- Lycopodium annotinum ssp. annotinum – native
- Lycopodium dubium – native
- Lycopodium lagopus – native

== Malaceae ==
- Sorbus groenlandica – native

== Melanthiaceae ==
- Tofieldia coccinea – native
- Tofieldia pusilla – native

== Menyanthaceae ==
- Menyanthes trifoliata – native

== Myrsinaceae ==
- Anagallis arvensis – introduced
- Trientalis europaea – native

== Onagraceae ==
- Chamaenerion latifolium – native
- Epilobium anagallidifolium – native
- Epilobium angustifolium – native
- Epilobium davuricum ssp. arcticum – native
- Epilobium hornemannii – native
- Epilobium lactiflorum – native
- Epilobium latifolium – native
- Epilobium palustre – native

== Ophioglossaceae ==
- Botrychium boreale – native
- Botrychium lanceolatum – native
- Botrychium lunaria – native
- Botrychium minganense – native
- Botrychium multifidum – native
- Botrychium simplex – native
- Ophioglossum azoricum – native

== Orchidaceae ==
- Amerorchis rotundifolia – native
- Corallorhiza trifida – native
- Neottia cordata – native
- Platanthera hyperborea – native
- Pseudorchis straminea – native

== Orobanchaceae ==
- Bartsia alpina – native
- Euphrasia frigida – native
- Melampyrum sylvaticum – native
- Pedicularis capitata – native
- Pedicularis lanata – native
- Pedicularis flammea – native
- Pedicularis groenlandica – native
- Pedicularis hirsuta – native
- Pedicularis labradorica – native
- Pedicularis langsdorfii – native
- Pedicularis lapponica – native
- Pedicularis sudetica ssp. albolabiata – native
- Rhinanthus minor ssp. groenlandicus – native
- Rhinanthus minor ssp. minor – native

== Papaveraceae ==
- Papaver dahlianum – native
- Papaver cornwallisense
- Papaver dahlianum
- Papaver labradoricum
- Papaver lapponicum

== Parnassiaceae ==
- Parnassia kotzebuei – native

== Plantaginaceae ==
- Plantago coronopus – casual
- Plantago lanceolata – introduced
- Plantago major – introduced
- Plantago maritima ssp. borealis – native
- Veronica alpina ssp. alpina – native
- Veronica alpina ssp. pumila – native
- Veronica arvensis – casual
- Veronica fruticans – native
- Veronica officinalis – introduced
- Veronica persica – casual
- Veronica serpyllifolia ssp. serpyllifolia – introduced
- Veronica wormskjoldii – native

== Plumbaginaceae ==
- Armeria maritima ssp. maritima – native
- Armeria maritima ssp. sibirica – native

== Poaceae ==
- Agrostis canina – native
- Agrostis capillaris – introduced
- Agrostis gigantea – native
- Agrostis mertensii – native
- Agrostis scabra – native
- Agrostis stolonifera – native
- Agrostis vinealis – native
- Alopecurus aequalis – native
- Alopecurus alpinus ssp. borealis – native
- Alopecurus geniculatus – introduced
- Alopecurus pratensis – introduced
- Anthoxanthum alpinum – native
- Arctagrostis latifolia ssp. latifolia – native
- Arctophila fulva – native
- Avenella flexuosa – native
- Bromus hordeaceus – introduced
- Bromus tectorum – introduced
- Calamagrostis canadensis ssp. langsdorfii – native
- Calamagrostis inexpansa – native
- Calamagrostis lapponica – native
- Calamagrostis neglecta ssp. neglecta – native
- Calamagrostis neglecta ssp. groenlandica – native
- Calamagrostis purpurascens var. purpurascens – native
- Calamagrostis purpurascens var. laricina – native
- Catabrosa aquatica – native
- Dactylis glomerata – introduced
- Danthonia spicata – native
- Deschampsia alpina – native
- Deschampsia brevifolia – native
- Deschampsia cespitosa – introduced
- Deschampsia sukatschewii ssp. borealis – native
- Dupontia fisheri – native
- Elymus alaskanus ssp. hyperarcticus – native
- Elymus repens – introduced
- Elymus trachycaulus ssp. virescens – native, endemic (subspecies)
- Elymus violaceus – native
- Festuca baffinensis – native
- Festuca brachyphylla – native
- Festuca edlundiae – native
- Festuca groenlandica – native, endemic
- Festuca hyperborea – native
- Festuca pratensis – introduced
- Festuca rubra spp. fallax – introduced
- Festuca rubra ssp. arctica – native
- Festuca rubra spp. rubra – native
- Festuca saximontana – native
- Festuca vivipara ssp. hirsuta – native
- Festuca vivipara ssp. vivipara – native
- Festuca vivipara ssp. glabra – native
- Hierochloë alpina – native
- Hierochloë odorata ssp. arctica – native
- Leymus arenarius – native
- Leymus mollis ssp. mollis – native
- Lolium perenne – introduced
- Nardus stricta – native
- Phippsia algida ssp. algidiformis – native
- Phippsia algida ssp. algida – native
- Phleum alpinum – native
- Phleum pratense ssp. pratense – native
- Pleuropogon sabinei – native
- Poa abbreviata – native
- Poa alpina – native
- Poa annua – introduced
- Poa arctica ssp. arctica – native
- Poa arctica ssp. caespitans – native
- Poa flexuosa – native
- Poa glauca – native
- Poa hartzii – native
- Poa nemoralis – native
- Poa palustris – introduced
- Poa pratensis – native
- Poa pratensis ssp. alpigena – native
- Poa pratensis ssp. colpodea – native
- Poa pratensis ssp. irrigata – native
- Poa trivialis – introduced
- Puccinellia andersonii – native
- Puccinellia angustata – native
- Puccinellia bruggemannii – native
- Puccinellia capillaris – native
- Puccinellia deschampsioides – native
- Puccinellia groenlandica – native, endemic
- Puccinellia laurentiana – native
- Puccinellia maritima – native
- Puccinellia nutkaensis – native
- Puccinellia phryganodes – native
- Puccinellia porsildii – native
- Puccinellia pumila – native
- Puccinellia rosenkrantzii – native, endemic
- Puccinellia tenella ssp. langeana – native
- Puccinellia vaginata – native
- Puccinellia vahliana – native
- Trisetum spicatum – native
- Vahlodea atropurpurea – native

== Polemoniaceae ==
- Polemonium boreale – native

== Polygalaceae ==
- Polygala serpyllifolia – probably introduced

== Polygonaceae ==
- Bistorta vivipara – native
- Fallopia convolvulus – introduced
- Koenigia islandica – native
- Oxyria digyna – native
- Persicaria lapathifolia – introduced
- Persicaria maculosa – introduced
- Polygonum aviculare ssp. boreale – introduced
- Rumex acetosella ssp. acetosella – introduced
- Rumex acetosella ssp. tenuifolius – native
- Rumex acetosella ssp. arenicola – native
- Rumex alpestris ssp. lapponicus – native
- Rumex longifolius – introduced
- Rumex obtusifolius – introduced

== Polypodiaceae ==
- Polypodium sibiricum – native

== Portulacaceae ==
- Montia fontana – native

== Potamogetonaceae ==
- Potamogeton alpinus ssp. tenuifolius – native
- Potamogeton gramineus – native
- Potamogeton groenlandicus – native, endemic
- Potamogeton natans – native
- Potamogeton perfoliatus ssp. perfoliatus – native
- Potamogeton praelongus – native
- Stuckenia filiformis ssp. alpina – native
- Stuckenia filiformis ssp. filiformis – native

== Primulaceae ==
- Androsace septentrionalis – native
- Primula egaliksensis – native
- Primula stricta – native

== Ranunculaceae ==
- Anemone richardsonii – native
- Batrachium confervoides – native
- Coptis trifoliata – native
- Ranunculus acris ssp. acris – native
- Ranunculus arcticus – native
- Ranunculus auricomus – native
- Ranunculus cymbalaria – native
- Ranunculus glacialis – native
- Ranunculus hyperboreus ssp. hyperboreus – native
- Ranunculus lapponicus – native
- Ranunculus nivalis – native
- Ranunculus pygmaeus – native
- Ranunculus repens – introduced
- Ranunculus reptans – native
- Ranunculus sabinei – native
- Ranunculus subrigidus
- Ranunculus sulphureus – native
- Thalictrum alpinum – native

== Rosaceae ==
- Acomastylis rossii – native
- Alchemilla alpina – native
- Alchemilla filicaulis – native
- Alchemilla glomerulans – native
- Alchemilla vestita – native
- Alchemilla wichurae – native
- Argentina anserina – native
- Argentina egedei ssp. egedei – native
- Comarum palustre – native
- Dryas integrifolia – native
- Dryas octopetala ssp. punctata – native
- Geum rivale – native
- Potentilla chamissonis – native
- Potentilla crantzii – native
- Potentilla hookeriana – native
- Potentilla hyparctica ssp. hyparctica – native
- Potentilla insularis – native
- Potentilla nivea ssp. nivea – native
- Potentilla nivea ssp. subquinata – native
- Potentilla norvegica ssp. norvegica – introduced
- Potentilla pulchella ssp. pulchella – native
- Potentilla ranunculus – native
- Potentilla rubella – native, endemic
- Potentilla rubricaulis – native
- Potentilla stipularis – native
- Potentilla vahliana – native
- Rubus chamaemorus – native
- Rubus idaeus ssp. idaeus – native
- Rubus saxatilis – native
- Sibbaldia procumbens – native
- Sibbaldiopsis tridentata – native

== Rubiaceae ==
- Galium album – introduced
- Galium aparine – introduced
- Galium boreale – native
- Galium brandegei – native
- Galium triflorum – native
- Galium uliginosum – introduced
- Galium verum – introduced

== Salicaceae ==
- Salix arctica – native
- Salix arctophila – native
- Salix glauca ssp. callicarpaea – native
- Salix glauca ssp. glauca – native
- Salix herbacea – native
- Salix reticulata – native
- Salix uva-ursi – native

== Saxifragaceae ==
- Chrysosplenium tetrandrum – native
- Micranthes stellaris, syn. Saxifraga stellaris – native
- Saxifraga aizoides – native
- Saxifraga cernua – native
- Saxifraga cespitosa ssp. cespitosa – native
- Saxifraga foliolosa – native
- Saxifraga hieracifolia – native
- Saxifraga hirculus – native
- Saxifraga hyperborea – native
- Saxifraga nathorstii – native, endemic
- Saxifraga nivalis – native
- Saxifraga oppositifolia ssp. oppositifolia – native
- Saxifraga paniculata – native
- Saxifraga platysepala – native
- Saxifraga rivularis – native
- Saxifraga rosacea – native
- Saxifraga tenuis – native
- Saxifraga tricuspidata – native

== Scrophulariaceae ==
- Limosella aquatica – native
- Linaria vulgaris – introduced
- Verbascum thapsus – casual

== Selaginellaceae ==
- Selaginella rupestris – native
- Selaginella selaginoides – native

== Sparganiaceae ==
- Sparganium angustifolium – native
- Sparganium hyperboreum – native

== Thelypteridaceae ==
- Phegopteris connectilis – native

== Urticaceae ==
- Urtica dioica ssp. dioica – introduced
- Urtica urens – introduced

== Violaceae ==
- Viola adunca – native
- Viola arvensis – introduced
- Viola canina ssp. montana – native
- Viola palustris – native
- Viola selkirkii – native

== Woodsiaceae ==
- Athyrium distentifolium ssp. americanum – native
- Athyrium filix-femina ssp. angustum – native
- Cystopteris fragilis – native
- Cystopteris montana – native
- Gymnocarpium dryopteris – native
- Woodsia alpina – native
- Woodsia glabella – native
- Woodsia ilvensis – native

== Zosteraceae ==
- Zostera marina – native
