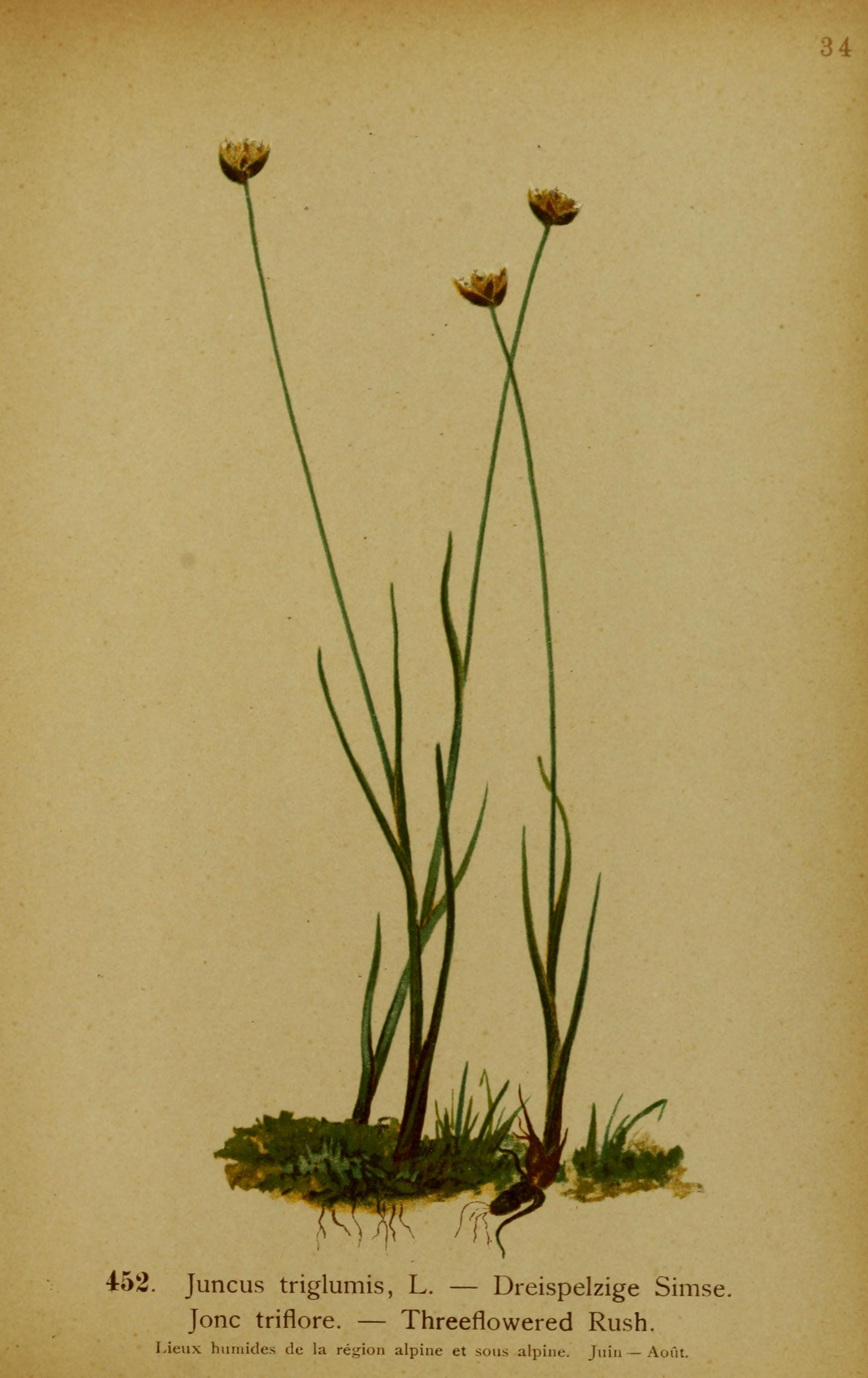
- Botanical illustration
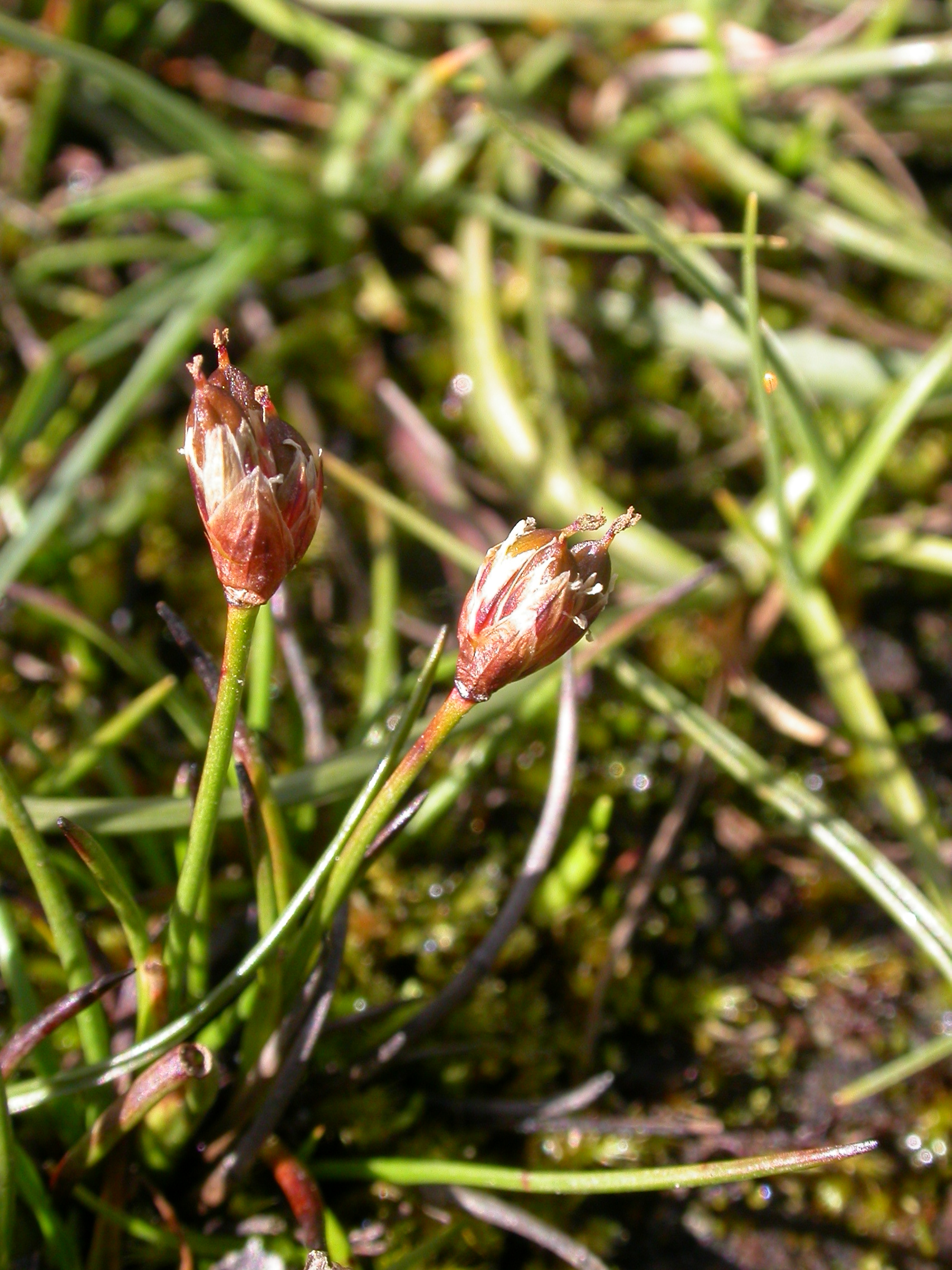
- Habit

Scientific classification
- Kingdom: Plantae
- Clade: Embryophytes
- Clade: Tracheophytes
- Clade: Spermatophytes
- Clade: Angiosperms
- Clade: Monocots
- Clade: Commelinids
- Order: Poales
- Family: Juncaceae
- Genus: Juncus
- Species: J. triglumis

Binomial name
- Juncus triglumis L.

Synonyms
- List: Juncus albescens (Lange) Fernald; Juncus hancockii Hance; Juncus pyrenaicus Cadevall & Pau; Juncus schischkinii Krylov & Sumnev.; Juncus triglumis var. albescens Lange; Juncus triglumis var. schischkinii (Krylov & Sumnev.) Novikov; Juncus triglumis subsp. wakhaniensis Snogerup

= Juncus triglumis =

Species of flowering plant

Juncus triglumis, called the three-flowered rush, is a species of flowering plant in the genus Juncus, native to the subarctic and subalpine Northern Hemisphere. It is typically found in calcareous tundra habitats and arcto-alpine fens. It is often found in association with Carex atrofusca and Carex bicolor in the so-called Caricion bicolori-atrofuscae alliance.

== Subtaxa ==
The following subspecies are currently accepted:

- Juncus triglumis subsp. albescens (Lange) Hultén - Kamchatka and Chukotka in Far Eastern Russia, Alaska (including the Aleutians), all of Canada except the Yukon, the Rocky Mountains of the United States, and Greenland
- Juncus triglumis subsp. triglumis - Greenland, Iceland, the Faroes, Great Britain, Europe, Asia, Japan, Sakhalin, the Kurils, Alaska (not including the Aleutians), British Columbia, the Yukon and the Northwest Territories in Canada, and the Rocky Mountains of the United States
