= Festuca edlundiae =

Scientific classification
- Kingdom: Plantae
- Clade: Tracheophytes
- Clade: Angiosperms
- Clade: Monocots
- Clade: Commelinids
- Order: Poales
- Family: Poaceae
- Subfamily: Pooideae
- Genus: Festuca
- Species: F. edlundiae

Binomial name
- Festuca edlundiae S.G.Aiken, Consaul & Lefk.

Species of flowering plant

Festuca edlundiae, commonly known as Edlund's fescue, is a native, perennial, tufted grass of the High Arctic. It occurs in Alaska, the Canadian Arctic Archipelago, northern Greenland, far eastern Arctic Russia, and Svalbard. The specific epithet honours Canadian botanist Sylvia Edlund. The species was first formally described in 1995 by Susan Aiken, Laurie Consaul, and Leonard Lefkovitch.

== Description ==
Festuca edlundiae is closely related to Festuca brachyphylla and resembles boreal fescue (Festuca hyperborea). It differs in having longer flag-leaf blades (5 mm or more) and larger spikelets. Plants form dense clumps and lack rhizomes.

== Habitat ==
F. edlundiae grows in High Arctic environments, typically on fine-grained or calcareous soils. It is well adapted to cold, short-season conditions and occurs in tundra habitats where few grasses can survive.
