= Sylvia Edlund =

Canadian botanist

- Born: August 15, 1945; Pittsburgh, Pennsylvania, U.S.
- Died: November 15, 2014 (aged 69); Nanaimo, British Columbia, Canada

Academic background
- Education: Case Western Reserve University; University of Chicago

Academic work
- Institutions: United Nations; Geological Survey of Canada
- Main interests: botanist
- Notable works: Common arctic wildflowers of the Northwest Territories

Sylvia Anita Edlund (August 15, 1945 – November 15, 2014) was a Canadian botanist. Festuca edlundiae, commonly known as Edlund's fescue, a high arctic grass, was named in her honour for her extensive contributions to Arctic field work.

== Life ==
She was born in Pittsburgh, of Swedish heritage, and grew up there and in Ontario. Edlund earned a BSc from Case Western Reserve University and a PhD in botany from the University of Chicago. Before she began field work, Edlund was often ill and was frequently confined to bed as a child. She said that she took up botany because she thought that she "shouldn't study anything I'd have to chase". She began work with a United Nations team tasked with producing an inventory of plants and animals in the far north. She worked in the Canadian Arctic for the Geological Survey of Canada (GSC) from 1974 to 1994, when she was forced to retire due to a problem with an inflamed appendix which was not diagnosed in time and wound up affecting her short-term memory. In 1994 she co-edited the exsiccata-like series of voucher slides with the title Americanarum Diatomarum exsiccata

Edlund was an expert on plant distribution patterns in the Arctic. She also published a book on Common arctic wildflowers of the Northwest Territories which she illustrated with her own watercolours. Edlund made extensive collections of plants across the Canadian Arctic. More than 5,000 of these collections are housed in the National Herbarium of Canada at the Canadian Museum of Nature. At the end of her professional career, she managed the High Arctic Global Change Observatory for the GSC. After retiring, she became a volunteer working with people with disabilities in Ottawa and on Gabriola Island in British Columbia. She earned a master's degree in Therapeutic Counselling from the Open International University for Complementary Medicines in 2003.

She died in Nanaimo from sepsis and kidney failure at the age of 69.
