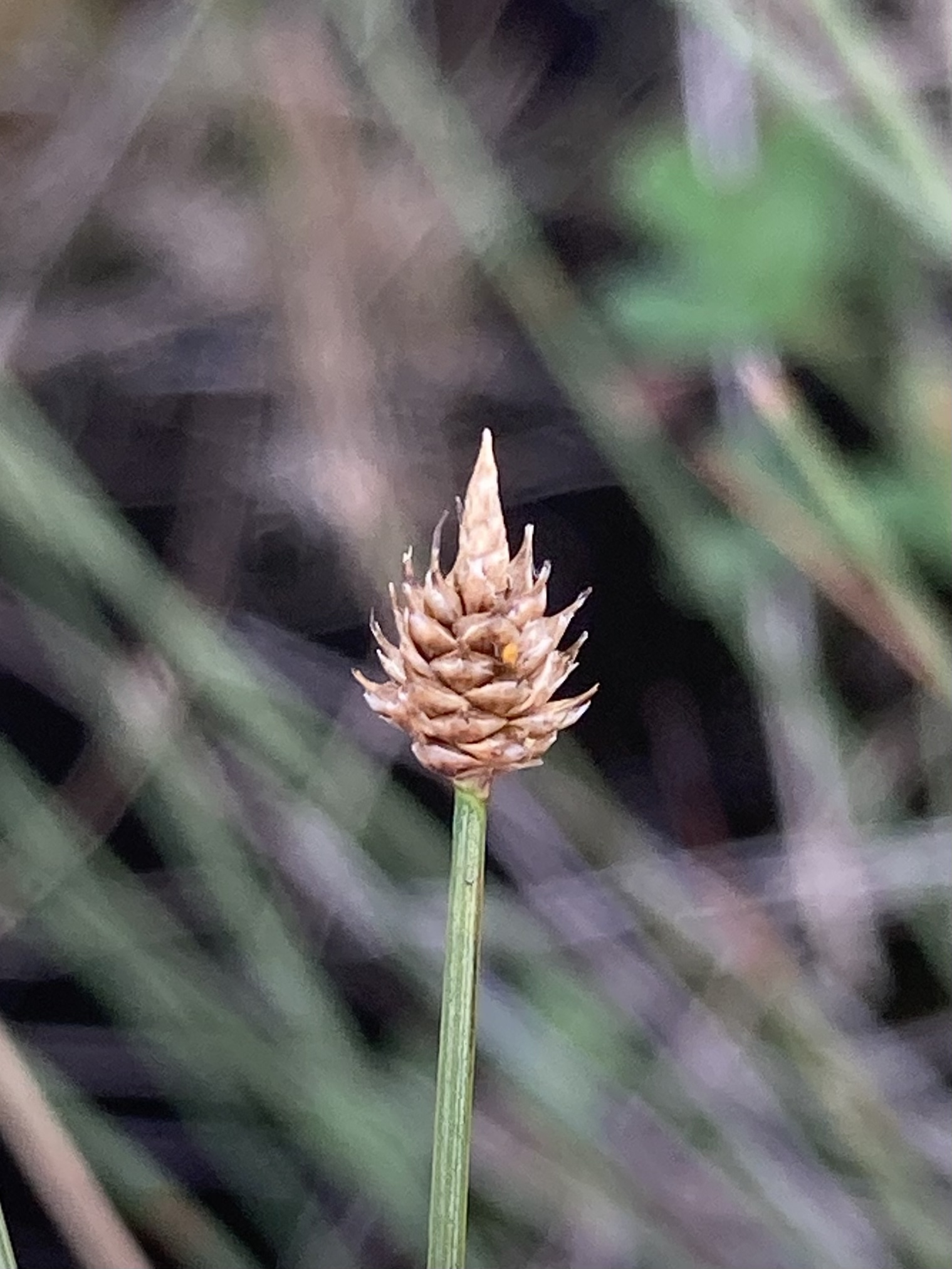

Scientific classification
- Kingdom: Plantae
- Clade: Tracheophytes
- Clade: Angiosperms
- Clade: Monocots
- Clade: Commelinids
- Order: Poales
- Family: Cyperaceae
- Genus: Carex
- Species: C. arctogena

Binomial name
- Carex arctogena Harry Sm., 1940

= Carex arctogena =

Species of grass-like plant

Carex arctogena is a member of the sedge family (Cyperaceae) which grows in high alpine areas. It is one of the few "bipolar" species; it has populations in Greenland, Scandinavia, Russia, Canada and southern South America. Plants in the far north and south appear to be genetically identical, having taken advantage of a similar niches on opposite ends of the globe.

Carex arctogena has often been confused with the closely related Carex capitata. They were classified as one species until Harry Smith distinguished the differences between them 1940. Defining morphological characteristics of this species include: toothed scales which cover the female reproductive parts of the inflorescence, a larger seed relative to the size of the female reproductive sac (perigynia) and round perigynia which quickly taper towards the apex. It produces a single spike on each stem and has long elongated leaves which are characteristic for the genus Carex.

== Description ==
C. arctogena has short rhizomes which grow new shoots and roots, allowing it to grow in a cespitose (tufted or turf-like) manner. This means that it can be found growing in dense tufts amongst its habitat.

This species produces vegetative shoots which become leaves; these are made up from a leaf sheath covering a culm. These will grow to be 1 mm wide and have parallel veins running through the sheath. Sedges' reproductive shoots are where their inflorescences grow. Specimens are typically between 10 and 30 cm tall but tend toward the smaller sizes as the sister species, C. capitata, is usually taller.

A spike will be made up from many florets. Basal florets consist of a pair of brown glumes (two sterile bracts) which subtend the perigynia. In C. arctogena the glumes are brown and significantly smaller than those of its sister species.

Within a spike there will numerous perigynia; these perigynia are membranes which enclose female flowers and fruits. Each perigynia will be on average 1.7–2.7 mm long and 1.2–1.7 mm wide, forming a bottle shape towards the open apex. In Carex this is termed a "beak" and can be seen drastically tapering in C. arctogena compared to the perigynia's otherwise reasonably rounded main body.

In Cyperaceae the perianth (sepals and petals) is often reduced or absent, which results in visible reproductive organs. In C. arctogena the perianth is absent meaning that only the style or stigma may protrude from the narrowed opening. The female flowers have two long thin stigmas which can appear red or brown. The ovary can be defined as superior (the ovary lies above the point of attachment for sepals, petals and stamens.

C. arctogena is monoecious, meaning that both pistilate (female) and staminate (male) flowers occur on the same spike. This makes the whole sedge androgynous. The female flowers (multiple spikelets) are arranged in a spherical shape around the centre of the spike, but nonetheless still point upwards no matter how marginally. Male flowers are sparsely arranged at the apex of the inflorescence, creating a conical projection at the top of the spike. Typically these characteristics can segregate C. arctogena from C. capitata as the spikelets will not be so erect and may point outwards, creating a less overall conical shape of the inflorescence.

A typical characteristic of C. arctogena are the pistilate scales on the perigynium. These cover almost the whole perigynia body but stop before it tapers at the apex. These can be seen under a microscope and appear white, with toothed margins. In C. capitata, the pistilate scales will be much shorter than the perigynia and will not appear toothed.

The fruit produced by C. arctogena is classed as an achene, a dry seed which has a thin wall. These characteristics make the seed light and enable it to be dispersed by wind. The presence of two stigmas equates to the fruit produced having two sides and being classified as lenticular. In this species the achene is larger relative to the perigynia, meaning that it will almost completely fill this area. Whereas in C. capitata, the achene is considerably smaller than the area of the perigynium.

== Etymology ==
The generic name, Carex, is the Latin word for sedge. It comes from the Greek word kairo which means "to cut", this refers to the long narrow leaves in which some species have sharp edges. The specific name arctogena is derived from the species' Arctic distribution.

== Habitat and ecology ==
This species has a bipolar distribution which means it can be found in both the Northern and Southern Hemispheres. The habitats are usually alpine areas at high altitude. Within its northern locality in Fremont County samples have been found on alpine summits at 2,590–370 metres (8,500–1,200 ft). Whereas, within the Arctic climate of Greenland specimens have been found at maximum altitudes of 250 metres (820 ft).

Primarily this species prefers poor, lime soils and has been known to grow in serpentine soils; these contain higher than average amounts of nickel, iron, cobalt and chromium. High alpine areas have large amounts of surface runoff from snowfields, meaning that the soil quality may be poor. Many herbarium specimens have been found on heathlands and grasslands located on hilltops. This creates a niche habitat for species which prefer little soil nutrients and harsh winds. Due to it being an alpine plant, it is rarely found below the tree line, meaning it grows only in forested areas.

The habitat of C. arctogena and C. capitata rarely overlap. C. arctogena grows at higher elevations and prefers moist calcareous soils, not overshadowed by dense forest cover.

In the Southern Hemisphere C. arctogena occupies the same ecological niche but its distribution is smaller because there are fewer optimal alpine areas.

== Distribution ==
Carex arctogena has a bipolar distribution across Arctic regions in the Northern Hemisphere and temperate regions in the Southern Hemisphere. This means that it can be found at high latitudes north of 55 ˚N and south of 52 ˚S.

Within this range there are populations in the Northern Hemisphere that include:

- Scandinavia: Norway, Sweden, Finland
- Greenland
- Canada: Labrador, Newfoundland, Manitoba, Nunavut, Ontario, Quebec, Saskatchewan
- Russia: Magadan
- United States: California, Colorado, Wyoming, New Hampshire, Vermont

In the Southern Hemisphere:

- South America: northwest and southern Argentina, Chile

A study revealed haplotypes in C. arctogena which also occur in C. capitata, which is only present in the Northern Hemisphere. From this we can assume that C. arcotgena was originally distributed in the Northern Hemisphere and more recently established populations in the south.

== Taxonomy and systematics ==
In 1940 Harry Smith was the first to propose that C. capitata was actually two species. He described differences in populations that he observed in Sweden, noticing small brown inflorescences compared to that of the larger green inflorescences of C. capitata. He created a set of characteristics that could be used to distinguish them. Smith gathered and analysed samples from museums, and was able to separate them into C. arctogena (a new species) or C. capitata as described by Carl Linnaeus.

Today the name Carex arctogena Harry Sm. is the accepted name for this species. Although during the last century many new taxonomic classifications were proposed. In 1944 Hiitonen proposed that C. arctogena should be classified as Carex capitata subsp. arctogena. This was also suggested by Tyge W. Böcher in 1952 but that has not been accepted by taxonomists. In 1949 it was classified by Raymond as: Carex capitata f. arctogena, and in 1958 Eric Hultén proposed C. arctogena be classified as a variety of C. capitata. None of these were widely accepted and today we have genetic evidence that these are two distinct species. Genetic analyses has verified that C. arctogena and C. capitata share a common origin. C. arctogena likely diverged recently as there little genetic variation within it, not even between specimens from different hemispheres.

Type specimens are located at herbariums in northern Europe, New Hampshire, Argentina and Labrador.

== Bipolar distribution ==
Only 30 plant species are known to have a bipolar distribution, a large proportion of which belong to the family Cyperaceae. It has been hypothesised that C. arctogena has been dispersed either by anthropomorphic introduction or by migratory birds. The seeds within this species have been found to contain silica deposits in the pericarp, this can help to make the seeds tougher.
