= Festuca groenlandica =

Scientific classification
- Kingdom: Plantae
- Clade: Tracheophytes
- Clade: Angiosperms
- Clade: Monocots
- Clade: Commelinids
- Order: Poales
- Family: Poaceae
- Subfamily: Pooideae
- Genus: Festuca
- Species: F. groenlandica

Binomial name
- Festuca groenlandica (Schol.) Fred.

Species of grass

Festuca groenlandica, commonly known as the Greenland fescue, is a species of grass in the Festuca genus and Poaceae family. It is endemic to Greenland. The Flora of North America accepts this species. Other sources regard it as a synonym of Festuca brachyphylla.

In 1977 it was considered a subspecies to F. brachyphylla by Signe Frederiksen, who then later in 1983 promoted it to its own species, F. groenlandica.
