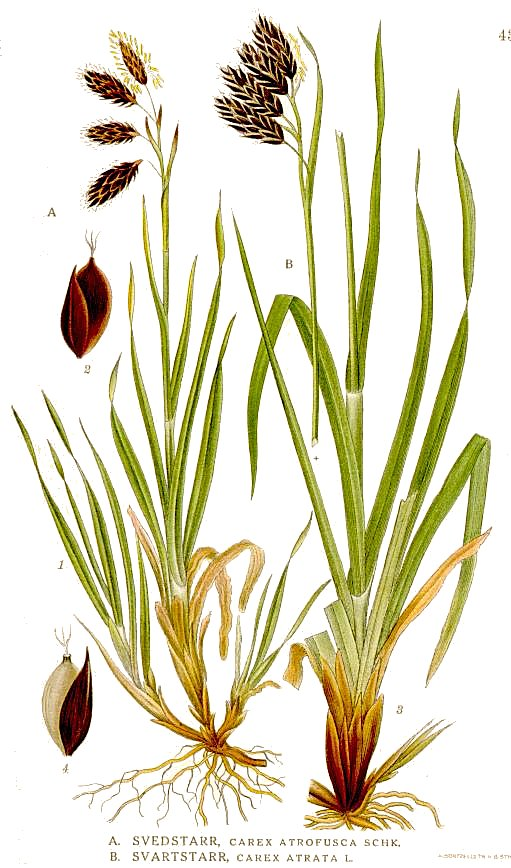
- Botanical illustration, with Carex atrofusca on the left and Carex atrata on the right.

Scientific classification
- Kingdom: Plantae
- Clade: Tracheophytes
- Clade: Angiosperms
- Clade: Monocots
- Clade: Commelinids
- Order: Poales
- Family: Cyperaceae
- Genus: Carex
- Species: C. atrata

Binomial name
- Carex atrata L.

Synonyms
- Loxanisa atrata (L.) Raf.; Trasus atratus (L.) Gray

= Carex atrata =

Species of flowering plant

Carex atrata, called black alpine sedge, is a widespread species of flowering plant in the genus Carex, native to Greenland, Iceland, and most of Europe, plus scattered locations across temperate Asia, including Anatolia, Siberia and the Himalaya, as far as Taiwan and Japan. Its chromosome number is 2n=52, with some variants reported, e.g. n2=54 for Greenland material.

== Subspecies ==
The following subspecies are currently accepted:

- Carex atrata subsp. atrata
- Carex atrata subsp. longistolonifera (Kük.) S.Yun Liang
- Carex atrata subsp. pullata (Boott) Kük.
