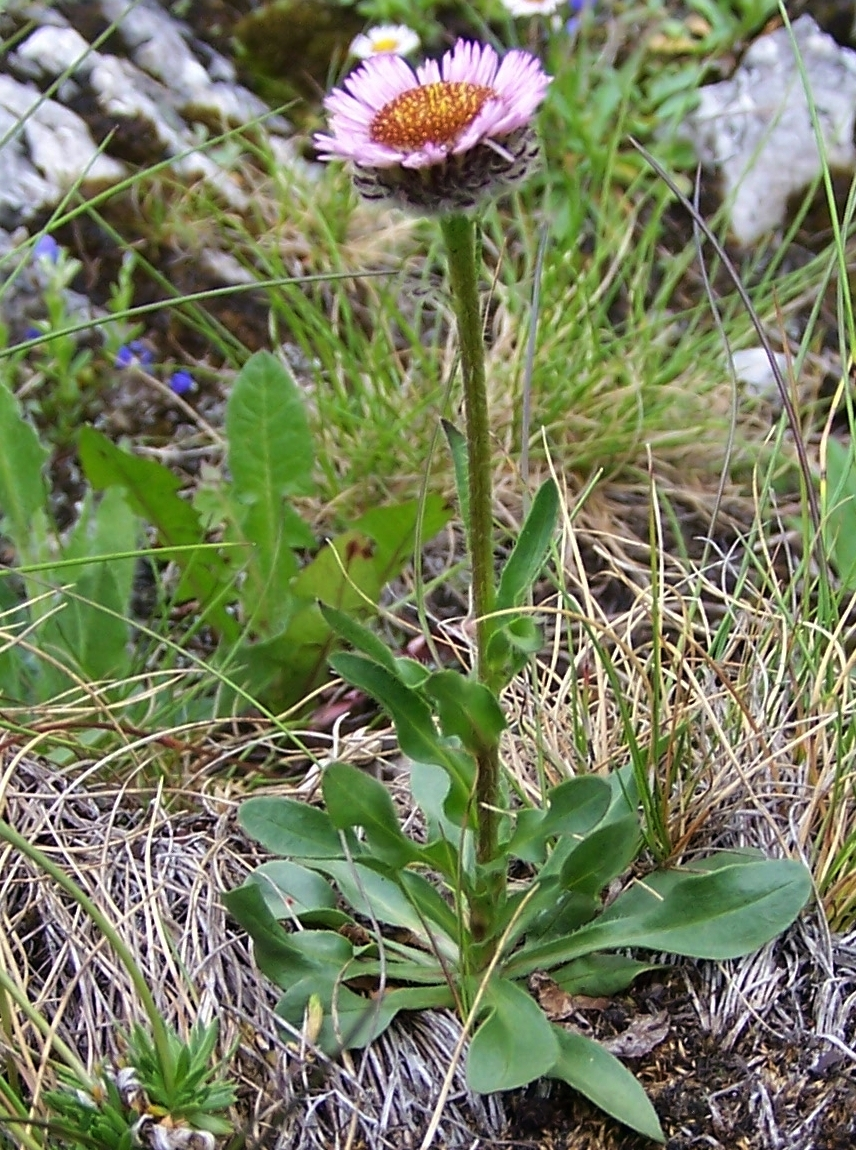
- Tatra Mountains in Poland

Scientific classification
- Kingdom: Plantae
- Clade: Embryophytes
- Clade: Tracheophytes
- Clade: Angiosperms
- Clade: Eudicots
- Clade: Asterids
- Order: Asterales
- Family: Asteraceae
- Genus: Erigeron
- Species: E. uniflorus

Binomial name
- Erigeron uniflorus L.

Synonyms
- Erigeron uniflorum L.; Erigeron alpinus var. uniflorus Ledeb.; Erigeron polymorphus Scop.; Heterochaeta erigeroides DC.

= Erigeron uniflorus =

Species of flowering plant in the daisy family

Erigeron uniflorus is a Eurasian and North American species of flowering plant in the family Asteraceae known by the common name one-flower fleabane. It is widespread in Arctic and alpine regions in Eurasia and North America (northern Canada, Alaska, Greenland).
