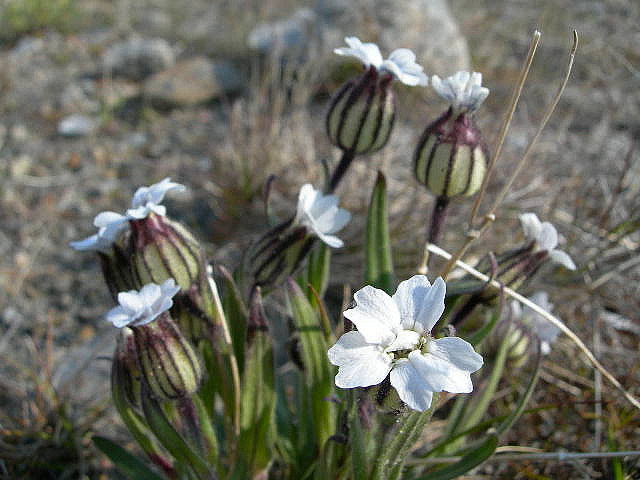

Scientific classification
- Kingdom: Plantae
- Clade: Tracheophytes
- Clade: Angiosperms
- Clade: Eudicots
- Order: Caryophyllales
- Family: Caryophyllaceae
- Genus: Silene
- Species: S. involucrata

Binomial name
- Silene involucrata (Cham. & Schltdl.) Bocquet

= Silene involucrata =

Species of flowering plant

Silene involucrata is a species of flowering plant belonging to the family Caryophyllaceae.

It is native to Subarctic.

Synonym:

- Silene furcata Raf.
