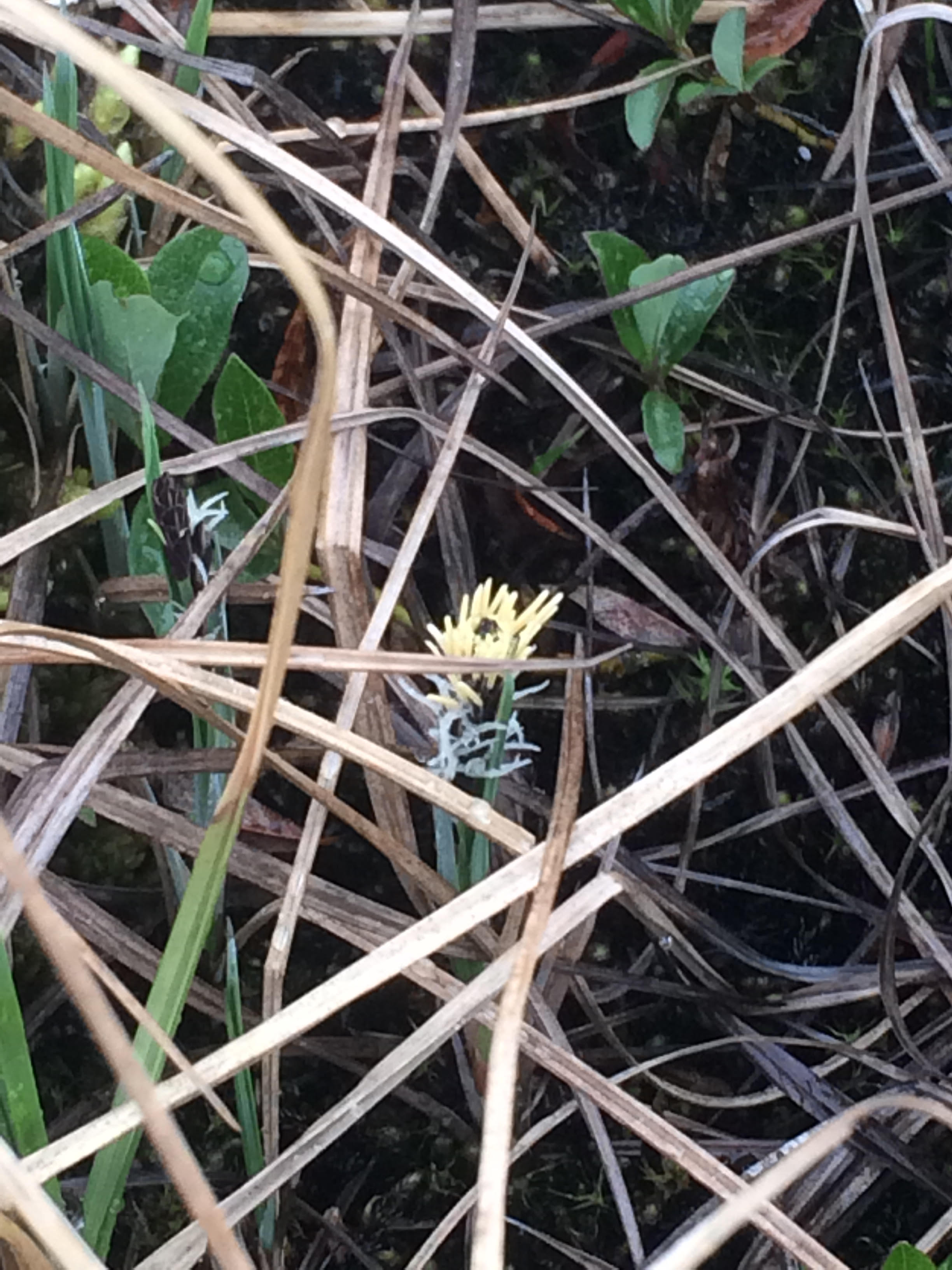
- The sedge Carex rariflora. Taken in Atqasuk, Alaska.

Conservation status
- Least Concern (IUCN 3.1)

Scientific classification
- Kingdom: Plantae
- Clade: Tracheophytes
- Clade: Angiosperms
- Clade: Monocots
- Clade: Commelinids
- Order: Poales
- Family: Cyperaceae
- Genus: Carex
- Species: C. rariflora

Binomial name
- Carex rariflora (Wahlenb.) Sm.

= Carex rariflora =

Species of grass-like plant

Carex rariflora, the looseflower alpine sedge, is a species of plant in the sedge family. It is found in the United States in Alaska and Maine, and in Canada in New Brunswick and Nova Scotia. In these regions, it is ranked as an obligate hydrophyte in establishing wetland areas. It prefers wet environments such as open bogs, meadows, seepage slopes, and low-elevation heath tundra. This perennial grass, which can be up to 3 feet tall, has fibrous roots, and holds all perennial organs underground. The leaves are alternate, long, narrow, and simple, with parallel veins. They grow in dense clusters, and the dead leaves are found at the base of the plant. The plant blooms and fruits in the summer. All flowers are monoecious and unisexual, producing a spike inflorescence. All inflorescences are subtended by shorter, proximal bracts.
