= Gentianella aurea =

Scientific classification
- Kingdom: Plantae
- Clade: Tracheophytes
- Clade: Angiosperms
- Clade: Eudicots
- Clade: Asterids
- Order: Gentianales
- Family: Gentianaceae
- Genus: Gentianella
- Species: G. aurea

Binomial name
- Gentianella aurea (L.) Harry Sm.

Species of flowering plant

Gentianella aurea is a species of flowering plant belonging to the family Gentianaceae.

Its native range is Greenland, Northern and Northeastern Europe, Mongolia.

Synonym:

- Gentiana aurea
