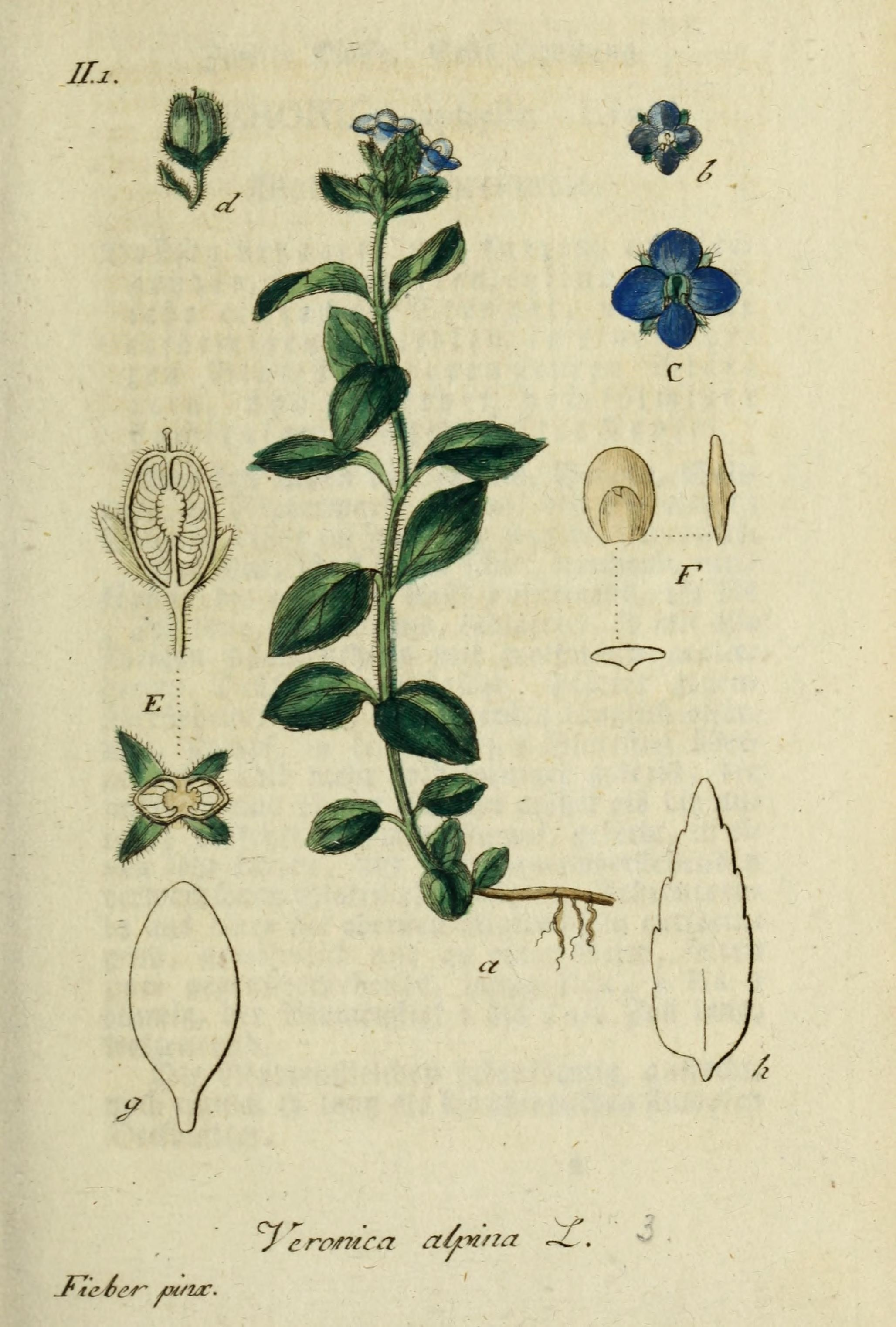
- Botanical illustration
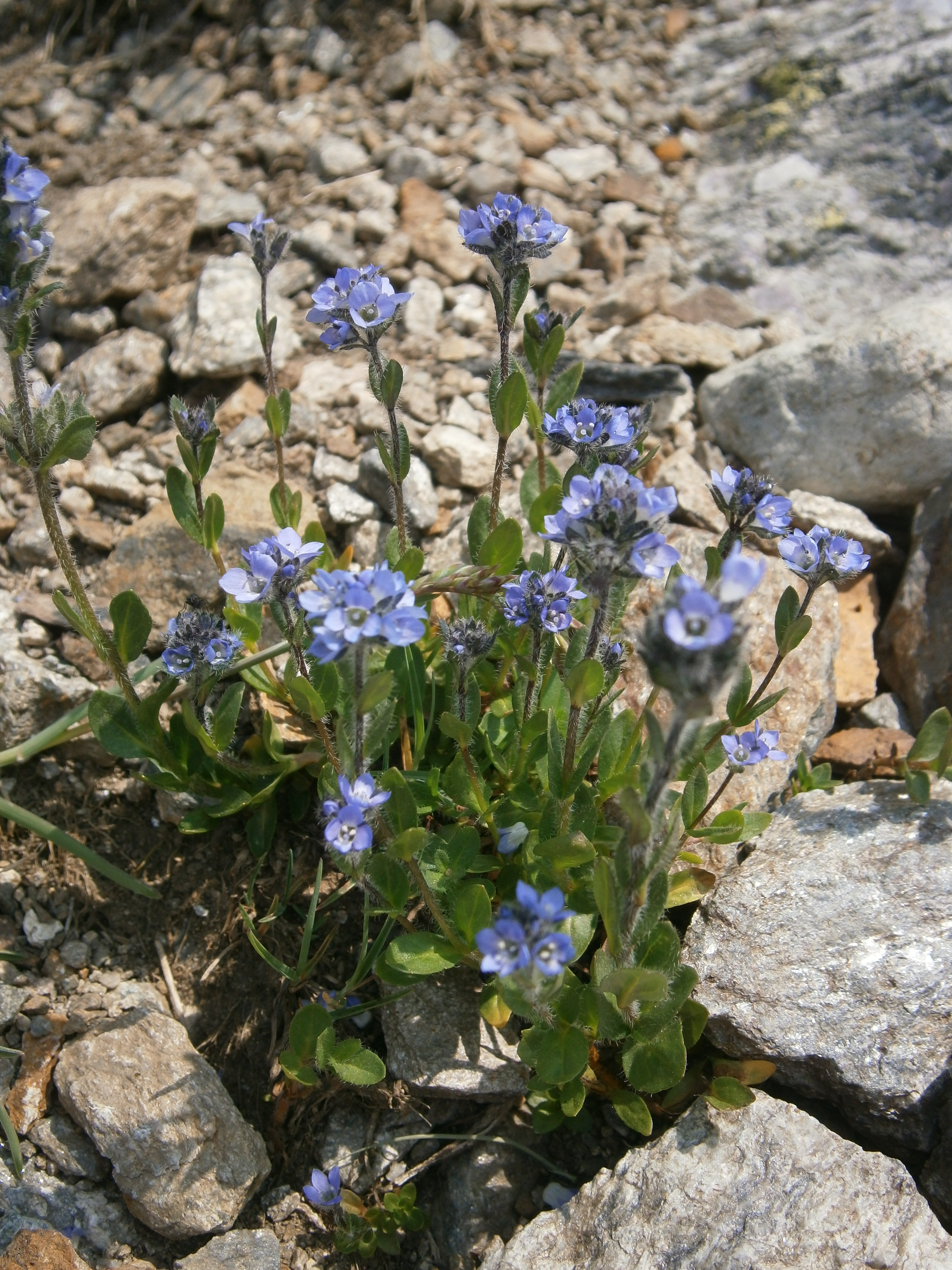
- In bloom

Scientific classification
- Kingdom: Plantae
- Clade: Embryophytes
- Clade: Tracheophytes
- Clade: Spermatophytes
- Clade: Angiosperms
- Clade: Eudicots
- Clade: Asterids
- Order: Lamiales
- Family: Plantaginaceae
- Genus: Veronica
- Species: V. alpina

Binomial name
- Veronica alpina L.

Synonyms
- List: Cardia alpina (L.) Dulac; Veronica alpina f. albiflora Rosenv.; Veronica alpina var. australis Wahlenb.; Veronica alpina subsp. australis (Wahlenb.) Á.Löve & D.Löve; Veronica alpina subsp. lasiocarpa (Pennell) Elenevsky; Veronica alpina subsp. minuscularia (Pau) Rivas Mart. & Molero Mesa; Veronica carnea Vitman; Veronica clarkeana Schult. & Schult.f.; Veronica gebhardiana Vest ex Schult.; Veronica grandifolia Vest ex Schult.; Veronica imbricata Woerl.; Veronica integrifolia Schrank; Veronica lasiocarpa Pennell; Veronica minuscularia Pau; Veronica pumila All.; Veronica pygmaea Schrank; Veronica rotundifolia Schrank; Veronicastrum alpinum (L.) Fourr.

= Veronica alpina =

Species of flowering plant

Veronica alpina, the alpine speedwell or alpine veronica, is a species of flowering plant in the genus Veronica, native to Canada, Greenland, Iceland, the Faroes, Svalbard, most of Europe, parts of Siberia, northern Pakistan, the western Himalayas, and Tibet. It is the namesake of the Veronica alpina species complex, which also includes V. bellidioides, V. copelandii, V. cusickii, V. nipponica, V. nutans, V. stelleri and V. wormskjoldii.
