= Carex boecheriana =

Scientific classification
- Kingdom: Plantae
- Clade: Tracheophytes
- Clade: Angiosperms
- Clade: Monocots
- Clade: Commelinids
- Order: Poales
- Family: Cyperaceae
- Genus: Carex
- Species: C. boecheriana

Binomial name
- Carex boecheriana Á.Löve, D.Löve & Raymond

Synonyms
- Carex capillaris subsp. robustior (Lange) Drejer ex Böcher; Carex capillaris var. robustior Lange

Species of grass-like plant

Carex boecheriana, Böcher's sedge, is a species of sedge in the family Cyperaceae, native to Greenland. It grows in chalky, salty soils on both sides of the island. It is a fairly tall sedge, growing to a height of 20–40 cm (8–20 in). It is a host of the smut fungus Anthracoidea capillaris.

== Taxonomy ==
Carex boecheriana was formally described in 1957 based on specimens from West Greenland. Specimens of C. boecheriana were confused with two subspecies of C. capillaris, C. c. robustior and C. c. major, before the description of the first species. The sedge is commonly known as Böcher's sedge in English, Bøchers Star in Danish, and Ivigaasaq in Greenlandic.

== Description ==
Carex boecheriana is a fairly tall sedge, growing to a height of 20–40 cm (8–20 in). It grows to 12–15 cm (5–6 in) tall before growing fruit, growing further to their full height after the fruit have dropped. It has yellow-green leaves 1–2 mm (0.04–0.08 in) wide and 5–10 cm (2–4 in) long. These leaves are folded, have somewhat crenulate margins, and grow from the base of the plant. The stalks grow upright and have a diameter of 1–1.5 mm (0.04–0.06 in), sprouting an inflorescence with a length of 10–25 cm (4–10 in). Female inflorescences sprout eight to eighteen flowers, while the bisexual terminal inflorescence is male at its foot. The female inflorescences number two in four in quantity and grow at some height above the leaves, drooping over them. They have chestnut-colored perigynia.

The sedge is a host plant for the smut fungus Anthracoidea capillaris.

== Distribution ==
Carex boecheriana is endemic to Greenland, where it is found in chalky, salty soils on both sides of the island. In the east, it occurs from Scoresby Sound north to V. Clausen Fjord, while in the west, it occurs from Eqalugaarsuit Iluat south to the fjord of Ameralla near Nipaatsoq. It is not a common plant.
