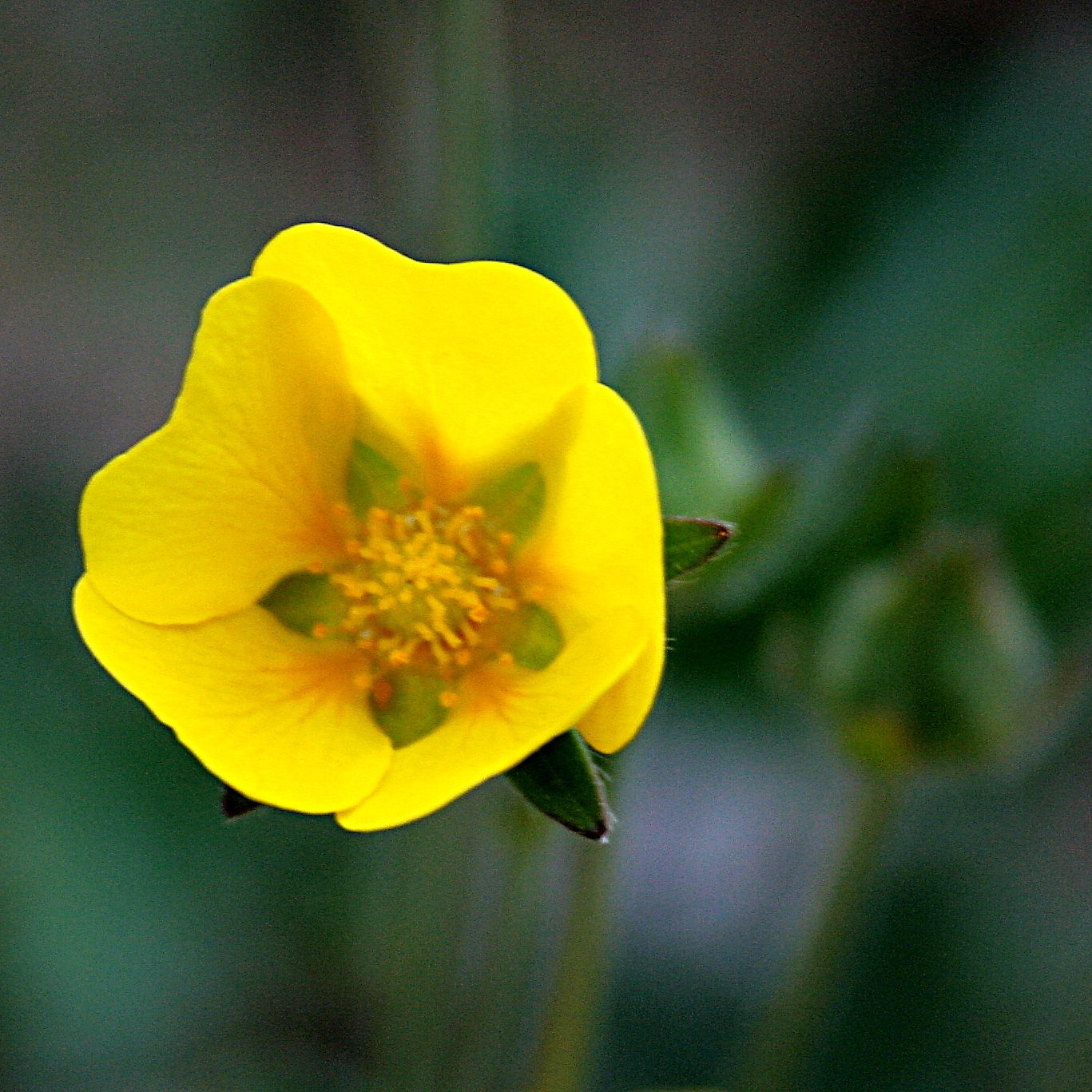
- Flower
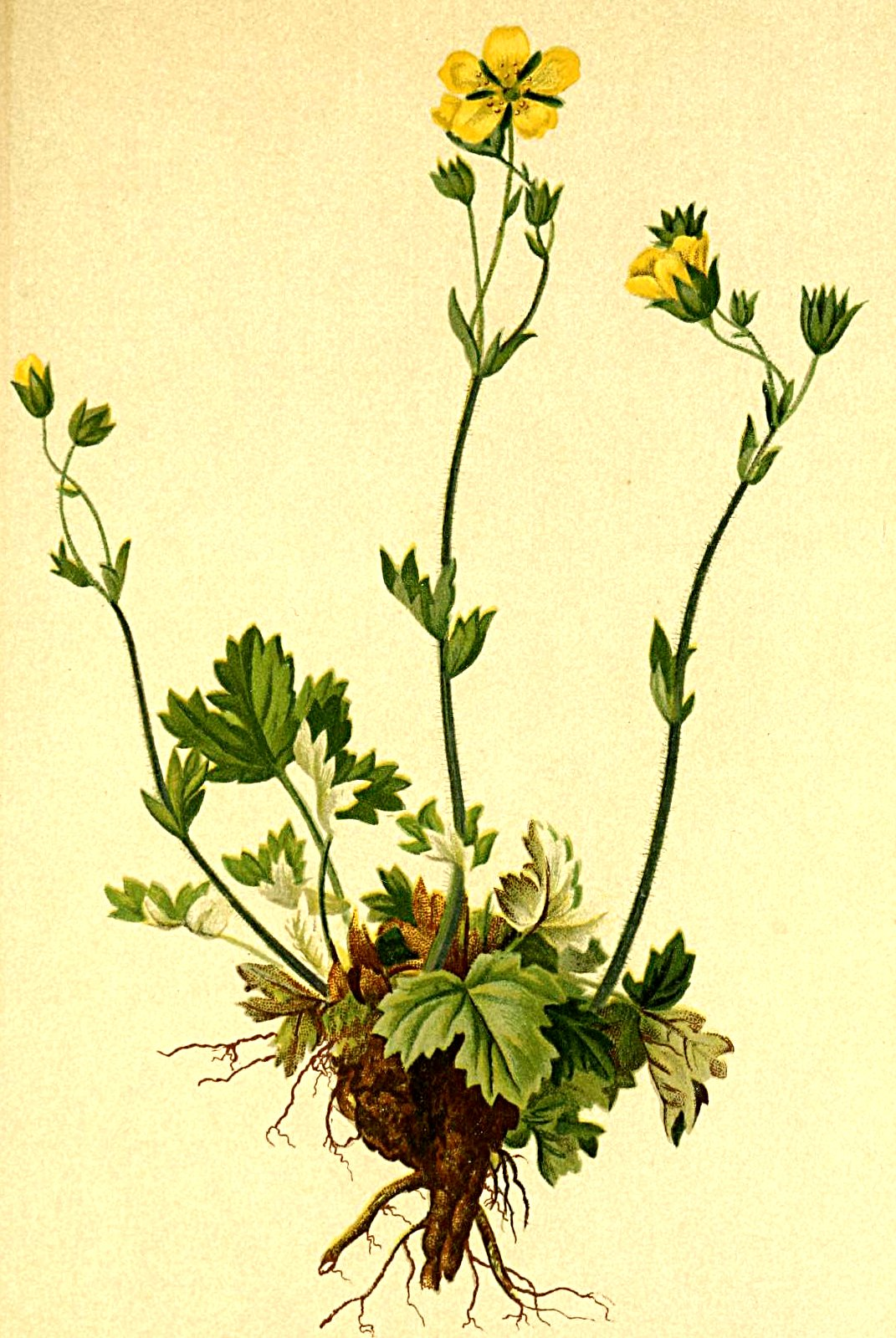
- (from Atlas der Alpenflora)

Scientific classification
- Kingdom: Plantae
- Clade: Embryophytes
- Clade: Tracheophytes
- Clade: Angiosperms
- Clade: Eudicots
- Clade: Rosids
- Order: Rosales
- Family: Rosaceae
- Genus: Potentilla
- Species: P. nivea

Binomial name
- Potentilla nivea L.

Synonyms
- List: Fragaria nivea (L.) Crantz; Potentilla concinna var. dissecta (S.Watson) B.Boivin; Potentilla dryophylla Pall. ex Ledeb.; Potentilla fragariifolia Less. ex Ledeb.; Potentilla jamesoniana Grev.; Potentilla jezoensis Soják; Potentilla macrantha Ledeb.; Potentilla matsuokana Makino; Potentilla nivea var. alpina Turcz.; Potentilla nivea var. arctica Cham. & Schltdl.; Potentilla nivea subsp. chionodes Hiitonen; Potentilla nivea var. dissecta S.Watson; Potentilla nivea subsp. fallax A.E.Porsild; Potentilla nivea var. incisa Turcz.; Potentilla nivea var. insularis Peschkova; Potentilla nivea var. major Turcz.; Potentilla nivea var. niveiformis Jurtzev; Potentilla nivea var. pentaphylla Turcz.; Potentilla nivea var. petiolulata Popov; Potentilla nivea var. quinquefolia Rydb.; Potentilla nivea var. tomentosa Nilsson-Ehle ex Hultén; Potentilla nivea f. unifoliolosa (Hultén) B.Boivin; Potentilla quinquefolia (Rydb.) Rydb.; Potentilla saximontana var. dissecta (S.Watson) Soják; Potentilla uniflora subsp. arctica (Cham. & Schltdl.) Hiitonen; Potentilla villosa var. unifoliolosa Hultén

= Potentilla nivea =

Species of flowering plant

Potentilla nivea, called the snow cinquefoil, snowy cinquefoil, and villous cinquefoil, is a species of flowering plant in the genus Potentilla, native to Subarctic Asia, North America, Greenland, and Europe, and the Subalpine Rockies and Alps. It comes in many ploidy levels; 2x, 3x, 4x, 5x, 6x, 7x, 8x and 10x.

It fwas first described by Carl Linnaeus in 1753, who described it as living in the alps (habitat in alpibus).
