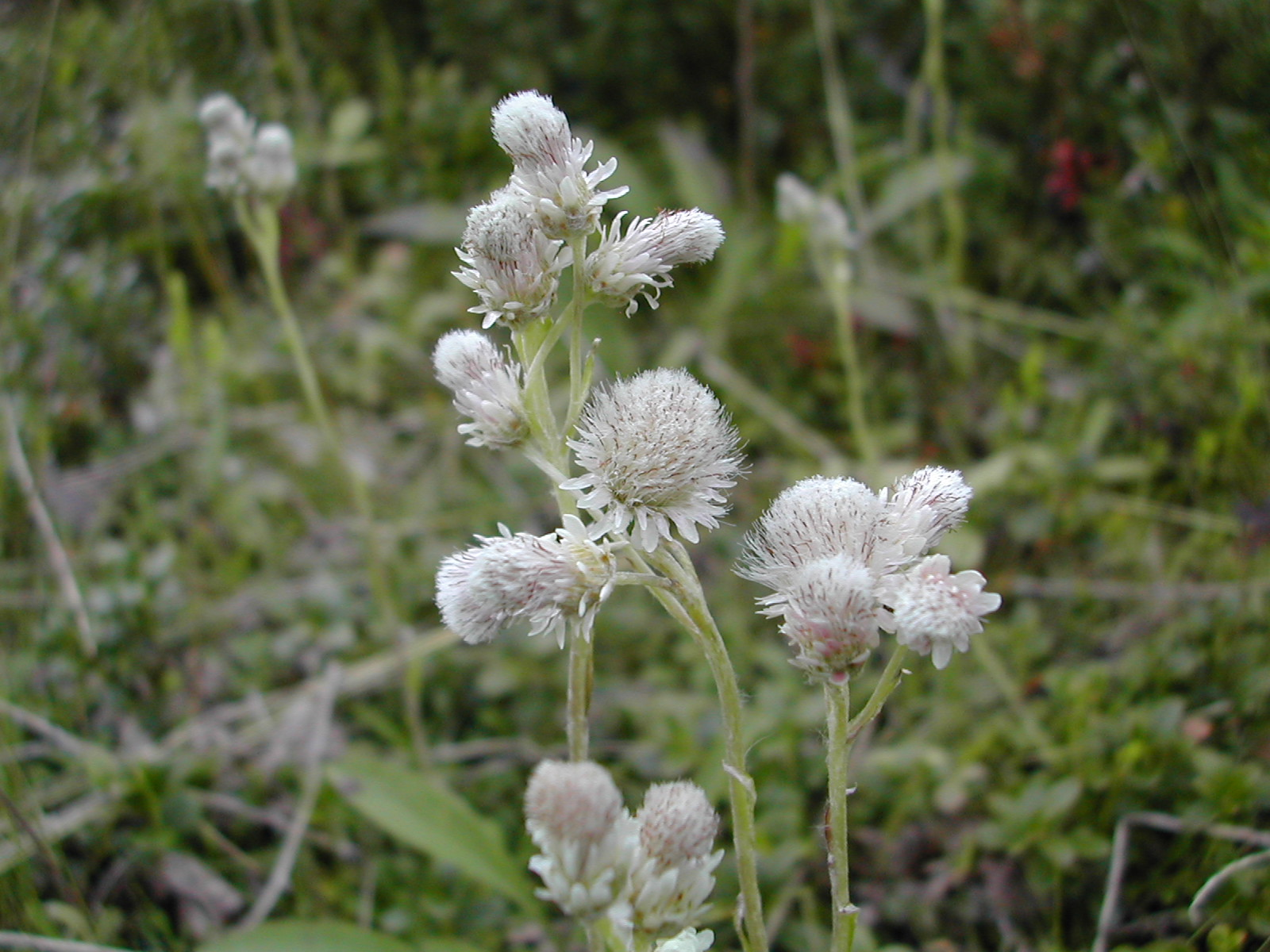

Conservation status
- Secure (NatureServe)

Scientific classification
- Kingdom: Plantae
- Clade: Tracheophytes
- Clade: Angiosperms
- Clade: Eudicots
- Clade: Asterids
- Order: Asterales
- Family: Asteraceae
- Genus: Antennaria
- Species: A. alpina

Binomial name
- Antennaria alpina (L.) Gaertn.

Synonyms
- Gnaphalium alpinum

= Antennaria alpina =

Plant species in the sunflower family

Antennaria alpina (alpine pussytoes, alpine catsfoot, or alpine everlasting) is a European and North American species of plant in the family Asteraceae. Antennaria alpina is native to mountainous and subarctic regions of Scandinavia, Greenland, Alaska, and the Canadian Arctic, extending south at high altitudes in mountains in the Rocky Mountains south to Montana and Wyoming.

== Description ==
Antennaria alpina is a perennial, herbaceous plant growing 3 to 18 centimeters tall. The plant spreads by means of stolons that reach between 1 and 7 cm in length. It is a cushion plant, a compact, low-growing, mat-forming plant, with a dense taproot that forms annual growth rings.

The basal leaves, those attached to the base of the plant, have one prominent vein and are spatulate to oblanceolate in shape, with a length of 6 to 25 millimeters and a width of 2 to 7 mm. The surface of the leaves are green and nearly hairless to gray in color with many hairs, but the undersides are tomentose, white due to a thick covering of woolly hairs. The leaves attached to the stems are even smaller, and narrow like a blade of grass, just 5 to 20 mm long.

Each stem is topped with two to seven flowering heads. They have somewhat black bracts. Both the plants in North America and Scandinavia are mostly gynoecious, having almost all seed producing flowers and rarely producing flowers with pollen. It is an apomict, a species that will produce seeds asexually that are genetically identical to the parent. The involucre, the base under a flowering head, is 5–6.5 mm and 4–10 mm for a seed producing flower. They bloom in mid to late summer.

== Taxonomy ==
In 1753 Carl Linnaeus described a species he named Gnaphalium alpinum. This was moved to Antennaria by Joseph Gaertner, a new genus he created in 1791, to give the species its accepted name. It is further classified in the large family Asteraceae. According to Plants of the World Online, Antennaria alpina has 55 synonyms.

Table of Synonyms
Name	Year	Rank	Notes
Antennaria alpina var. cana Fernald & Wiegand	1911	variety	= het.
Antennaria alpina subsp. canescens (Lange) Chmiel.	1998	subspecies	= het.
Antennaria alpina var. canescens Lange	1869	variety	= het.
Antennaria alpina var. compacta (Malte) S.L.Welsh	1968	variety	= het.
Antennaria alpina var. glabrata J.Vahl	1869	variety	= het.
Antennaria alpina var. intermedia Rosenv.	1891	variety	= het.
Antennaria alpina f. latifolia Ekman	1927	form	= het.
Antennaria alpina var. ramosissima Lange	1887	variety	= het.
Antennaria alpina var. stolonifera (A.E.Porsild) S.L.Welsh	1968	variety	= het.
Antennaria alpina var. typica Fernald	1924	variety	= het., not validly publ.
Antennaria alpina var. ungavensis Fernald	1916	variety	= het.
Antennaria arenicola Malte	1934	species	= het.
Antennaria atriceps Fernald ex Raup	1934	species	= het.
Antennaria bayardii Fernald	1933	species	= het.
Antennaria borealis Greene	1899	species	= het.
Antennaria brunnescens Fernald	1933	species	= het.
Antennaria cana Fernald	1916	species	= het.
Antennaria canescens f. fastigiata Böcher	1963	form	= het.
Antennaria canescens var. pseudoporsildii Böcher	1963	variety	= het.
Antennaria columnaris Fernald	1933	species	= het.
Antennaria compacta Malte	1934	species	= het.
Antennaria confusa Fernald	1933	species	= het.
Antennaria crymophila A.E.Porsild	1943	species	= het.
Antennaria foggii Fernald	1933	species	= het.
Antennaria friesiana subsp. compacta (Malte) Hultén	1968	subspecies	= het.
Antennaria glabrata Greene	1898	species	= het.
Antennaria glabrata f. ramosa A.E.Porsild	1926	form	= het.
Antennaria intermedia (Rosenv.) Porsild	1914	species	= het.
Antennaria labradorica Nutt.	1841	species	= het.
Antennaria lapponica Selander	1950	species	= het.
Antennaria longii Fernald	1927	species	= het.
Antennaria media subsp. compacta (Malte) Chmiel.	1997	subspecies	= het.
Antennaria pallida E.E.Nelson	1901	species	= het.
Antennaria pedunculata A.E.Porsild	1950	species	= het.
Antennaria porsildii f. roseola Ekman	1927	form	= het.
Antennaria stolonifera A.E.Porsild	1950	species	= het.
Antennaria ungavensis Malte	1934	species	= het.
Antennaria vexillifera Fernald	1924	species	= het.
Antennaria wiegandii Fernald	1927	species	= het.
Chamaezelum alpinum Link	1829	species	= het.
Gnaphalium alpinum L.	1753	species	≡ hom.
Gnaphalium alpinum var. elatius Gaudin	1829	variety	= het.
Gnaphalium dioicum var. alpicola Hartm.	1820	variety	= het.
Gnaphalium monanthon Willd. ex DC.	1838	species	= het.
Gnaphalium uniflorum Pall. ex DC.	1838	species	= het., not validly publ.
Silene venosa proles maritima (With.) Samp.	1911	proles	= het.
Silene venosa subsp. alpina (Lam.) Simonk.	1877	subspecies	= het.
Silene venosa var. maritima (With.) Menezes	1914	variety	= het.
Silene vulgaris subsp. alpina (Lam.) Nyman	1878	subspecies	= het.
Silene vulgaris subsp. cratericola Franco	1971	subspecies	= het.
Silene vulgaris subsp. maritima (With.) Á.Löve & D.Löve	1961	subspecies	= het.
Silene vulgaris subsp. thorei (Dufour) Chater & Walters	1964	subspecies	= het.
Silene willdenowii Sweet ex O.Schwarz	1949	species	= het.
Viscago maritima With.	1796	species	= het.
Wahlbergella uniflora (Roth) Fr.	1843	species	= het.
Notes: ≡ homotypic synonym; = heterotypic synonym

=== Names ===
Antennaria alpina is known by the common names alpine pussytoes, alpine catsfoot, or alpine everlasting.

== Range and habitat ==
Alpine pussytoes are limited to alpine and boreal habitats. In Europe it is native to Norway, Sweden, Finland, and northern parts of European Russia. It grows in the mountains of Sweden and Norway in the south and towards the North Sea coast further to the north. In Asia it grows in the botanical area of the Magadan Oblast which also includes the Chukotka Autonomous Okrug at the far eastern tip of Russia.

In North America it is found in Alaska and the three northern territories of Canada. Further south it grows in both Alberta and British Columbia in the west and parts of Ontario, Québec, Labrador, and Newfoundland in the east. In the contiguous US it only grows in Montana and Wyoming. The Natural Resources Conservation Service database only records it in six scattered counties in Montana. On Greenland it is a common plant found as far north at 75°23' N in the west and to 74°50' N in the east. It grows at elevations between 100 and 2400 meters.

It grows in dry to moist tundra and alpine tundra.
