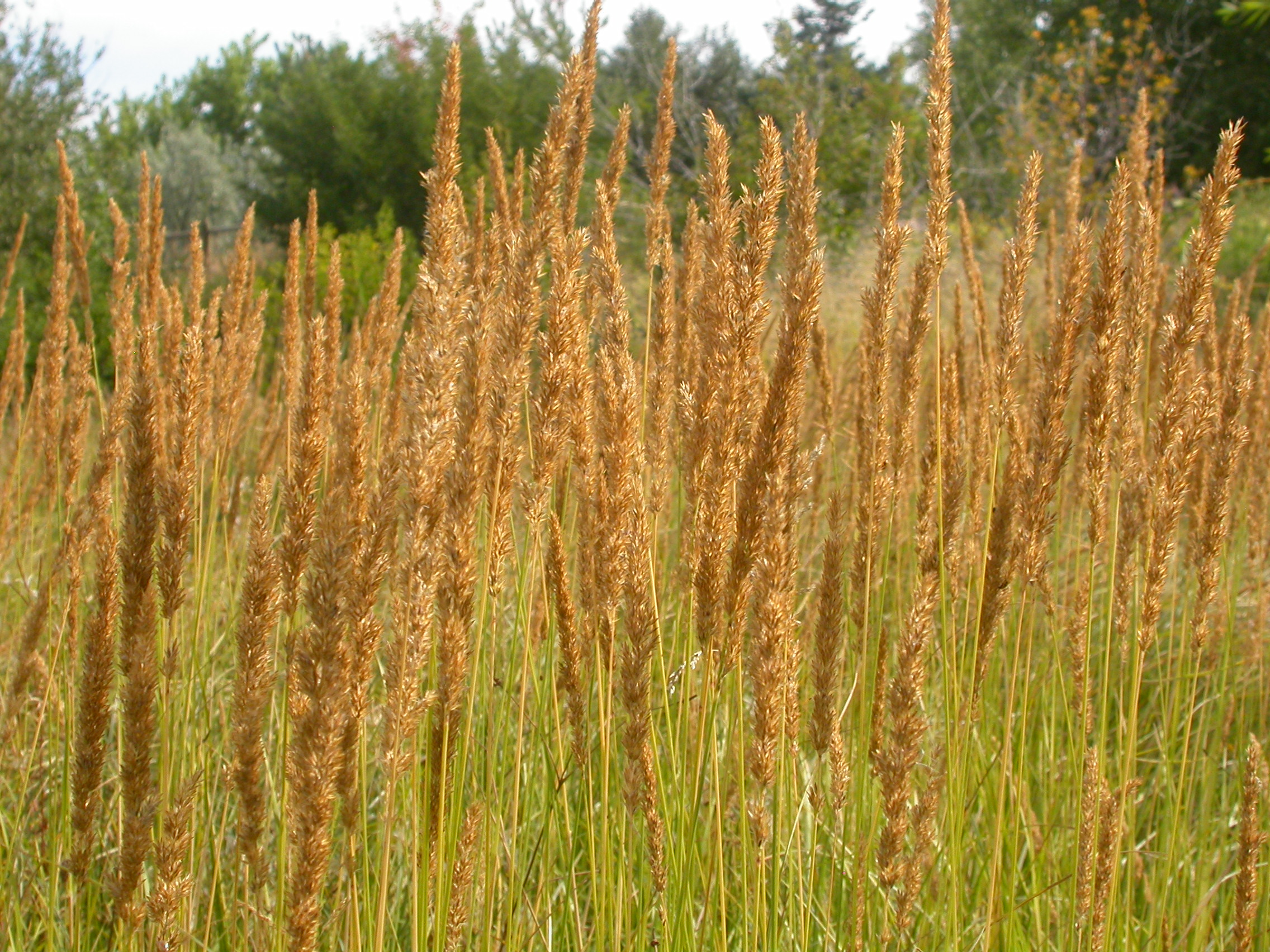

Scientific classification
- Kingdom: Plantae
- Clade: Tracheophytes
- Clade: Angiosperms
- Clade: Monocots
- Clade: Commelinids
- Order: Poales
- Family: Poaceae
- Subfamily: Pooideae
- Genus: Calamagrostis
- Species: C. stricta

Binomial name
- Calamagrostis stricta (Timm.) Koeler

Synonyms
- Calamagrostis neglecta

= Calamagrostis stricta =

Species of flowering plant

Calamagrostis stricta, known as slim-stem small reed grass or narrow small-reed, is a species of bunchgrass in the family Poaceae of the Holarctic Kingdom.

== Description ==
=== General description ===
The species is perennial and caespitose with elongated rhizomes and 30–100 centimetres (12–39 in) long culms which are also erect. The leaf-sheaths are keelless and have a glabrous surface. It leaf-blades are 30–60 centimetres (12–24 in) by 1.5–5 millimetres (0.059–0.197 in) and are flat and stiff. The leaf-blade also have a ribbed and pubescent surface with scaberulous margins the apex of which is filiformed. The panicle is inflorescenced and lanceolate with the diameter being 7–20 centimetres (2.8–7.9 in) by 1–3 centimetres (0.39–1.18 in). The main branches of the panicle are appressed and are 3–6 centimetres (1.2–2.4 in) long while the other branches are terete and scabrous.

=== Spikelets and lemma ===
Its spikelets are solitary, lanceolate, and are 3–4 millimetres (0.12–0.16 in) long. They have pedicelled fertile spikelets which are 0.5–2 millimetres (0.020–0.079 in) long, filiformed, and have the same features as the branches. The spikelets also carry fertile one which have a 0.2 millimetres (0.0079 in) long rhachilla which is pilosed. It callus is hairy with its hairs being 0.6–0.75 millimetres (0.024–0.030 in) long, barely reaching the lemma. Its lemma have a toothed apex which is also truncate and awned. The fertile lemma is 2.5–3.5 millimetres (0.098–0.138 in) long and is both membranous and oblong. The species also have an elliptic and hyaline palea which is 0.6–0.7 millimetres (0.024–0.028 in) long of lemma.

=== Glumes, flowers and fruits ===
The glumes are firmer than fertile lemma and are elliptic, membranous, with acute apexes and asperulous surfaces. The flowers have two lodicules and two stigmas. They also have three stamens which are 2–2.5 millimetres (0.079–0.098 in) long with it fruits being caryopsis and fusiformed with an additional pericarp. The fruits also have a farinosed endosperm and punctiform hilum.

== Distribution ==
Calamagrostis stricta is found in wetlands throughout Eurasia (including Siberia) and into Mongolia and China. It is also common in Canada and the United States to which it was possibly introduced.
