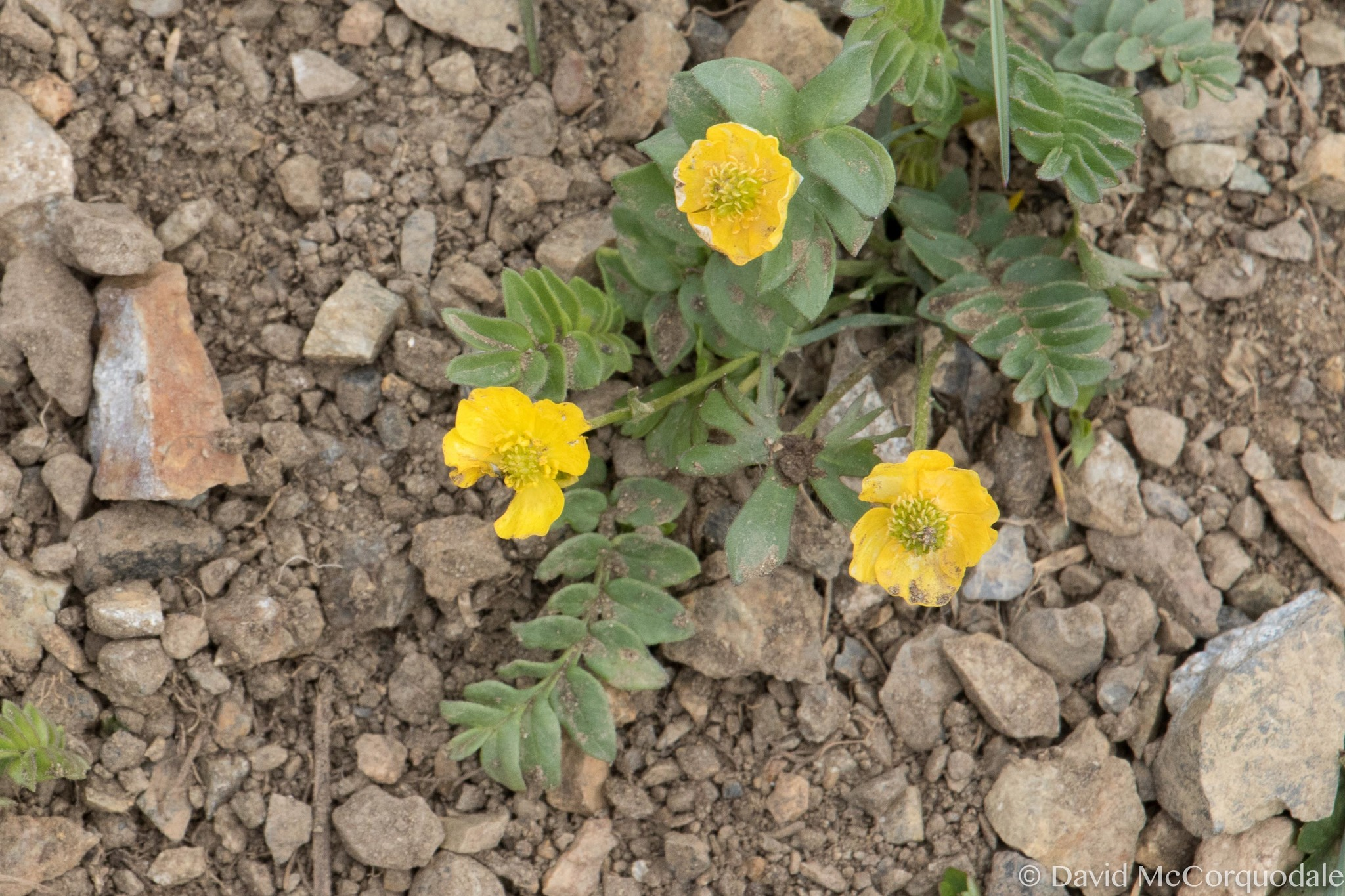

Scientific classification
- Kingdom: Plantae
- Clade: Tracheophytes
- Clade: Angiosperms
- Clade: Eudicots
- Order: Ranunculales
- Family: Ranunculaceae
- Genus: Ranunculus
- Species: R. arcticus

Binomial name
- Ranunculus arcticus Richardson

Synonyms
- Ranunculus affinis R. Br., 1823; Ranunculus eastwoodianus L.D. Benson, 1940; Ranunculus pedatifidus auct., 1814

= Ranunculus arcticus =

Species of flowering plant

Ranunculus arcticus, the birdfoot buttercup, is a species of buttercup in the family Ranunculaceae. It has a circumpolar distribution in Northern Europe, Northern Asia and North America.

== Description ==
Ranunculus arcticus is a perennial herb growing to a height of about 25 cm (10 in). It has a single erect flowering stem or forms a small tuft of several stems. There is a basal rosette of leaves and other leaves grow alternately up the stem. The basal leaves have thick, well-veined sheaths which remain as fibres at the base of the stem for several years. The petiole is much longer than the rather small leaves; the leaf blades are palmate, with a single wide central lobe and two wide lateral lobes which are dissected into several finger-shaped processes. The inflorescence consists of a single flower or a short cyme with two or three flowers. The flowers are radially symmetrical and have parts in fives. The sepals are ovate or obovate, green or pale brown, and felted with white hairs. The petals are bright yellow, wider than they are long, overlapping and plicate. Ten to fifteen stamens surround the elongated receptacle which is six times as tall as it is broad and is covered with white hairs. The fruit is an elongated cluster of nutlets, each of which has a sharply-angled or hooked beak.

== Distribution and habitat ==
Ranunculus arcticus has a circumpolar distribution, being found in Greenland, Svalbard, Fennoscandia, Northern Russia, Alaska and Canada, mostly in the Arctic zones. It is a sun-loving plant and typically grows on moderately dry, well-drained heaths and meadows, grassy slopes, tundra, gravel, sand, and rocks, mostly on neutral or alkaline soils.

== Ecology ==
Although the Greenland buttercup (Ranunculus auricomus), a closely related species, sets seeds by apomixis (asexually), R. arcticus is assumed to be insect-pollinated. The seeds set well and are readily dispersed by animals when the hooked beaks of the seeds adhere to the animal's fur.
