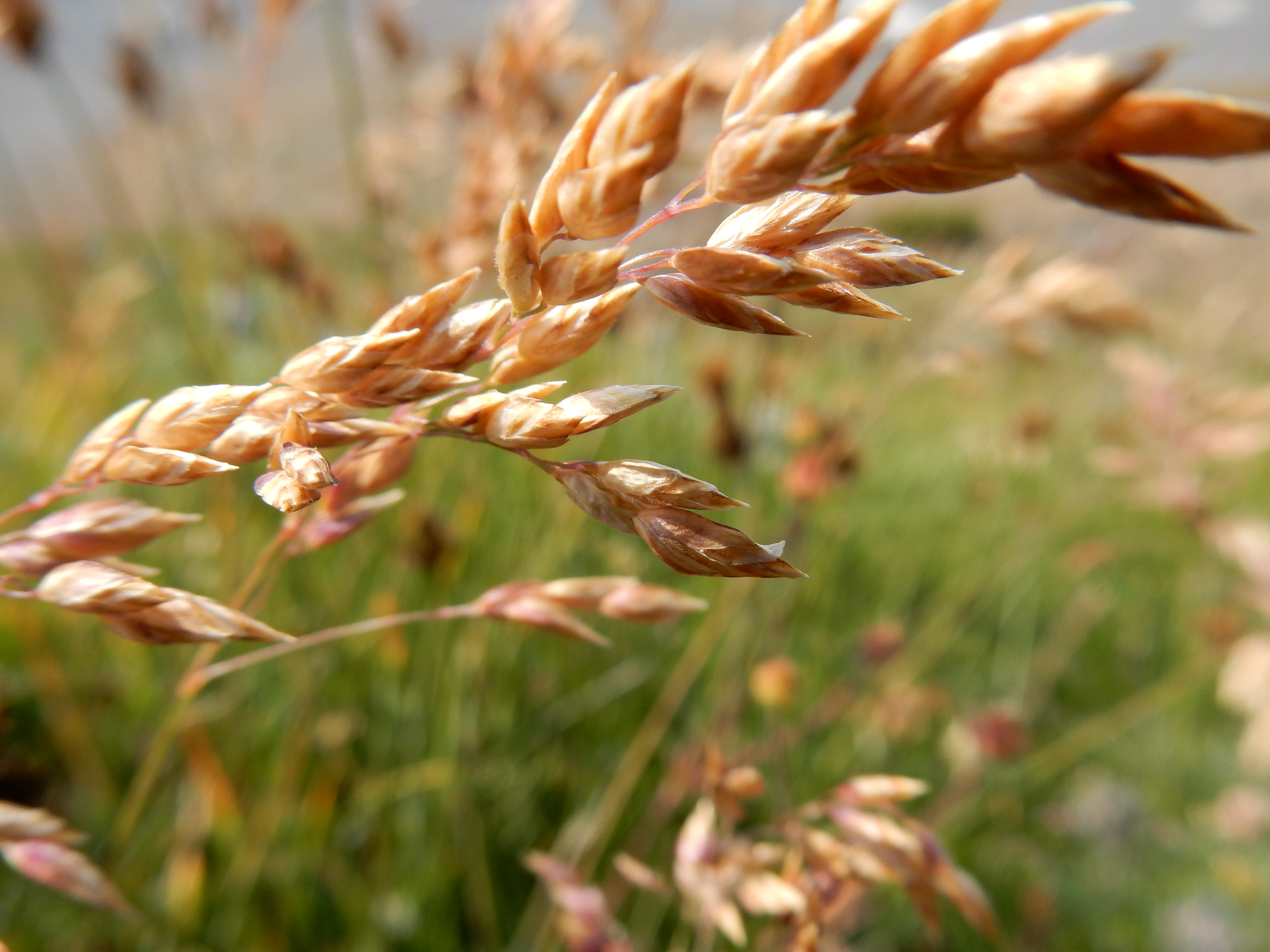
- Panicle
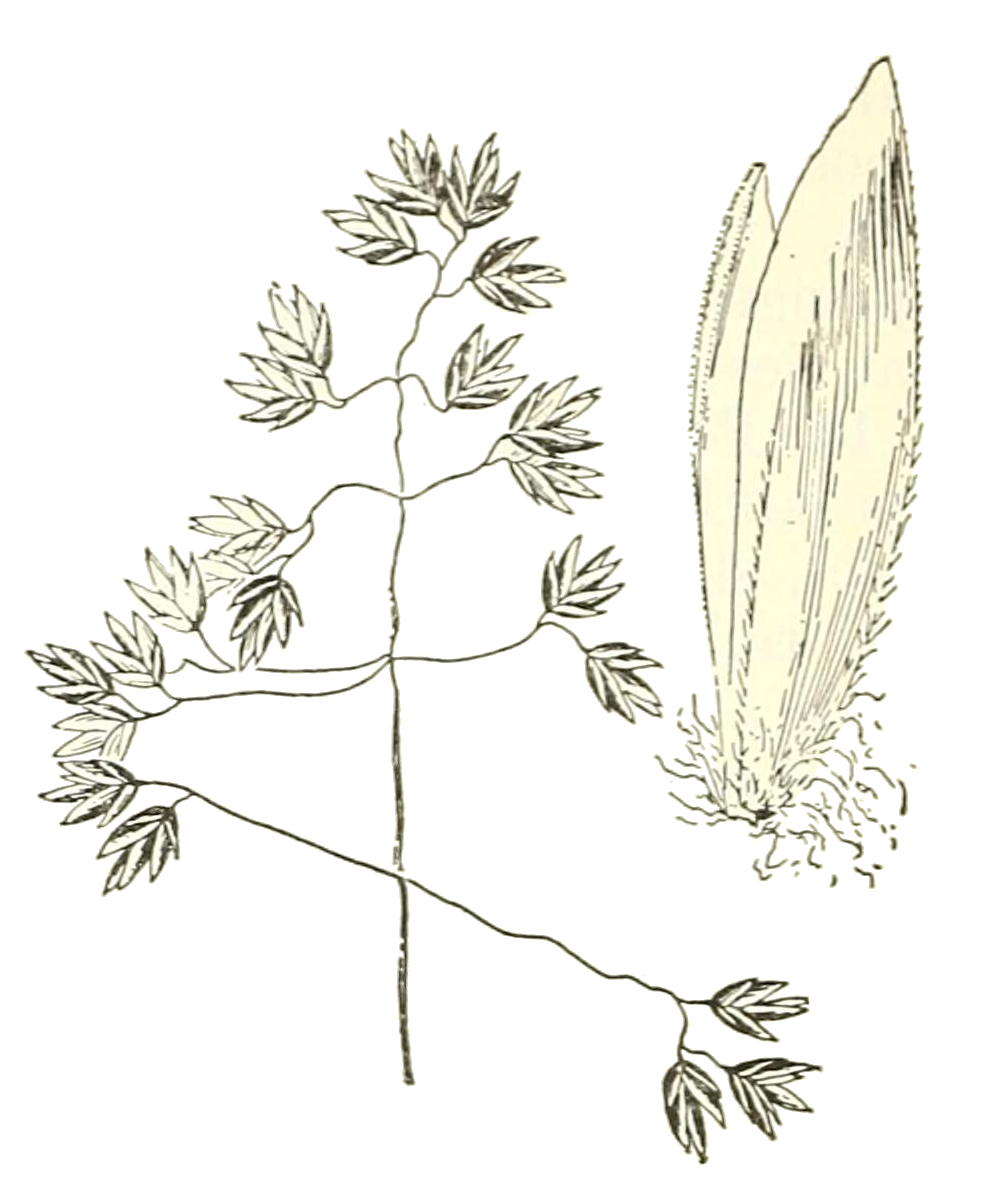
- Botanical illustratiom

Scientific classification
- Kingdom: Plantae
- Clade: Embryophytes
- Clade: Tracheophytes
- Clade: Angiosperms
- Clade: Monocots
- Clade: Commelinids
- Order: Poales
- Family: Poaceae
- Subfamily: Pooideae
- Genus: Poa
- Species: P. arctica

Binomial name
- Poa arctica R.Br.

Subspecies
- Poa arctica subsp. arctica; Poa arctica subsp. depauperata (Fr.) Nannf.

Synonyms
- Poa cenisia subsp. arctica (R.Br.) K.Richt.

= Poa arctica =

Species of plant

Poa arctica, the Arctic bluegrass or Arctic meadow grass, is a species of flowering plant in the family Poaceae, with a subarctic circumpolar distribution, extending into the Rockies. Often a dominant species in the tundra, it responds positively to disturbance.

== Description ==
Poa arctica is a perennial grass that spreads by rhizomes and often shows purplish coloration. Stems are 7–60 cm tall. Leaves are narrow, smooth, and hairless, with ligules 2–7 mm long. The flowering panicles are 3.5–15 cm long, open and sparse, bearing 10–40 spikelets. Spikelets are 4.5–8 mm long, laterally compressed, and contain 2–6 florets. Glumes are lanceolate, sometimes keeled, and usually smooth, with moderately pronounced veins.

== Taxonomy ==
Poa arctica R.Br., described in 1823 from Melville Island, Canada. It is the basionym of Poa cenisia subsp. arctica (R.Br.) K.Richt., published in Plantae Europaeae 1: 83 (1890).
