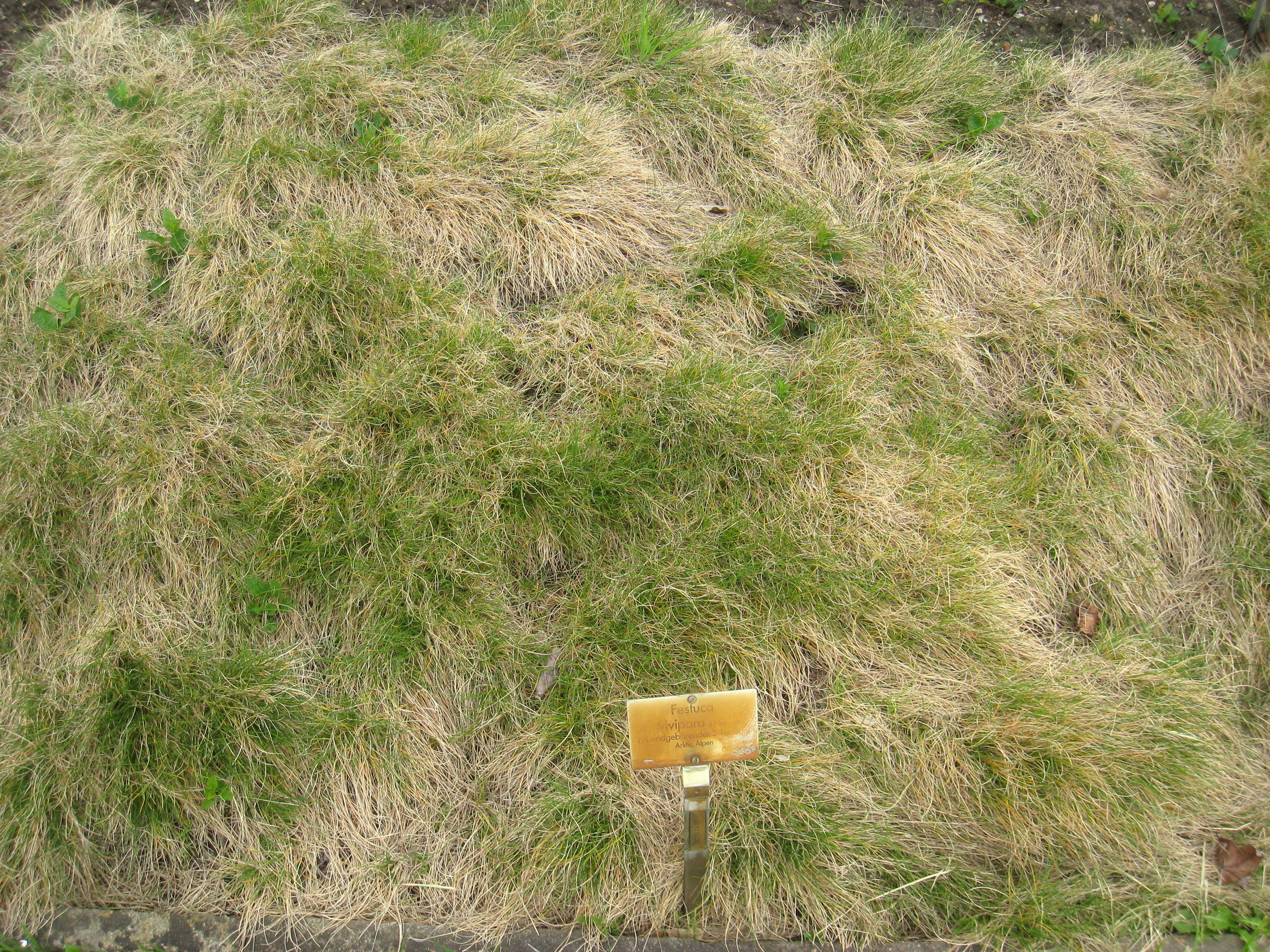

Scientific classification
- Kingdom: Plantae
- Clade: Tracheophytes
- Clade: Angiosperms
- Clade: Monocots
- Clade: Commelinids
- Order: Poales
- Family: Poaceae
- Subfamily: Pooideae
- Genus: Festuca
- Species: F. vivipara

Binomial name
- Festuca vivipara (L.) Sm.

= Festuca vivipara =

Species of grass

Festuca vivipara, the viviparous sheep's-fescue, is a species of grass native to northern Europe, northern Asia, and subarctic North America. The specific epithet vivipara is Latin, referring to the florets' alteration to leafy tufts. The plant can have a diploid number of 28, 49, 56, or 63, though numbers of 21, 35, and 42 have also been reported.

== Description ==
Festuca vivipara is a perennial grass growing 5–20 cm (2.0–7.9 in) tall with capillary culms. The plant grows in dense tufts. The internodes are glabrous or somewhat puberulent. Dead leaf sheaths either persist or shred into fibers, while living sheaths are tinged purple and have a prominent midvein. The auricle is occasionally marked by a distinct swelling. The erose ligule is 0.2–0.5 mm (0.0079–0.0197 in) long. The setaceous leaf blades somewhat stiff, and the flag leaf blade is about 0.5–2.5 cm (0.20–0.98 in) long. In a cross-section, the leaf blade is typically 0.5–0.9 mm (0.020–0.035 in) wide and 0.25–0.6 mm (0.0098–0.0236 in) thick. In the cross-section, sclerenchyma are arranged in three large bundles and up to four smaller bundles, with adaxial sclerenchyma either somewhat developed along the margin to a thick subepidermal band. The strongly proliferous, compact panicles are 2–10 cm (0.79–3.94 in) long, with flowers as leafy tufts. The purplish spikelets are 0.7–3.5 cm (0.28–1.38 in) long. The glumes are much shorter than the spikelets and have erose margins. The lower glume is 2.0–4.5 mm (0.079–0.177 in) long with one vein, and the upper glume is 3–5 mm (0.12–0.20 in) long with three veins. The membraneous, awnless lemmas are 4–6 mm (0.16–0.24 in) long when not modified, and are strongly inrolled. The paleas are absent or reduced. Lodicules are toothed when present and lack hairs.

The grass flowers from July into early August.

== Distribution and habitat ==
Festuca vivipara occurs in North America from Greenland and Labrador to Alaska, growing on calcareous rock and peat, and can occur in western Newfoundland, the Shickshock Mountains, and parts of Quebec. Elsewhere, the grass occurs in northern Europe and Russia near lakes and streams.

== Subspecies ==
- Festuca vivipara ssp. glabra
- Festuca vivipara ssp. hirsuta
