= Festuca hyperborea =

Scientific classification
- Kingdom: Plantae
- Clade: Tracheophytes
- Clade: Angiosperms
- Clade: Monocots
- Clade: Commelinids
- Order: Poales
- Family: Poaceae
- Subfamily: Pooideae
- Genus: Festuca
- Species: F. hyperborea

Binomial name
- Festuca hyperborea Holmen

Synonyms
- Festuca hyperborea Holmen ex Fred. in Bot. Not. 130: 273 (1977), nom. illeg.

Species of grass

Festuca hyperborea also known as the boreal fescue, is a species of grass in the family Poaceae. This species is native to Greenland, Kamchatka, Krasnoyarsk, Labrador, Magadan, North European Russia, Northwest Territories, Nunavut, Québec, Svalbard, Yakutskiya, and Yukon. It is perennial and mainly grows in subalpine or subarctic biomes. Festuca hyperborea was first described in 1957.
