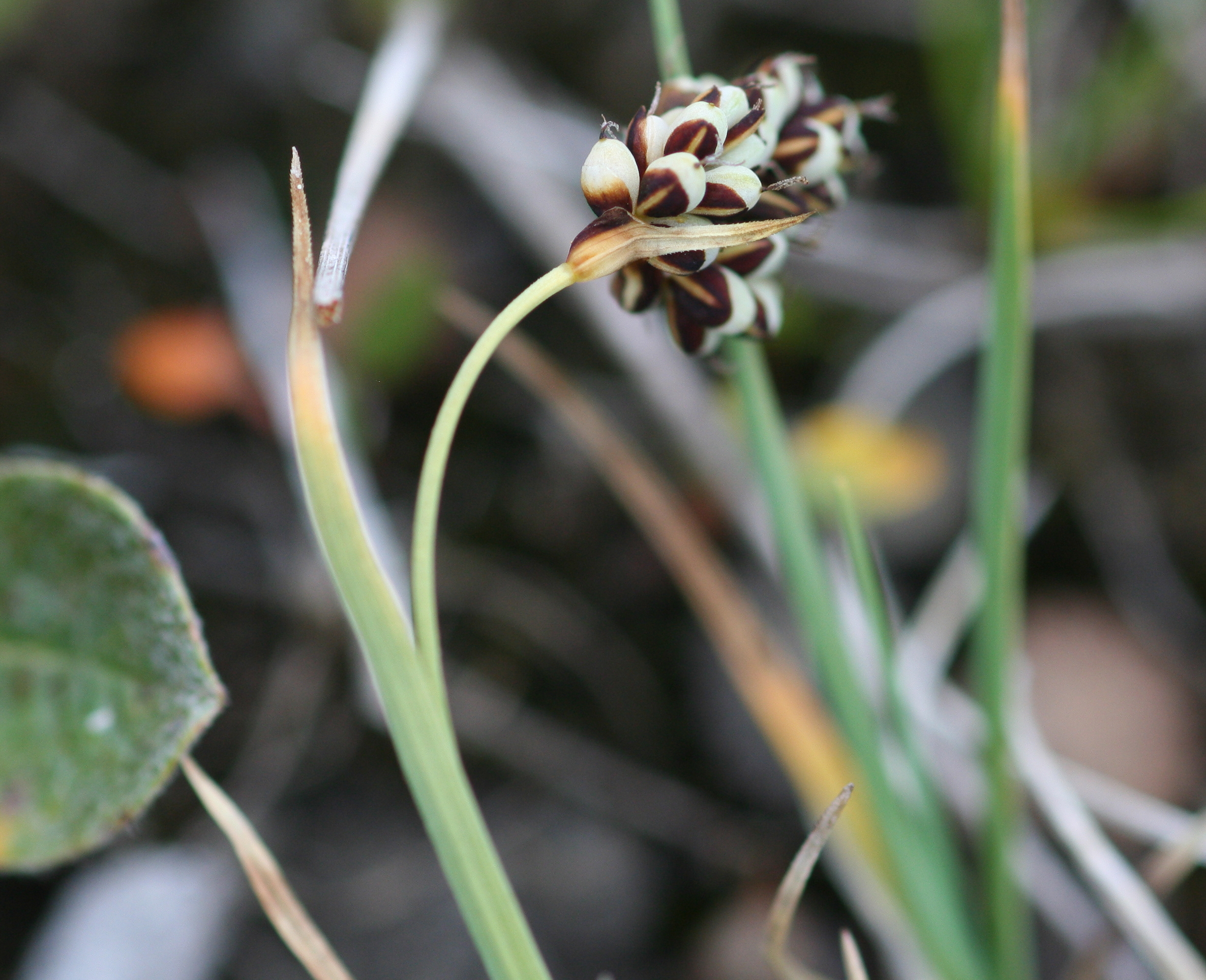

Conservation status
- Least Concern (IUCN 3.1)

Scientific classification
- Kingdom: Plantae
- Clade: Tracheophytes
- Clade: Angiosperms
- Clade: Monocots
- Clade: Commelinids
- Order: Poales
- Family: Cyperaceae
- Genus: Carex
- Species: C. bicolor

Binomial name
- Carex bicolor All.

Synonyms
- Homotypic: Vignea bicolor (Bellardi ex All.) Rchb. in J.C.Mössler & H.G.L.Reichenbach; Heterotypic: Carex androgyna Balb.; Carex cenisia Balb.; Carex pusilla Pers.; Carex minima Boullu; Carex bicolor var. minima (Boullu) Nyman

= Carex bicolor =

Species of grass-like plant

Carex bicolor, the bicoloured sedge, is a species of sedge native to North America, Northern Europe and Northern Asia. The International Union for Conservation of Nature has assessed the plant's conservation status as being of least concern because it has a widespread distribution and faces no particular threats.

== Description ==
Carex bicolor is a tufted perennial sedge growing to a height of about 7 to 12 cm (3 to 5 in). The grass-like leaves are mostly basal, greyish-green with blades up to 60 mm (2.4 in) long and 1 mm (0.04 in) wide, linear, strongly keeled, with parallel veins and long pointed tips. The inflorescence has a triangular stem about the same length as the leaves. It bears two or three spikes of small flowers, the terminal spike having staminate flowers for the lowest third and pistillate flowers above. The floral scale is shorter than the perigynium that surrounds the achene and has brown or reddish-black edges with a green midvein.

== Distribution and habitat ==
Carex bicolor has a pan-boreal distribution. In North America it is present in most of Canada, Greenland, in Alaska and the Aleutian Islands. In Northern Europe and Asia, it is present at both low and high altitudes, but further south it is limited to higher altitudes. Its southerly limit is the mountains of Spain, France, Italy, Switzerland and Austria. It often grows in lime-rich habitats such as moist tundra, at the upper edge of beaches, near pools in wet sand, in poorly vegetated marshes and patches of moist bare mud. It often grows in association with other sedges; in Switzerland these are often Carex pallescens, Carex panicea, and Carex vaginata.

Carex bicolor was one of several species of plant not previously known in Britain, that were "discovered" growing on the island of Rùm in the Inner Hebrides in the 1940s by the botanist John William Heslop-Harrison, Professor of Botany at Durham University. These discoveries added to his reputation, but were later cast into doubt after investigations by classical scholar and botanist John Raven, who found that some of the plants were not present on the island at all, while others had been recently planted there; it is now considered that the claim that the plants were indigenous to Rùm was fraudulent.
