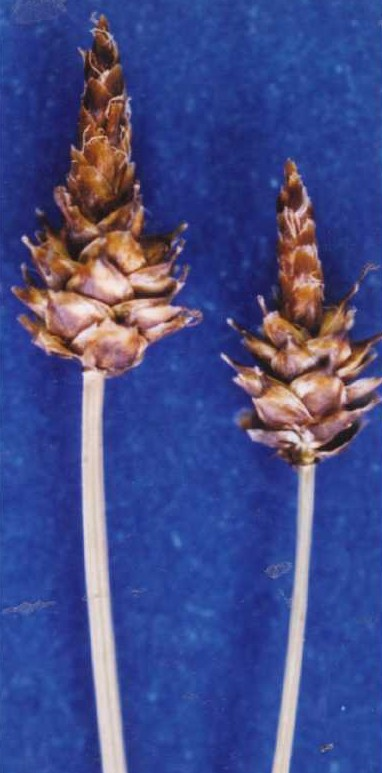

Scientific classification
- Kingdom: Plantae
- Clade: Tracheophytes
- Clade: Angiosperms
- Clade: Monocots
- Clade: Commelinids
- Order: Poales
- Family: Cyperaceae
- Genus: Carex
- Species: C. capitata

Binomial name
- Carex capitata L.

= Carex capitata =

Species of grass-like plant

Carex capitata is a species of sedge known by the common name capitate sedge. It has a circumboreal distribution including Norway, Russia, Siberia, Alaska, Canada and Greenland. Growing in wet places in boreal forests and mountain meadows in alpine climates.

== Description ==
This sedge is a loosely or densely clumping plant growing 10 to 35 centimeters tall. The leaves are quill-like, narrow and rolled tightly. The inflorescence is generally not more than a centimeter long and has several male and female flowers. It reproduces by seed and vegetatively by rhizomes.
