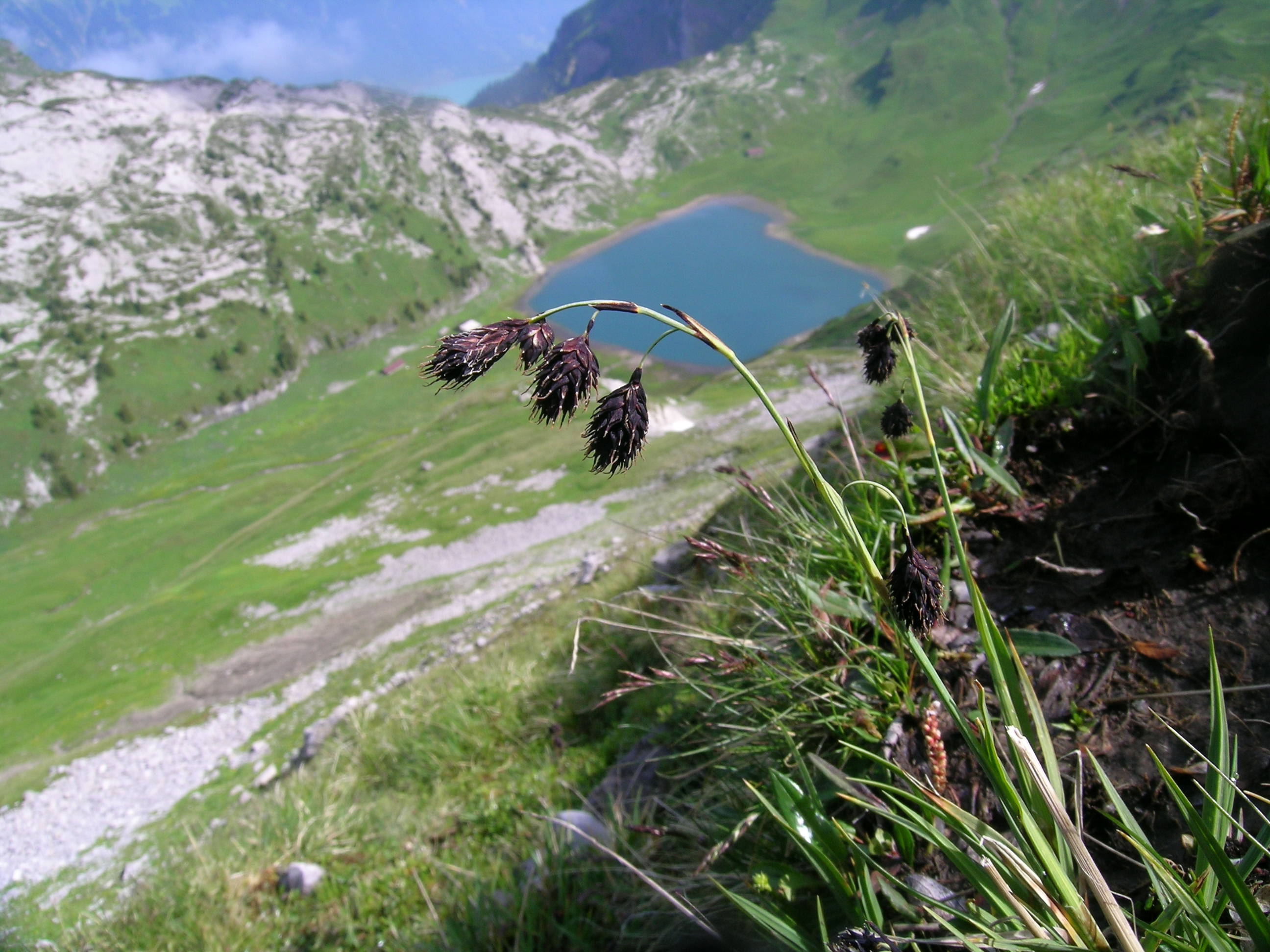

Scientific classification
- Kingdom: Plantae
- Clade: Tracheophytes
- Clade: Angiosperms
- Clade: Monocots
- Clade: Commelinids
- Order: Poales
- Family: Cyperaceae
- Genus: Carex
- Species: C. atrofusca

Binomial name
- Carex atrofusca Schkuhr

Synonyms
- Carex ustulata Wahlenb.

= Carex atrofusca =

Species of grass-like plant

Carex atrofusca, the dark brown sedge or scorched alpine sedge, is a species of sedge with a circumpolar or circumboreal distribution in the northern hemisphere.

== Description ==
Carex atrofusca is a perennial cespitose loosely tufted sedge approximately 6–30 cm high. Sheaths present and persisting, brown - yellowish brown. Leaves are 3–4 mm in with approximately half as long as flowering stems. It is monoecious, with 2-4 spikes, top most one male and 1-3 female spikes nodding.
