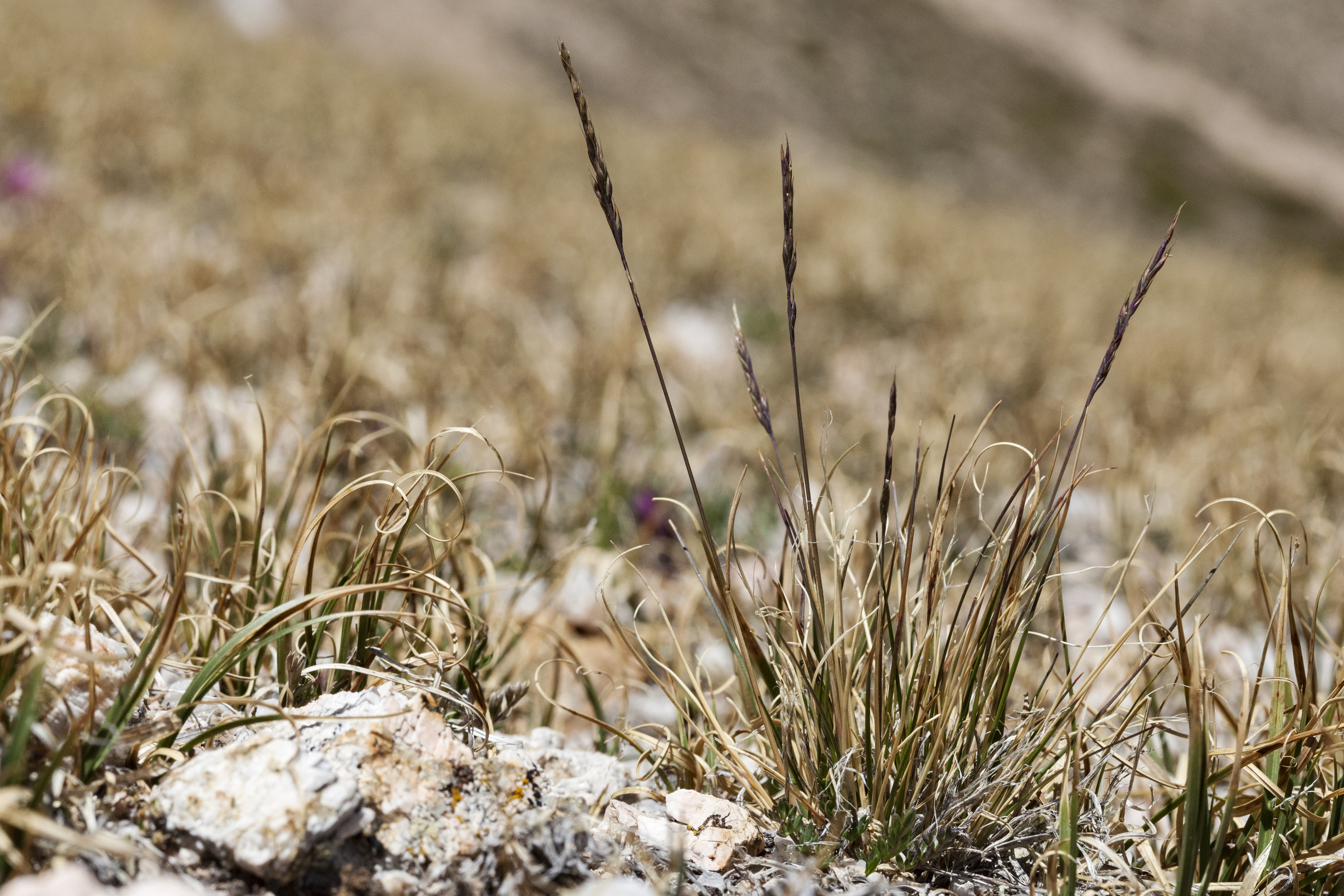

Scientific classification
- Kingdom: Plantae
- Clade: Tracheophytes
- Clade: Angiosperms
- Clade: Monocots
- Clade: Commelinids
- Order: Poales
- Family: Poaceae
- Subfamily: Pooideae
- Genus: Festuca
- Species: F. brachyphylla

Binomial name
- Festuca brachyphylla Schultes

Synonyms
- Festuca brachyphylla subsp. breviculmis Fred.; Festuca brachyphylla subsp. coloradensis Fred.; Festuca brachyphylla f. flavida Polunin; Festuca brachyphylla var. groenlandica Schol.; Festuca brevifolia R.Br.; Festuca brevifolia var. arctica St.-Yves; Festuca groenlandica (Schol.) Fred.; Festuca jensenii Gjaerev. & Ryvarden; Festuca jouldosensis D.M.Chang; Festuca ovina subsp. brachyphylla (Schult.) Piper; Festuca ovina subsp. brevifolia (S.Watson) Hack.; Festuca ovina var. brevifolia S.Watson; Festuca ovina subsp. purpusiana St.-Yves

= Festuca brachyphylla =

Species of grass

Festuca brachyphylla, commonly known as alpine fescue or short-leaved fescue, is a grass native to Eurasia, North America, and the Arctic. The grass is used for erosion control and revegetation. The specific epithet brachyphylla means "short-leaved". The grass has a diploid number of 28, 42, or 44. This species was first described in 1827.

== Description ==
Festuca brachyphylla is a bright green perennial grass that is tufted or loosely cespitose and erect, growing without rhizomes. The grass has slender, low growing culms measuring 2–35 cm (0.79–13.78 in) tall that can reach 55 cm (22 in) when the grass is cultivated. The culms are glabrous and somewhat scabrous, becoming more puberulent towards the inflorescence, and are occasionally tinged purple at their base. The smooth or scabrous leaf sheaths are closed for half of their length. The sheaths remain at the basal tuft when dead. The ligules measure 0.1–0.4 mm (0.0039–0.0157 in). The capillary leaf blade are long and soft, measuring 2–6 cm (0.79–2.36 in) long and 0.5–1 mm (0.020–0.039 in) wide, and arise from the basal tuft. The inflorescences are typically cylindrical or ovoid panicles that are 1–3 cm (0.39–1.18 in) long, though they can occasionally be racemes. The panicles have one to two erect branches at each node that sometimes become spreading during anthesis. The pedicellate spikelets are purplish or bronze. The spikelets measure 3.5–7 mm (0.14–0.28 in), each with two to four florets. The glabrous glumes are ovate to lanceolate and are much shorter than the spikelets. The lower glumes are 1.8–3 mm (0.071–0.118 in) and the upper glumes are 2.6–4 mm (0.10–0.16 in). The elliptical or lanceolate lemmas are membranous and become scabrous towards their apex. The lemmas are 2.5–4.5 mm (0.098–0.177 in) long. The terminal awns are 1–3 mm (0.039–0.118 in) long. The paleas are 3–5.5 mm (0.12–0.22 in) long. The anthers are 0.5–1 mm (0.020–0.039 in) long. These short anthers distinguish the species from Festuca ovina.

The spikelets are colored red to purple by anthocyanin pigments.

The plant flowers from late June into July.

== Distribution and habitat ==
Festuca brachyphylla is circumpolar and alpine, occurring in North America throughout Canada and along the Rocky Mountains, growing as far south as New Mexico and California.

Festuca brachyphylla grows in rocky places at high altitudes, from 2,800–4,300 m (9,200–14,100 ft). It occurs in wet meadows, along streams, on riverbeds, on dry gravel, and on dry slopes.
