= Flora of Svalbard =

Vascular plant species of the archipelago of Svalbard

There are over 190 vascular plant species on the Norwegian Arctic archipelago of Svalbard. This figure does not include algae, mosses, and lichens, which are non-vascular plants. For an island so far north, this number of species constitutes an astonishing variety of plant life. Because of the harsh climate and the short growing season, all the plants are slow growing. They seldom grow higher than 10 cm (4 in)

In some areas, especially in warmer valleys, the plants produce carpets of blossoms. Svalbard has been divided into four vegetation zones.

== Plant species ==
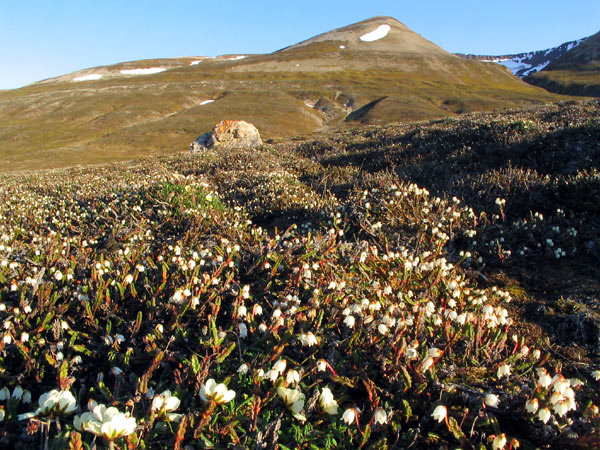
Arctic bell-heather

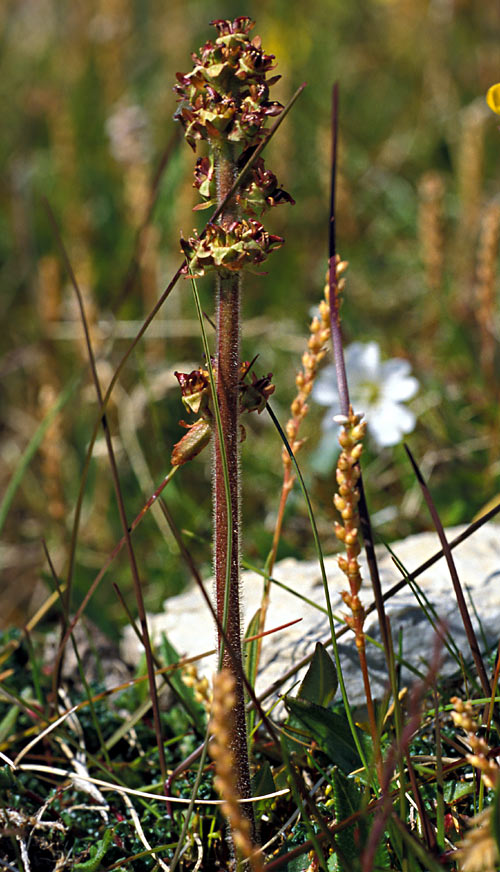
Hawkweed-leaved saxifrage

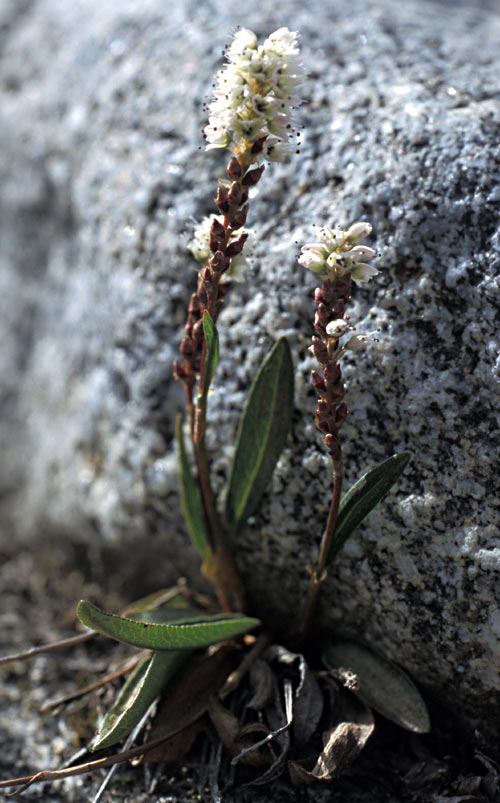
Alpine bistort

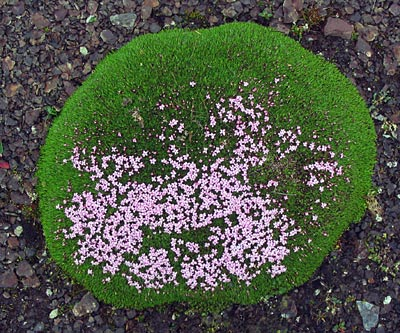
Moss campion

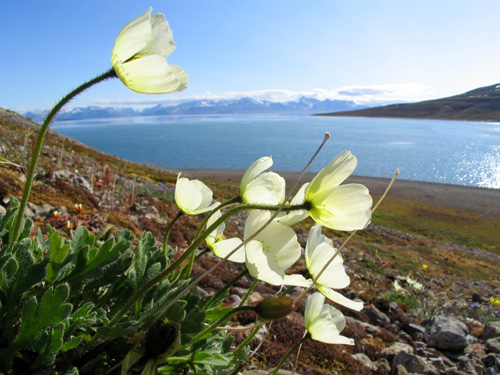
Svalbard poppy

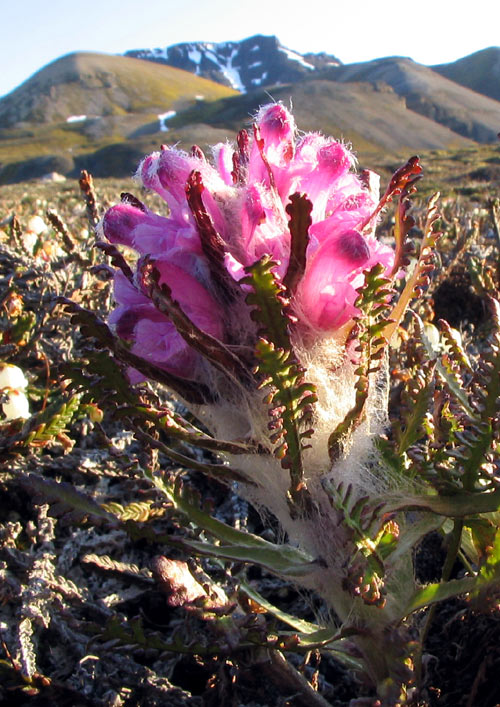
Woolly lousewort

- Achillea millefolium L. (introduced)
- Alchemilla glomerulans Buser
- Alchemilla subcrenata Buser (introduced)
- Alopecurus magellanicus Lam.
- Anthriscus sylvestris L.
- Arabis alpina L. – Alpine rock-cress
- Arctagrostis latifolia (R.Br.) Griseb.
- × Arctodupontia scleroclada (Rupr.) Tzvelev
- Arenaria humifusa Wahlenb.
- Arenaria pseudofrigida (Ostenf. & O.C.Dahl) Steffen – fringed sandwort
- Barbarea vulgaris W.T.Aiton (introduced)
- Betula nana L. – dwarf birch
- Bistorta vivipara (L.) Delarbre
- Braya purpurascens (R.Br.) Bunge ex Ledeb. – purplish braya
- Botrychium boreale Milde
- Botrychium lunaria (L.) Sw.
- Cakile arctica Pobed. (extinct in Svalbard)
- Calamagrostis purpurascens R.Br.
- Calamagrostis stricta (Timm) Koeler
- Campanula giesekiana Vest ex Schult.
- Campanula uniflora L.
- Cardamine bellidifolia L.
- Cardamine nymanii Gand. – polar cress
- Carex bigelowii Torr. ex Schwein.
- Carex capillaris L.
- Carex dioica L.
- Carex × flavicans (F.Nyl.) F.Nyl.
- Carex fuliginosa Schkuhr
- Carex glacialis Mack.
- Carex glareosa Schkuhr ex Wahlenb.
- Carex incurviformis Mack.
- Carex krausei Boeckeler
- Carex lachenalii Schkuhr
- Carex × langeana Fernald
- Carex × lidii Hadac
- Carex marina Dewey
- Carex maritima Gunnerus
- Carex nardina (Hornem.) Fr.
- Carex parallela (Laest.) Sommerf.
- Carex × reducta Drejer
- Carex rupestris All.
- Carex saxatilis L.
- Carex subspathacea Wormsk. ex Hornem.
- Carex ursina Dewey
- Cassiope tetragona (L.) D.Don – Arctic bell-heather
- Cerastium alpinum L.
- Cerastium arcticum Lange – Arctic mouse-ear chickweed
- Cerastium cerastoides (L.) Britton
- Cerastium regelii Ostenf.
- Cherleria biflora (L.) A.J.Moore & Dillenb.
- Chrysosplenium tetrandrum (N.Lund) Th.Fr.
- Cochlearia groenlandica L.
- Comastoma tenellum (Rottb.) Toyok.
- Cystopteris fragilis (L.) Bernh.
- Deschampsia cespitosa (L.) P.Beauv.
- Draba × algida Adams ex DC.
- Draba alpina L.
- Draba arctica J.Vahl
- Draba × asplundii O.E.Schulz (endemic)
- Draba cinerea Adams
- Draba corymbosa R.Br. ex DC.
- Draba daurica DC.
- Draba fladnizensis Wulfen
- Draba hirta L.
- Draba lactea Adams – Lapland whitlow-grass
- Draba × lastrungica O.E.Schulz (endemic)
- Draba micropetala Hook.
- Draba nivalis Lilj.
- Draba norvegica Gunnerus
- Draba oxycarpa Sommerf.
- Draba pauciflora R.Br.
- Draba × schaeferi O.E.Schulz (endemic)
- Draba subcapitata Simmons
- Draba × ursorum Gand. (endemic)
- Dryas octopetala L. – mountain avens
- Dupontia fisheri R.Br.
- Empetrum nigrum L. – crowberry
- Equisetum arvense L.
- Equisetum scirpoides Michx.
- Eriophorum angustifolium Honck.
- Eriophorum scheuchzeri Hoppe – Arctic cottongrass
- Euphrasia frigida Pugsley
- Eutrema edwardsii R.Br.
- Festuca baffinensis Polunin
- Festuca brachyphylla Schult. & Schult.f.
- Festuca heteromalla Pourr.
- Festuca hyperborea Holmen
- Festuca richardsonii Hook.
- Festuca rubra L.
- Festuca vivipara (L.) Sm.
- Harrimanella hypnoides (L.) Coville
- Hippuris lanceolata Retz.
- Honckenya peploides (L.) Ehrh.
- Huperzia arctica (Grossh. ex Tolm.) Sipliv.
- Juncus arcticus Willd.
- Juncus biglumis L.
- Juncus castaneus Sm.
- Juncus effusus L.
- Juncus squarrosus L. (introduced)
- Juncus triglumis L.
- Koenigia islandica L.
- Lolium pratense (Huds.) Darbysh.
- Luzula arcuata (Wahlenb.) Sw.
- Luzula confusa Lindeb. – Arctic wood-rush
- Luzula nivalis (Laest.) Spreng. – tundra wood-rush
- Luzula spicata (L.) DC.
- Luzula wahlenbergii Rupr.
- Mertensia maritima (L.) Gray – oysterleaf
- Micranthes foliolosa (R.Br.) Gornall
- Micranthes hieraciifolia (Waldst. & Kit. ex Willd.) Haw.
- Micranthes nivalis (L.) Small
- Micranthes tenuis (Wahlenb.) Small
- Oxyria digyna (L.) Hill – mountain sorrel
- Papaver cornwallisense D.Löve
- Papaver dahlianum Nordh. – Svalbard poppy
- Pedicularis dasyantha Hadac – woolly lousewort
- Pedicularis hirsuta L. – hairy lousewort
- Phippsia algida (Sol.) R.Br.
- Phippsia concinna (Th.Fr.) Lindeb.
- Pleuropogon sabinei R.Br.
- Poa abbreviata R.Br.
- Poa alpigena Lindm.
- Poa alpina L. – Alpine meadow-grass
- Poa arctica R.Br.
- Poa glauca Vahl
- Poa hartzii Gand.
- Poa pratensis L.
- Polemonium boreale Adams – boreal Jacobs-ladder
- Polygonum aviculare L.
- Potentilla chamissonis Hultén – bluff cinquefoil
- Potentilla crantzii (Crantz) Beck ex Fritsch
- Potentilla hyparctica Malte – Arctic cinquefoil
- Potentilla × insularis Soják (endemic)
- Potentilla × prostrata Rottb.
- Potentilla pulchella R.Br. – tufted cinquefoil
- Potentilla sommerfeltii Lehm.
- Puccinellia angustata (R.Br.) E.L.Rand & Redfield
- Puccinellia phryganodes (Trin.) Scribn. & Merr. – cushioned saltmarsh grass
- Puccinellia tenella (Lange) Holmb.
- Puccinellia vahliana (Liebm.) Scribn. & Merr.
- × Pucciphippsia vacillans (Th.Fr.) Tzvelev
- Ranunculus acris L. (introduced)
- Ranunculus glacialis L.
- Ranunculus hyperboreus Rottb. – Arctic buttercup
- Ranunculus lapponicus L. – Lapland buttercup
- Ranunculus nivalis L. – snow buttercup
- Ranunculus pallasii Schltdl.
- Ranunculus pygmaeus Wahlenb. – pygmy buttercup
- Ranunculus × spitsbergensis Hadac
- Ranunculus sulphureus Sol. – sulphur-coloured buttercup
- Rhodiola rosea L.
- Rubus chamaemorus L. – cloudberry
- Rumex acetosella L.
- Sabulina rossii (R.Br. ex Richardson) Dillenb. & Kadereit
- Sabulina rubella (Wahlenb.) Dillenb. & Kadereit
- Sabulina stricta (Sw.) Rchb.
- Sagina caespitosa Lange
- Sagina nivalis (Lindblad) Fr.
- Salix herbacea L. – snowbed willow
- Salix polaris Wahlenb. – polar willow
- Salix reticulata L.
- Saxifraga aizoides L. – yellow mountain saxifrage
- Saxifraga cernua L. – drooping saxifrage
- Saxifraga cespitosa L. – tufted saxifrage
- Saxifraga hirculus L. – bog saxifrage
- Saxifraga hyperborea R.Br.
- Saxifraga oppositifolia L. – purple saxifrage
- Saxifraga rivularis L. – brook saxifrage
- Saxifraga svalbardensis Øvstedal (endemic)
- Sibbaldia procumbens L.
- Silene acaulis (L.) Jacq. – moss campion
- Silene involucrata (Cham. & Schltdl.) Bocquet
- Silene uralensis (Rupr.) Bocquet
- Stellaria humifusa Rottb. – Arctic chickweed
- Stellaria longipes Goldie
- Stellaria media (L.) Vill.
- Taraxacum acromaurum Dahlst
- Taraxacum arcticum (Trautv.) Dahlst
- Taraxacum brachyceras Dahlst (endemic)
- Taraxacum sect. Ruderalia
- Taraxacum cymbifolium H.Lindb. ex Dahlst.
- Taraxacum recedens (Dahlst.) G.E.Haglund (endemic)
- Taraxacum torvum G.E.Haglund (endemic)
- Tofieldia pusilla (Michx.) Pers.
- Trisetum spicatum (L.) K.Richt.
- Vaccinium uliginosum L. – bog bilberry
- Veronica longifolia L. (introduced)
- Vicia sativa L.
- Woodsia glabella R.Br.
Mountain sorrel

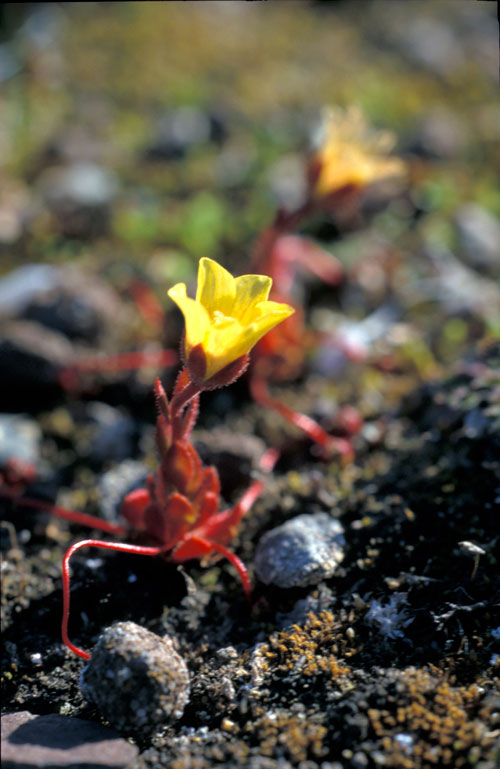
Saxifraga flagellaris

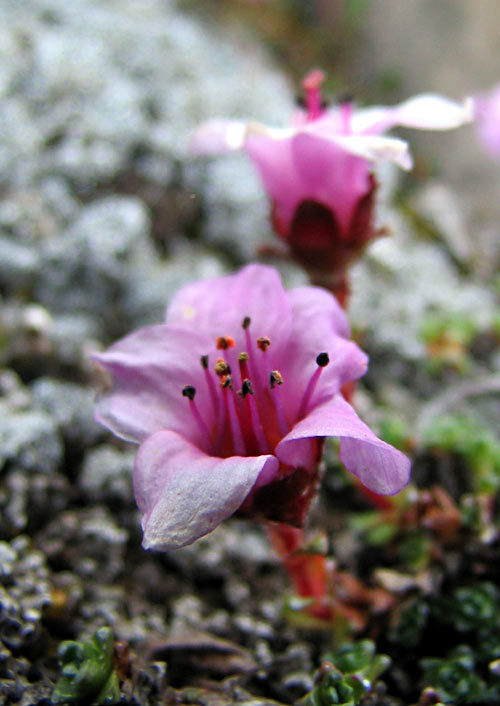
Purple saxifrage

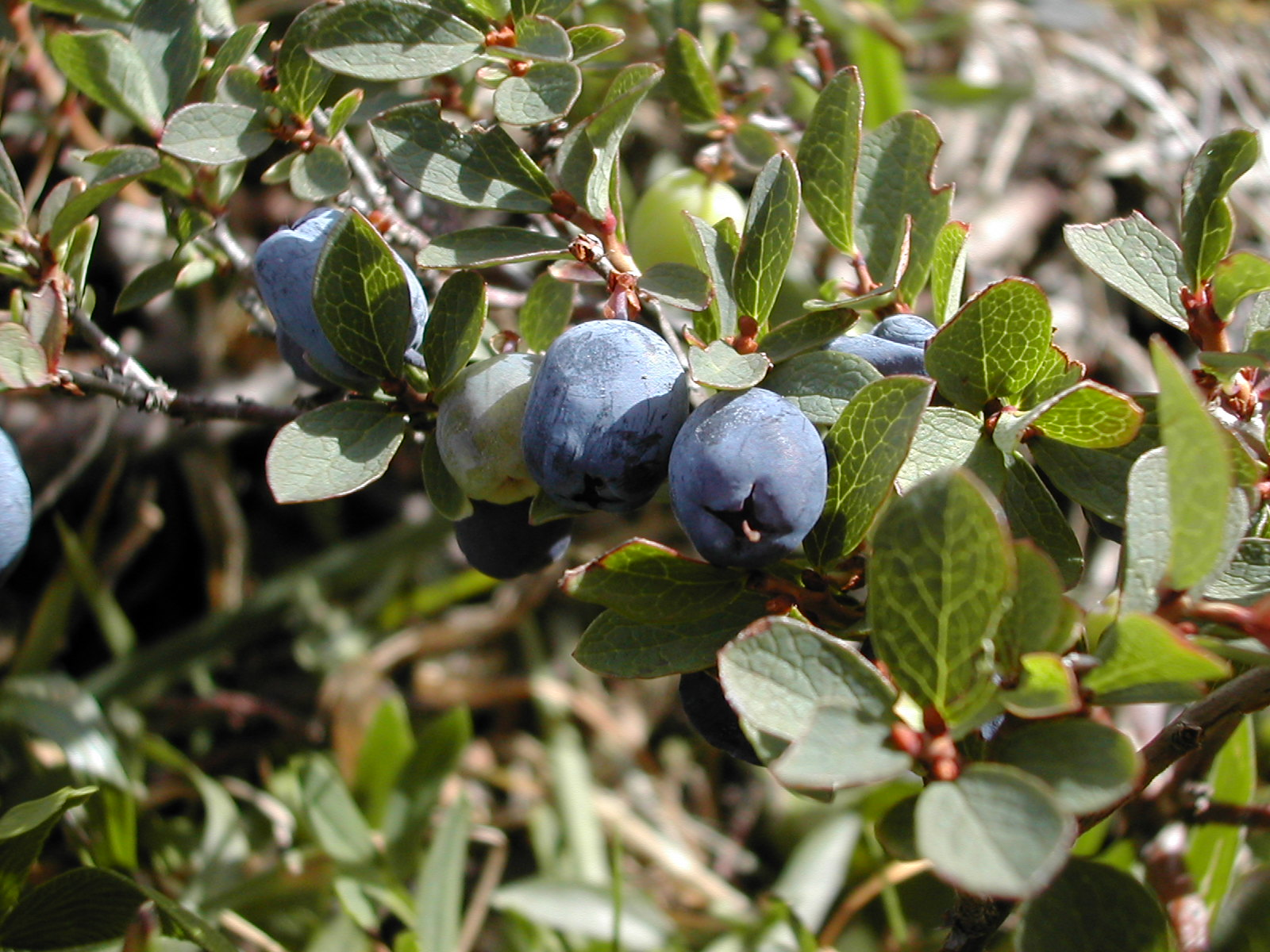
Fruit of Vaccinium uliginosum
