= Draba laevigata =

Draba laevigata can refer to:

- Draba laevigata Cham. & Schltdl., a synonym of Eutrema edwardsii R.Br.
- Draba laevigata Hoppe ex W.D.J.Koch, a synonym of Draba fladnizensis Wulfen
