= Dichodon =

Dichodon may refer to:

- Dichodon (plant), a genus of flowering plants in the family Caryophyllaceae
- Dichodon (mammal), a fossil genus of mammals in the family Xiphodontidae
