= Woolly lousewort =

Woolly lousewort is a common name for several plants and may refer to:

- Pedicularis dasyantha, native to Europe
- Pedicularis lanata, native to Canada and Alaska

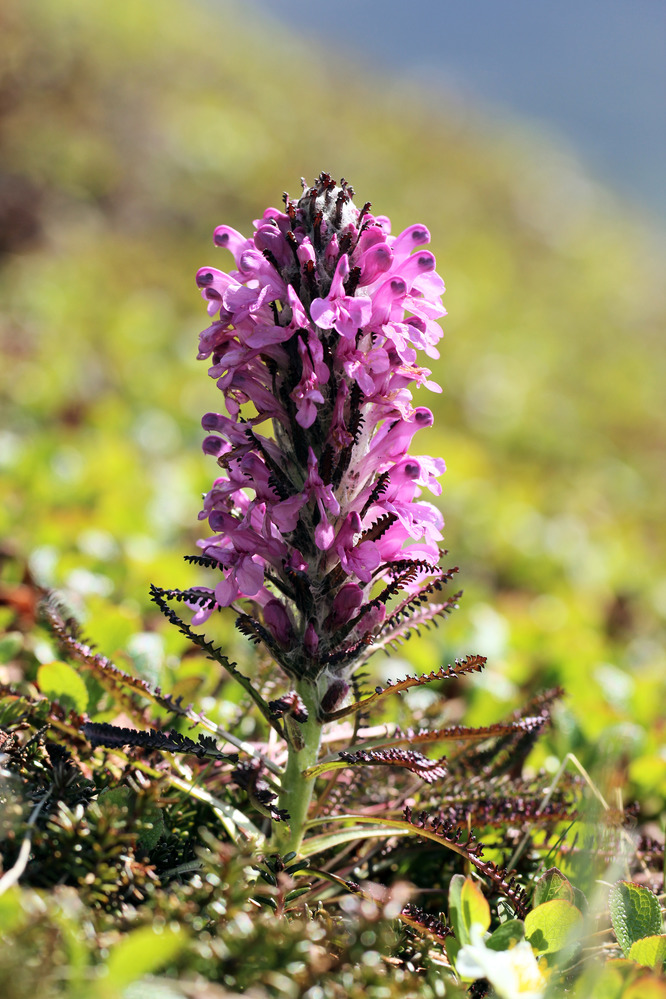
Woolly lousewort (pedicularis lanata)
