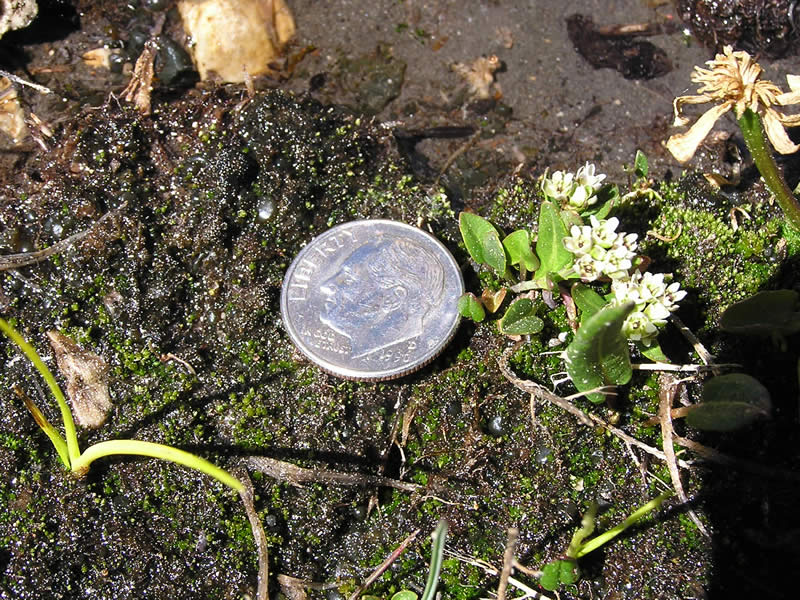

Conservation status
- Imperiled (NatureServe)

Scientific classification
- Kingdom: Plantae
- Clade: Tracheophytes
- Clade: Angiosperms
- Clade: Eudicots
- Clade: Rosids
- Order: Brassicales
- Family: Brassicaceae
- Genus: Eutrema
- Species: E. penlandii

Binomial name
- Eutrema penlandii Rollins

= Eutrema penlandii =

Species of flowering plant

Eutrema penlandii is a rare species of flowering plant in the mustard family known by the common names Mosquito Range mustard, Penland's alpine fen mustard and Penland's eutrema. It is endemic to Colorado in the United States, where it is known only from a small strip of unique mountain habitat measuring 40 kilometers long. It is threatened by mining and associated environmental changes in this part of the Continental Divide in central Colorado. The plant was federally listed as a threatened species of the US in 1993.

== Distribution ==
This plant is the only Eutrema in the lower 48 states and only one of two that occur in North America; its nearest close relative is Eutrema edwardii, a plant of the Arctic. E. penlandii is a small alpine climate species, possibly a relict from the last ice age which persists in the high, cold fens of the Rocky Mountains. Today the plant only occurs in the Mosquito Range, a ridge of mountains in the Rockies. It was first collected by the botanist C. William Penland in 1935 on Hoosier Ridge in the Mosquito Range, and it is one of several rare alpine plants native to the area, such as the globe gilia (Gilia globularis).

== Description ==
This plant is a perennial herb growing about six inches tall and bearing clusters of cream-white flowers in the summer. The alpine habitat of the plant is a wet tundra kept constantly fed with ample water by the surrounding snowfields. Wind melts the snow which runs into the tundra and turns it to a fen, a wetland on limestone substrates. The plant grows in rocky nooks that shelter it from the wind and keep the mossy peat soil saturated, but not flooded. The elevation is at least 3700 meters. The habitat is within a section of the Continental Divide that trends east–west in opposition to the general north–south direction of most of the ranges, and the plants grow on south- and east-facing slopes. There are about eleven occurrences, with populations at Hoosier Ridge, Mount Silverheels, the Mosquito Pass, the Hilltop Mine, Mount Blue Sky, and Loveland Mountain. The total area occupied by the plant is probably around 500 acres (2.0 km^{2}).

== Status ==
=== Threats ===
Mining is a common industry in the high mountain peaks occupied by the plant, and mining companies and stakeholders did not agree with federal protection plans for the species and its habitat. Active claims for gold and trace metals are still in place, though mining activity is currently low because of the status of the market. Activities associated with mining, such as ditching, diking, and trail maintenance, alter the hydrology of the landscape, and this is a major threat to the habitat that the plant depends on. There is a specific water balance maintained by the snowmelt from the high ridges which keeps the soil quite wet but not flooded, and changing the path of flowing water could disrupt it. The plant almost always grows within half a meter of actively flowing meltwater. Mining activity could also lower the pH of the normally alkaline soils.

Other threats include recreational activity including hiking, mountain biking, and the use of off-road vehicles, horses, and burros.
