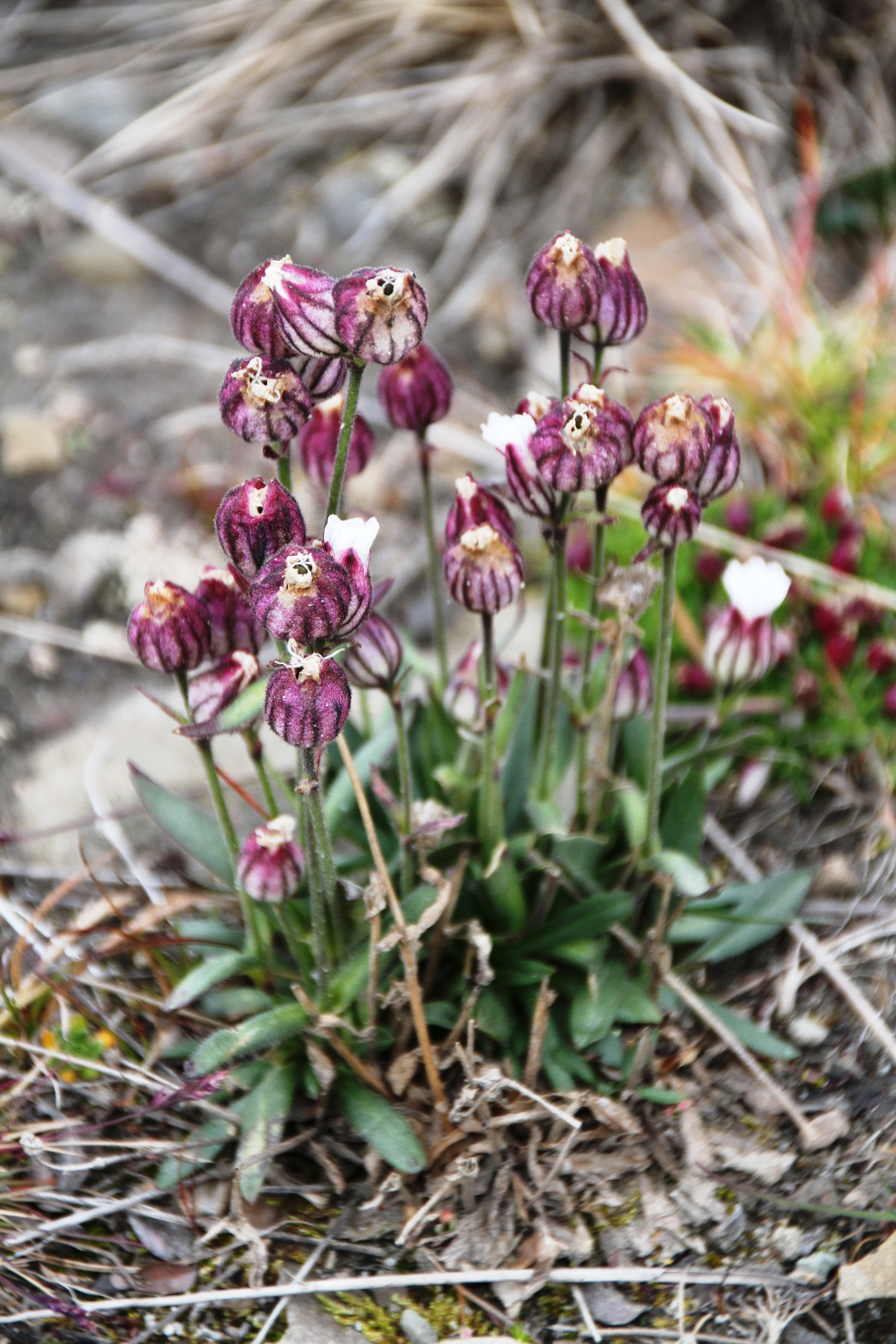

Scientific classification
- Kingdom: Plantae
- Clade: Tracheophytes
- Clade: Angiosperms
- Clade: Eudicots
- Order: Caryophyllales
- Family: Caryophyllaceae
- Genus: Silene
- Species: S. wahlbergella

Binomial name
- Silene wahlbergella Chowdhuri

= Silene wahlbergella =

Species of flowering plant

Silene wahlbergella is a species of flowering plant belonging to the family Caryophyllaceae.

It is native to Northern Europe and Northern Eastern Europe. Specifically, it seems to be restricted to Scandinavia and northwestern Russia. It is sometimes treated synonymously with Silene uralensis.
