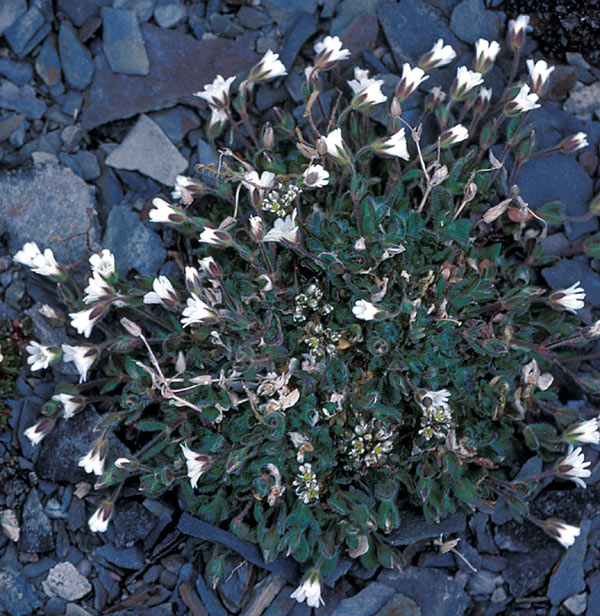

Scientific classification
- Kingdom: Plantae
- Clade: Tracheophytes
- Clade: Angiosperms
- Clade: Eudicots
- Order: Caryophyllales
- Family: Caryophyllaceae
- Genus: Cerastium
- Species: C. arcticum

Binomial name
- Cerastium arcticum Lange

= Cerastium arcticum =

Species of flowering plant

Cerastium arcticum, the Arctic mouse-ear chickweed or Arctic mouse-ear, is a flower found in parts of western and southern Greenland, Baffin Island, Labrador, Iceland, Faroe Islands, Scotland, Norway and Svalbard.

It is a perennial herb that grows in tufts, sometimes loosely, generally in damp places and on open gravel. Most of the plant is pubescent, the hairs appearing stiff. Leaves are elliptical. The flowers are white, rather large, beautiful when fully expanded, single or two together. Petals are deeply notched and considerably longer than sepals.

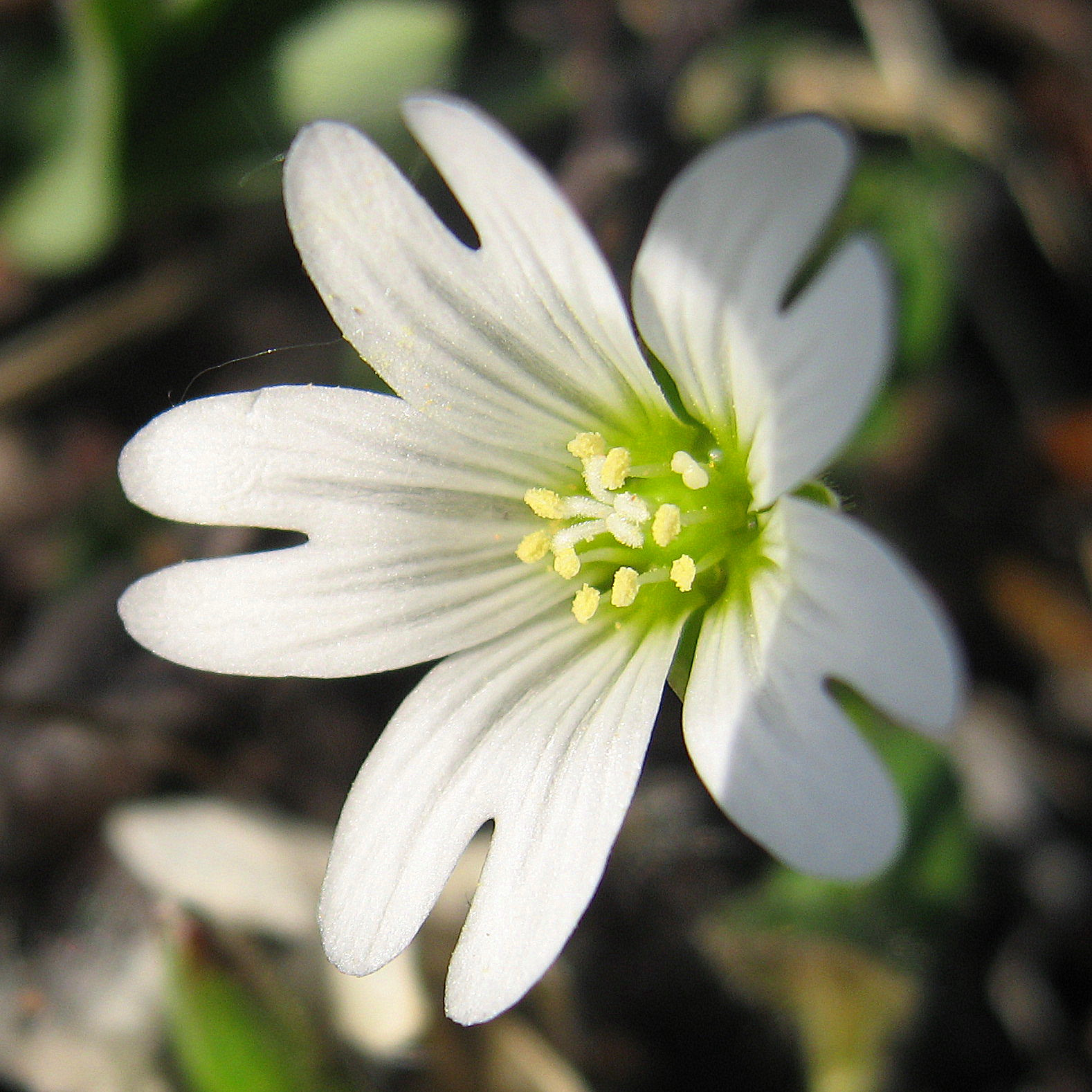
close up

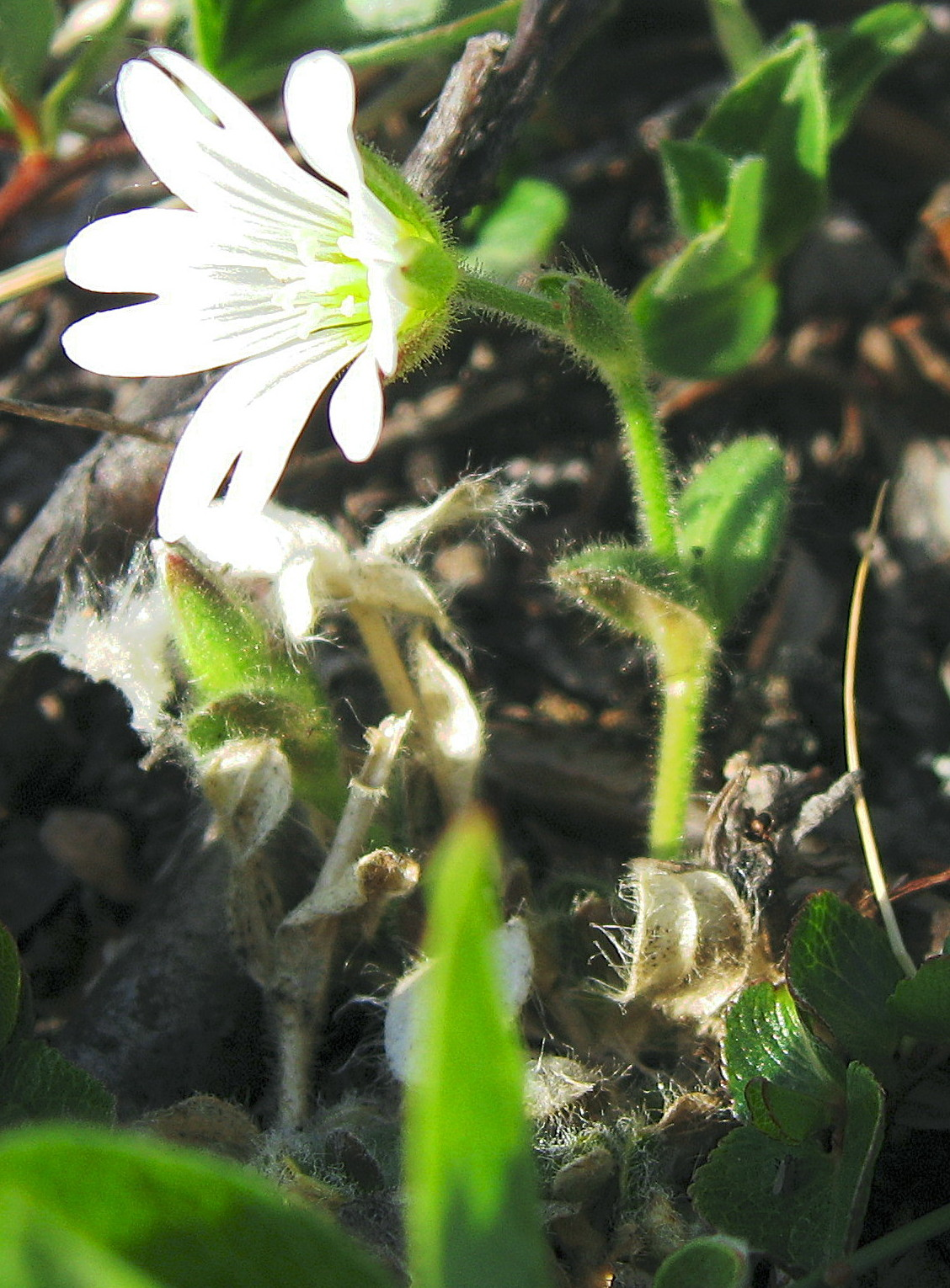
stem

== See also ==
- Flora of Svalbard
