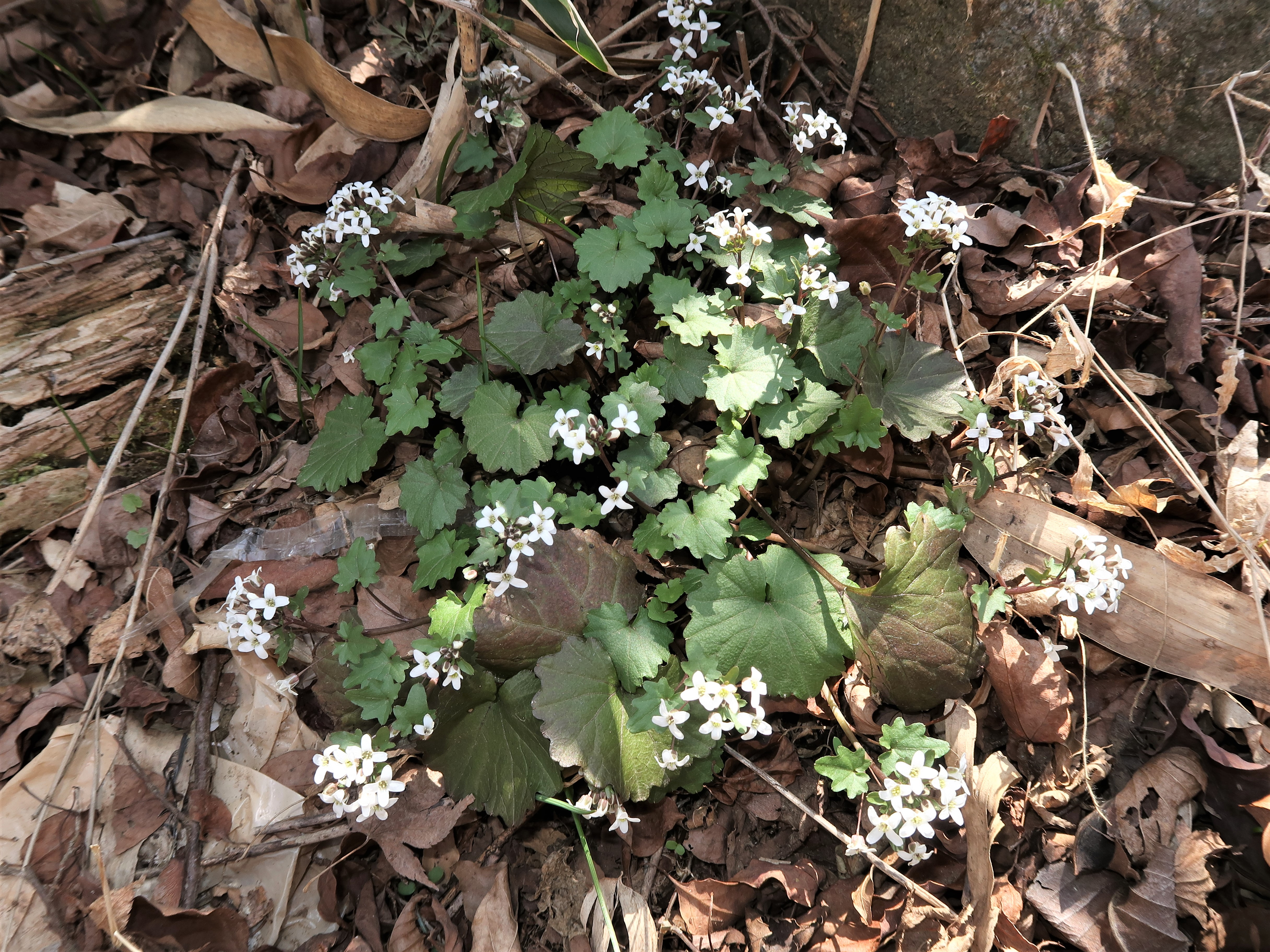
- Eutrema tenue in bloom

Scientific classification
- Kingdom: Plantae
- Clade: Embryophytes
- Clade: Tracheophytes
- Clade: Angiosperms
- Clade: Eudicots
- Clade: Rosids
- Order: Brassicales
- Family: Brassicaceae
- Genus: Eutrema; R.Br. (1824)

Species
- 45; see text

Synonyms
- Chalcanthus Boiss. (1867); Cordatifolium Y.Z.Zhao (2018); Esquiroliella H.Lev. (1916); Glaribraya H.Hara (1978); Hengduanshania Y.Z.Zhao (2018); Martinella H.Lev. (1904), nom. illeg.; Neomartinella Pilg. (1906); Pegaeophyton Hayek & Hand.-Mazz. (1922); Platycraspedum O.E.Schulz (1922); Taphrospermum C.A.Mey. (1831); Thellungiella O.E. Schulz (1924); Wasabia Matsum. (1899)

= Eutrema =

Genus of flowering plants

Eutrema is a genus of flowering plants of the family Brassicaceae, native to the Holarctic. Its best known member is wasabi, Eutrema japonicum. The name comes from the Greek εὐ- (eu-) 'well' et τρῆμα (trêma) 'hole', because of a hole in the septum of the fruit.

It is native to subarctic and subalpine regions of Eurasia and North America and to temperate Asia.

== Species ==
Species accepted by the Plants of the World Online as of April 2024:

- Eutrema altaicum (C.A.Mey.) Al-Shehbaz & Warwick
- Eutrema angustiseptatum (Al-Shehbaz, T.Y.Cheo, L.L.Lu & G.Yang) Al-Shehbaz
- Eutrema baimashanicum Al-Shehbaz, G.Q.Hao & J.Quan Liu
- Eutrema botschantzevii (D.A.German) Al-Shehbaz & Warwick
- Eutrema boufordii Al-Shehbaz
- Eutrema bulbiferum Y.Xiao & D.K.Tian
- Eutrema cordifolium Turcz. ex Ledeb.
- Eutrema deltoideum (Hook.f. & Thomson) O.E.Schulz
- Eutrema edwardsii R.Br.
- Eutrema fontanum (Maxim.) Al-Shehbaz & Warwick
- Eutrema giganteum G.Q.Hao, Al-Shehbaz & J.Quan Liu
- Eutrema grandiflorum (Al-Shehbaz) Al-Shehbaz & Warwick
- Eutrema halophilum (C.A.Mey.) Al-Shehbaz & Warwick
- Eutrema heterophyllum (W.W.Sm.) H.Hara
- Eutrema himalaicum Hook.f. & Thomson
- Eutrema integrifolium (DC.) Bunge
- Eutrema japonicum (Miq.) Koidz. – Japan; "wasabi"; common condiment
- Eutrema lowndesii (H.Hara) Al-Shehbaz & Warwick
- Eutrema minutissimum (O.E.Schulz) D.A.German & Al-Shehbaz
- Eutrema nanum G.Q.Hao, J.Quan Liu & Al-Shehbaz
- Eutrema nepalense (Al-Shehbaz, Kats.Arai & H.Ohba) Al-Shehbaz, G.Q.Hao & J.Quan Liu
- Eutrema parviflorum Turcz. ex Ledeb.
- Eutrema penlandii Rollins – Colorado, United States; "Mosquito Range mustard"
- Eutrema platypetalum (Schrenk) Al-Shehbaz & Warwick
- Eutrema pseudocordifolium Popov
- Eutrema purii (D.S.Rawat, L.R.Dangwal & R.D.Gaur) Al-Shehbaz, G.Q.Hao & J.Quan Liu
- Eutrema racemosum Al-Shehbaz, G.Q.Hao & J.Quan Liu
- Eutrema renifolium (Boiss. & Hohen.) Al-Shehbaz, G.Q.Hao & J.Quan Liu
- Eutrema salsugineum (Pall.) Al-Shehbaz & Warwick – Central Asia to North America; "saltwater cress"; extreme halophyte, model organism for salt tolerance
- Eutrema scapiflorum (Hook.f. & Thomson) Al-Shehbaz, G.Q.Hao & J.Quan Liu
- Eutrema schulzii Al-Shehbaz & Warwick
- Eutrema sherriffii Al-Shehbaz & Warwick
- Eutrema sinense (Hemsl.) G.Q.Hao, J.Quan Liu & Al-Shehbaz
- Eutrema sulphureum (Al-Shehbaz) Al-Shehbaz
- Eutrema tenue (Miq.) Makino – Japan; "yuriwasabi"; probably paraphyletic: some samples are closer to E. yunnanense, others closer to E. japonicum
- Eutrema thibeticum Franch.
- Eutrema tianshanense G.Q.Hao, J.Quan Liu & Al-Shehbaz
- Eutrema verticillatum (Jeffrey & W.W.Sm.) Al-Shehbaz & Warwick
- Eutrema violifolium (H.Lév.) Al-Shehbaz & Warwick
- Eutrema watsonii (Al-Shehbaz) Al-Shehbaz
- Eutrema wuchengyii (Al-Shehbaz, T.Y.Cheo, L.L.Lu & G.Yang) Al-Shehbaz & Warwick
- Eutrema xingshanense (Z.E.Chao, Z.L.Ning & X.W.Hu) G.Q.Hao, Al-Shehbaz & J.Quan Liu
- Eutrema yungshunense (W.T.Wang) Al-Shehbaz & Warwick
- Eutrema yunnanense Franch.
- Eutrema zhuxiense Q.L.Gan & Xin W.Li
