= Eutrema nepalense =

Scientific classification
- Kingdom: Plantae
- Clade: Tracheophytes
- Clade: Angiosperms
- Clade: Eudicots
- Clade: Rosids
- Order: Brassicales
- Family: Brassicaceae
- Genus: Eutrema
- Species: E. nepalense

Binomial name
- Eutrema nepalense (Al-Shehbaz, Arai & H. Ohba) Al-Shehbaz, G.Q.Hao & J.Quan Liu (2017)

Synonyms
- Pegaeophyton nepalense Al-Shehbaz, Kats.Arai & H.Ohba (1998)

Species of flowering plant

Eutrema nepalense is a plant species reported from Nepal, Bhutan, Sikkim, and Tibet. It is found high in the Himalayas at elevations of over 4000 m (13,000 feet).

Eutrema nepalense is a very small perennial herb rarely more than 2 cm tall, with an underground caudex and a rosette of leaves above ground. Leaves have relatively long petioles up to 14 mm long. Blades are ovate to almost round, up to 4 mm wide. Flowers number 3-8 per plant, up to 3 mm across, with white petals. Fruits are egg-shaped to almost spherical, up to 2 mm across, each with 2-4 seeds. It grows among moss, under rocks by streams, and alpine grasslands.

The species was first described in 1998 as Pegaeophyton nepalense. It was renamed Eutrema nepalense in 2017.
