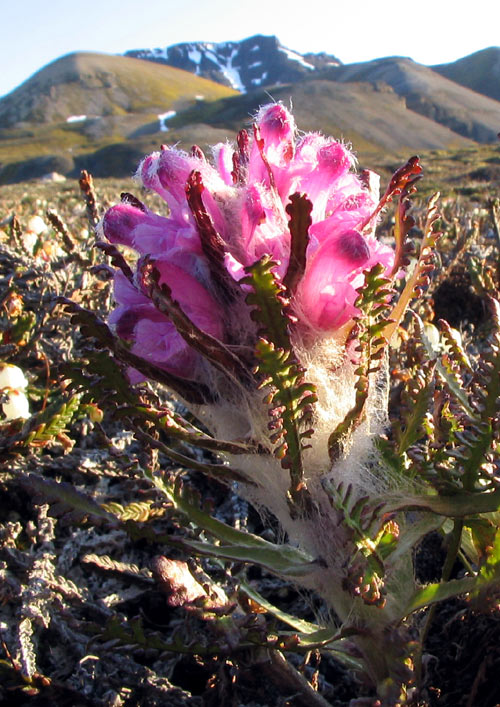

Scientific classification
- Kingdom: Plantae
- Clade: Tracheophytes
- Clade: Angiosperms
- Clade: Eudicots
- Clade: Asterids
- Order: Lamiales
- Family: Orobanchaceae
- Genus: Pedicularis
- Species: P. dasyantha

Binomial name
- Pedicularis dasyantha (Trautv.) Hadac

= Pedicularis dasyantha =

Species of flowering plant

Pedicularis dasyantha, the woolly lousewort or arctic hairy lousewort, is a plant native to the high arctic areas of Svalbard, Novaya Zemlya and the bordering mainland, and the western Taymyr Peninsula. In Svalbard it is restricted to the main island, Spitsbergen.

== Description ==
The plant grows to 10–15 cm tall, with a stout stem, single or a few together, from a thick, yellow taproot. The basal leaves are numerous and pinnately divided into many remote segments. The stem has many leaves, woolly in the uppermost part between the flowers. The flowers are produced in a dense oblong inflorescence, each flower with a red corolla, with the upper tip hairy; the corolla tube is longer than the calyx.

It grows in moist places and on heaths, often together with Dryas octopetala and Cassiope tetragona. Like all Pedicularis it is a hemiparasite and the preferred host is probably Dryas octopetala.

== Genetic diversity ==
Pedicularis dasyantha shows unusually low genetic diversity for a flowering plant species. Studies of 13 geographically isolated populations in the Svalbard Archipelago revealed that among 31 enzyme-coding loci examined, only one (6-Phosphogluconate dehydrogenase, was polymorphic. No heterozygotes were detected in any population, consistent with the plant's self-compatible reproductive system. The mean number of alleles per locus at the species level was just 1.03, with only 3% of loci being polymorphic. These values are substantially lower than those found in most plant species, including other endemic plants with limited distributions.

The distribution of genetic variation shows a clear geographic pattern: populations in northwestern Svalbard predominantly contain one allele (referred to as allele 1), while populations in the southeast possess primarily a different allele (allele 2). Populations in the central "overlap" region show mixed frequencies of both alleles. This genetic structure corresponds with flower colour distribution – darker purple flower morphs are associated with allele 1, while lighter colour morphs correlate with allele 2.

Multiple factors likely contribute to this limited genetic variation, including founder effects from post-glacial colonization, genetic drift in small isolated populations, and strong natural selection in the harsh arctic environment. The plant's self-compatible reproductive system further reduces genetic exchange between individuals, leading to high homozygosity. Despite having minimal genetic diversity compared to most plants, P. dasyantha shows more variation than five other examined species in the genus Pedicularis.
