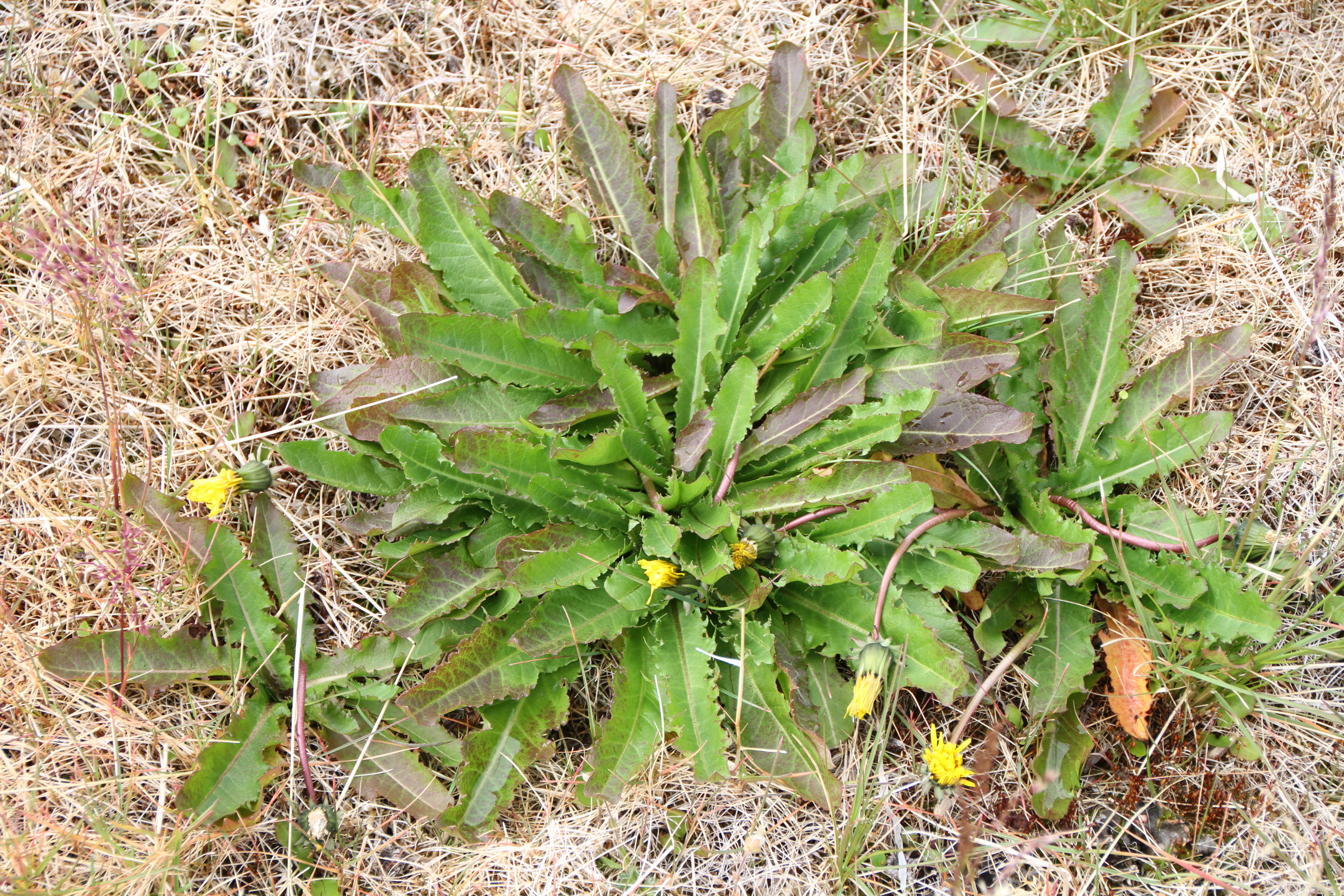

Scientific classification
- Kingdom: Plantae
- Clade: Tracheophytes
- Clade: Angiosperms
- Clade: Eudicots
- Clade: Asterids
- Order: Asterales
- Family: Asteraceae
- Genus: Taraxacum
- Species: T. brachyceras

Binomial name
- Taraxacum brachyceras Dahlst.

= Taraxacum brachyceras =

Species of flowering plant

Taraxacum brachyceras is a species of flowering plant belonging to the family Asteraceae.
