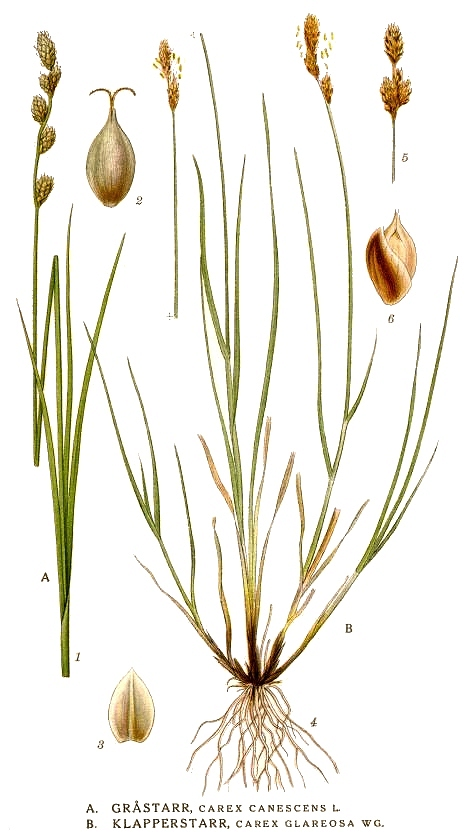

Conservation status
- Least Concern (IUCN 3.1)

Scientific classification
- Kingdom: Plantae
- Clade: Tracheophytes
- Clade: Angiosperms
- Clade: Monocots
- Clade: Commelinids
- Order: Poales
- Family: Cyperaceae
- Genus: Carex
- Species: C. glareosa

Binomial name
- Carex glareosa Schkuhr ex Wahlenb.

= Carex glareosa =

Species of grass-like plant

Carex glareosa is a species of flowering plant belonging to the family Cyperaceae.

Its native range is Northern Europe to Sakhalin, Alaska to Canada.
