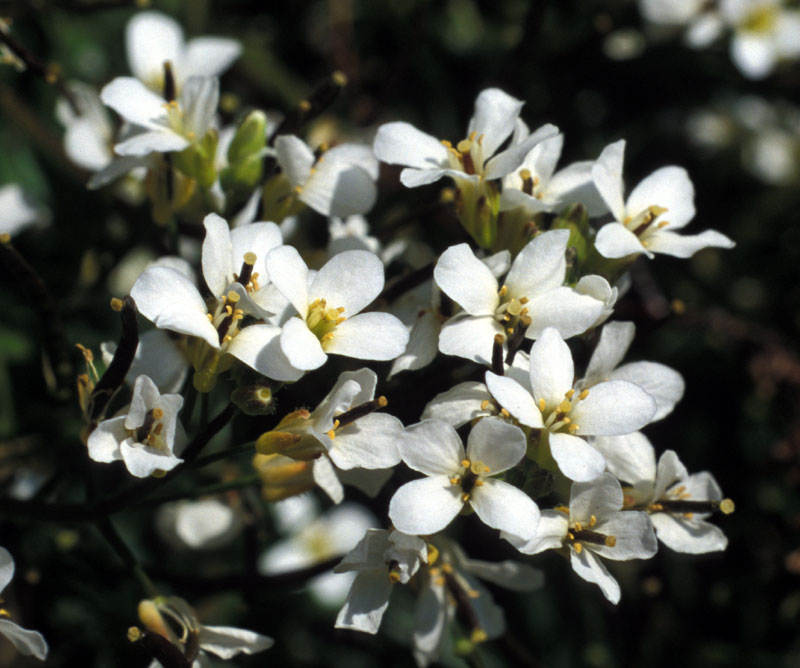

Scientific classification
- Kingdom: Plantae
- Clade: Tracheophytes
- Clade: Angiosperms
- Clade: Eudicots
- Clade: Rosids
- Order: Brassicales
- Family: Brassicaceae
- Genus: Draba
- Species: D. lactea

Binomial name
- Draba lactea Adams

= Draba lactea =

Species of flowering plant

Draba lactea, the Lapland whitlow-grass or milky whitlow-grass, is a flower common throughout the high Arctic. It stretches further south in mountainous areas of Norway, Montana, Canada, and Greenland.

The plant is 2–5 cm tall, and caespitose. The flower stems are glabrous. The leaves have stellate hairs on the surface and simple hairs at the margins. The flowers are pure white, and there are many flowers on each stem. Flowers bloom June to August.

Draba species are found on dry as well as moist localities such as wet meadows, fields and prairies. Most of the species have a circumpolar distribution, but there is considerable variation within this group.
