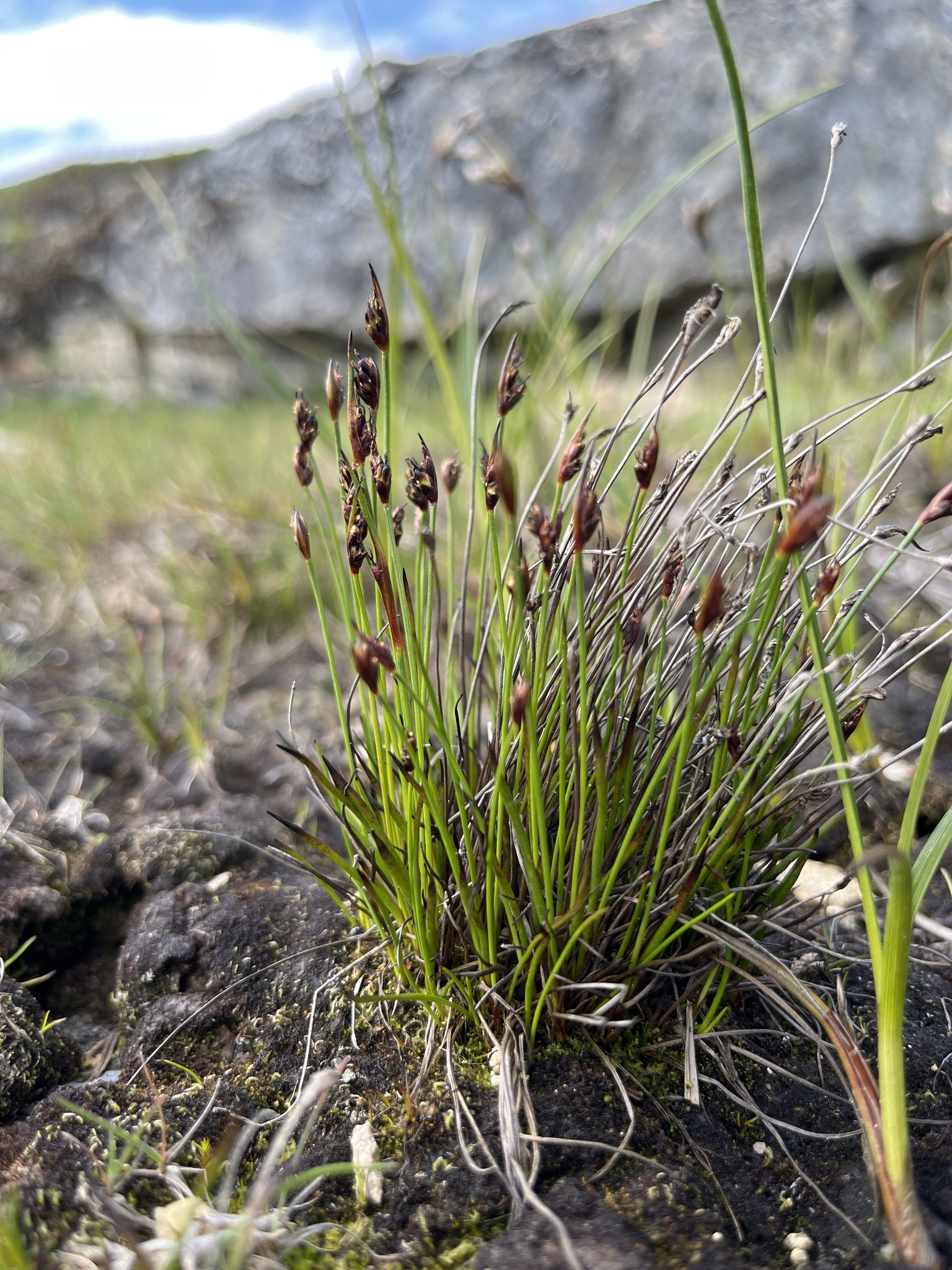

Scientific classification
- Kingdom: Plantae
- Clade: Embryophytes
- Clade: Tracheophytes
- Clade: Spermatophytes
- Clade: Angiosperms
- Clade: Monocots
- Clade: Commelinids
- Order: Poales
- Family: Juncaceae
- Genus: Juncus
- Species: J. biglumis

Binomial name
- Juncus biglumis L.

Synonyms
- Juncus biglumis var. ajonskensis Novikov

= Juncus biglumis =

Species of flowering plant

Juncus biglumis, called the two-flowered rush, is a species of flowering plant in the family Juncaceae, native to the subarctic and subalpine Northern Hemisphere. It has three divergent genetic lineages that may represent cryptic species.
