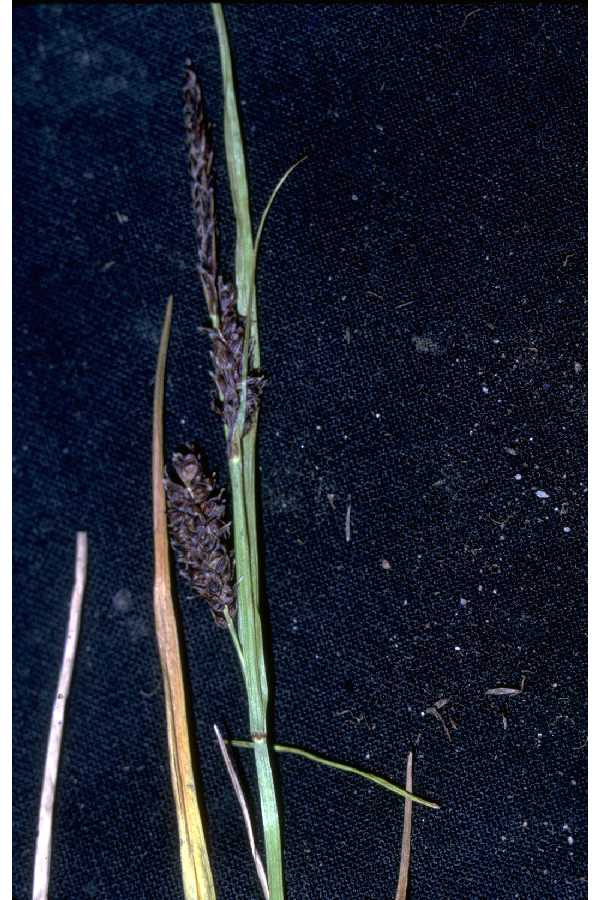

Conservation status
- Secure (NatureServe)

Scientific classification
- Kingdom: Plantae
- Clade: Tracheophytes
- Clade: Angiosperms
- Clade: Monocots
- Clade: Commelinids
- Order: Poales
- Family: Cyperaceae
- Genus: Carex
- Species: C. saxatilis

Binomial name
- Carex saxatilis L.

= Carex saxatilis =

Species of grass-like plant

Carex saxatilis is a species of sedge known by the common names rock sedge and russet sedge.

== Distribution ==
It has a circumboreal distribution, occurring throughout the northern latitudes of the Northern Hemisphere. It occurs in Alaska, throughout most all of Canada to Greenland and in Eurasia. In North America it occurs at high elevations as far south as Utah and Colorado.

== Description ==
This sedge is variable in appearance. In general, it forms a tuft of grasslike stems and leaves up to 80 or 90 centimeters tall. The inflorescence has staminate spikes above spikes of pistillate flowers.

== Ecology ==
This sedge is a dominant or codominant species in several types of wetlands among other sedges. In more southerly regions it occurs near streams and lakes. It may not compete successfully with other vegetation in southern regions, and it may be found growing in only the wettest habitat where other plants will not grow. It grows in water or saturated substrates, but sometimes in drier sites like meadows. It may be associated with bluejoint reedgrass (Calamagrostis canadensis), tufted hairgrass (Deschamsia caespitosa), variableleaf pondweed (Potamogeton gramineus), subalpine fir (Abies lasiocarpa), lodgepole pine (Pinus contorta), Engelmann spruce (Picea engelmannii), and quaking aspen (Populus tremuloides).
