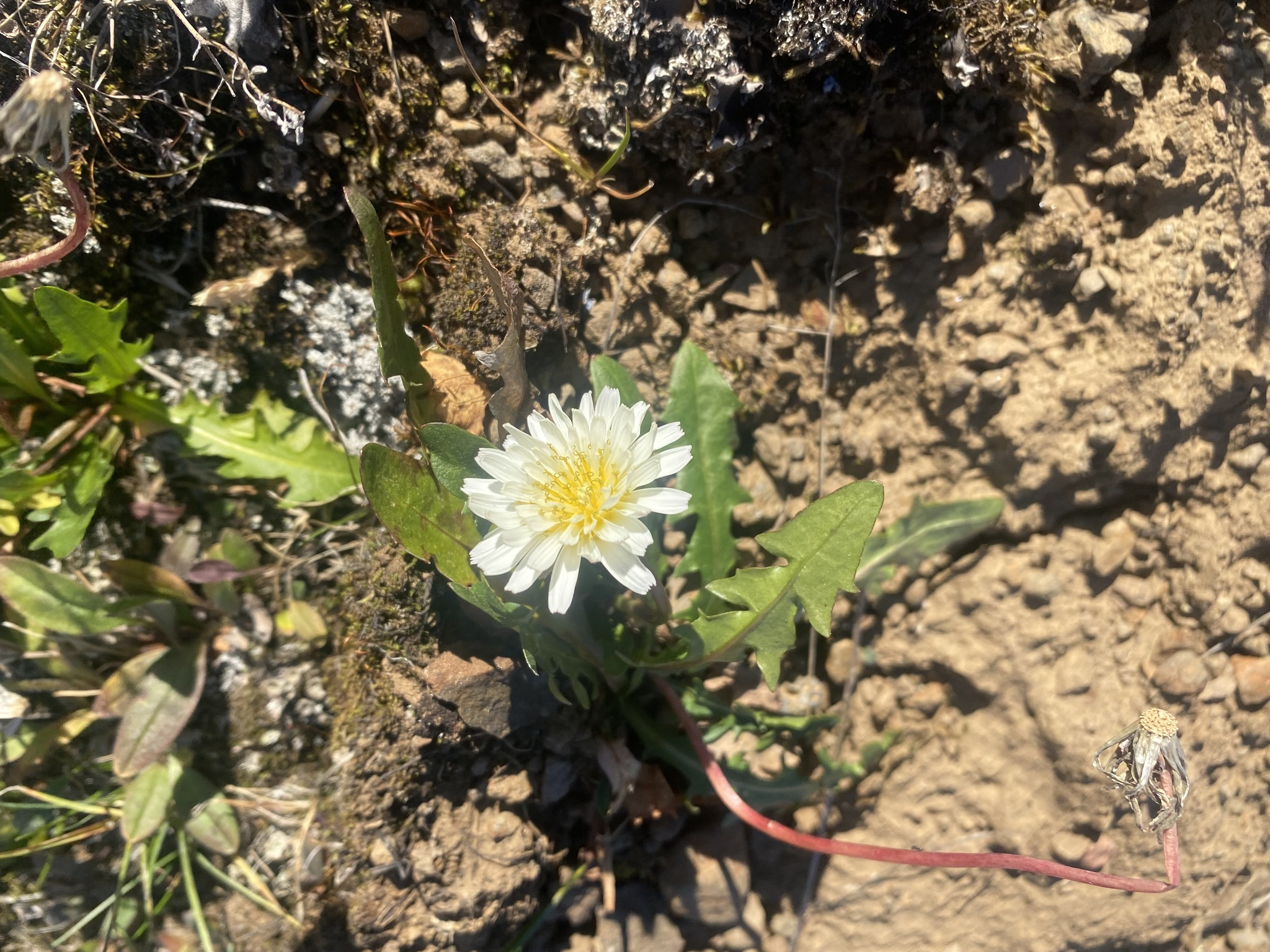

Scientific classification
- Kingdom: Plantae
- Clade: Tracheophytes
- Clade: Angiosperms
- Clade: Eudicots
- Clade: Asterids
- Order: Asterales
- Family: Asteraceae
- Genus: Taraxacum
- Species: T. arcticum

Binomial name
- Taraxacum arcticum Dahlst.

Synonyms
- Taraxacum vulgare var. arcticum Trautv.; Taraxacum arcticum f. albiflorum Dahlst.

= Taraxacum arcticum =

Species of flowering plant (arctic dandelion)

Taraxacum arcticum, the arctic dandelion, is a species of flowering plant belonging to the family Asteraceae. Its native range is Greenland, Northern Europe, Northern Asia and the Northern Russian Far East.

== Description ==
Taraxacum arcticum is a moderately long-lived perennial with a whitish taproot and a rosette of five to eight green leaves, sometimes growing solitarily and sometimes somewhat matted. The leaves are 5 to 10 cm (2 to 4 in) long and 1 to 1.5 cm (0.4 to 0.6 in) wide, and have several deep lobes and a long triangular final lobe. The inflorescences grow direct from the rosette, each with a long pinkish stem that often curves downwards and has transverse wrinkles. Each flowering stem bears a single flower head consisting of multiple florets which are bisexual; the ligules are white or creamy-white and have a purple streak on the underside. The brownish-black fruits have a number of shallow ridges and are capped by white pappi which form parachutes.

== Distribution and habitat ==
Taraxacum arcticum mainly occurs in the arctic regions of northern Europe and Asia. Its range extends from northern Greenland and Svalbard to the Chukchi Peninsula in northeastern Siberia. It grows in damp meadows and on heaths, on level or sloping land, often in positions with early snow protection or enriched with bird droppings. It grows in acid, neutral or alkaline soils.

== Reproduction ==
In general, Taraxacum sets seed whether or not the flowers have been pollinated. In some species the pollen appears ripe and yellow, and in others it is green or blackish-green, but in both types, the pollen appears to be non-functional. In the case of the boreal and arctic species, only Taraxacum holmenianum is suspected of pollination; while T. arcticum is among the species that are thought not to rely on it, but the plant flowers prolifically and produces plenty of viable seed, which is widely dispersed by the wind. There is also limited local dispersal by fragmentation of the fleshy roots.
