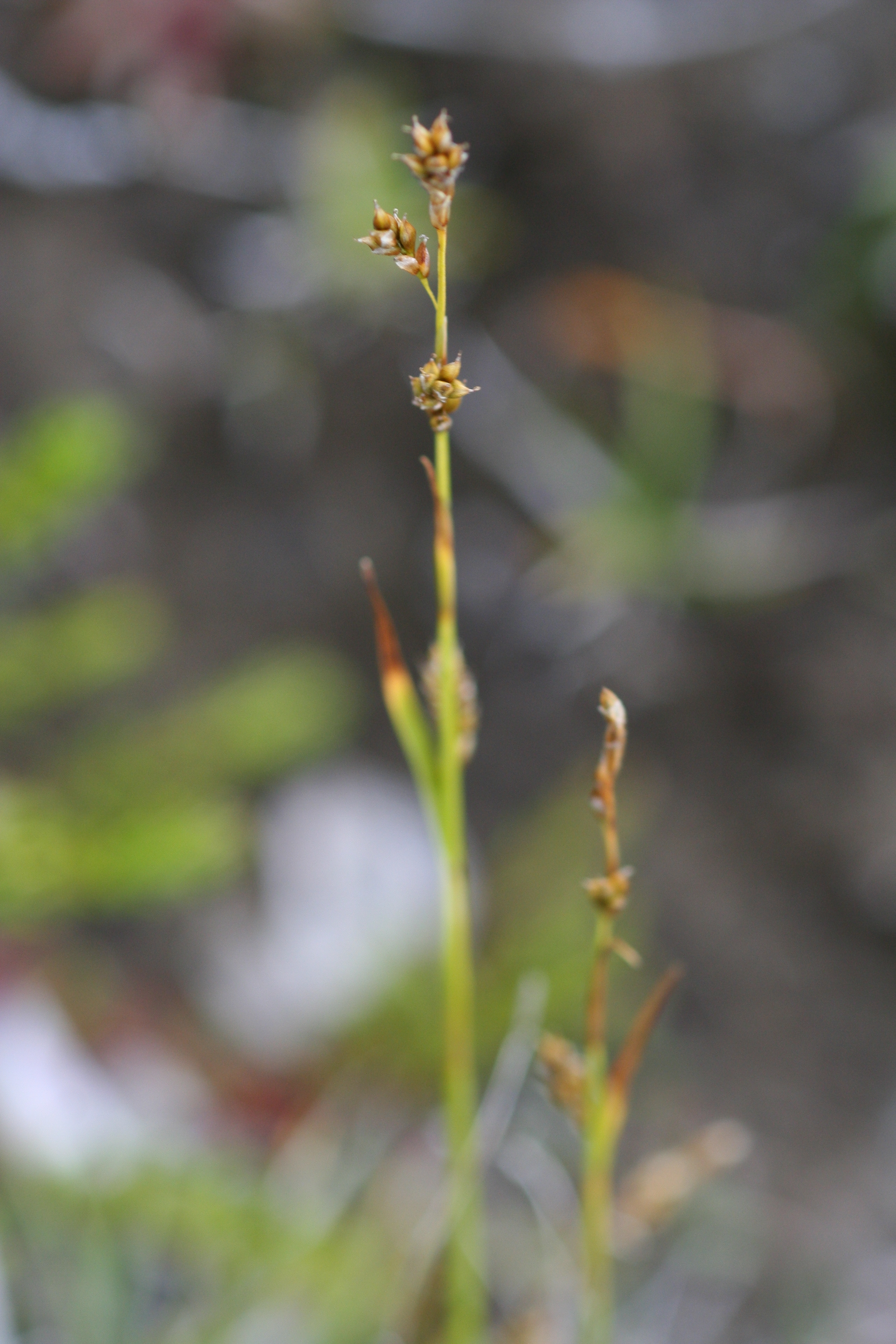
- Carex krauseorum

Scientific classification
- Kingdom: Plantae
- Clade: Tracheophytes
- Clade: Angiosperms
- Clade: Monocots
- Clade: Commelinids
- Order: Poales
- Family: Cyperaceae
- Genus: Carex
- Species: C. krausei

Binomial name
- Carex krausei Boeckeler

Synonyms
- List: Carex capillaris var. krauseorum (Boeckeler) Kranz; Carex capillaris f. krauseorum (Boeckeler) Kük.; Carex capillaris subsp. krauseorum (Boeckeler) Böcher; Carex capillaris var. nana Kük.; Carex chamissonis Meinsh.; Carex nana Cham. ex Steud.; Carex capillaris subsp. porsildiana (Polunin) Böcher; Carex capillaris var. porsildiana Polunin; Carex capillaris f. porsildiana (Polunin) Raymond

= Carex krauseorum =

Species of plant

Carex krauseorum, commonly known as Krause's sedge, is a tussock-forming species of perennial sedge in the family Cyperaceae. It is native to subarctic areas of Greenland, Alaska, northern Canada and Russia.

== Description ==
The sedge has 15 to 35 cm (5.9 to 13.8 in) long culms with flat to folded leaf blades that are 2 to 8 cm (0.79 to 3.15 in) long and 1 to 2 mm (0.039 to 0.079 in) wide. The terminal spike contains both staminate and pistillate and is 7 to 10 mm (0.28 to 0.39 in) in length and 1.3 to 1.5 mm (0.051 to 0.059 in) wide in the staminate part with lateral spikes over the top. There can be four to ten lateral spikes containing 10 to 20 flowers.

== Taxonomy ==
The species was first formally described by the botanist Johann Otto Boeckeler in 1886 as a part of the work Botanische Jahrbücher für Systematik, Pflanzengeschichte und Pflanzengeographie. There are two subspecies;

- Carex krausei subsp. krausei
- Carex krausei subsp. porsildiana (Polunin) Á.Löve, D.Löve & Raymond

== Distribution ==
It is found in sub arctic to temperate biomes in the northern hemisphere. It is found in Alaska and most parts of Canada including Yukon, Nunavut, the Northwest Territories and Quebec in the north down to British Columbia, Manitoba and Ontario in the south. It is also found in Greenland. In Russia the range extends from Chukotka Autonomous Okrug in the east through northern European Russia to Northwestern Federal District. It is also found in Svalbard further to the north.

== See also ==
- List of Carex species
