= Potentilla pulchella =

Scientific classification
- Kingdom: Plantae
- Clade: Tracheophytes
- Clade: Angiosperms
- Clade: Eudicots
- Clade: Rosids
- Order: Rosales
- Family: Rosaceae
- Genus: Potentilla
- Species: P. pulchella

Binomial name
- Potentilla pulchella R.Br.

Species of flowering plant

Potentilla pulchella is a species of flowering plant belonging to the family Rosaceae.

It is native to Subarctic to Central and Eastern Canada.
