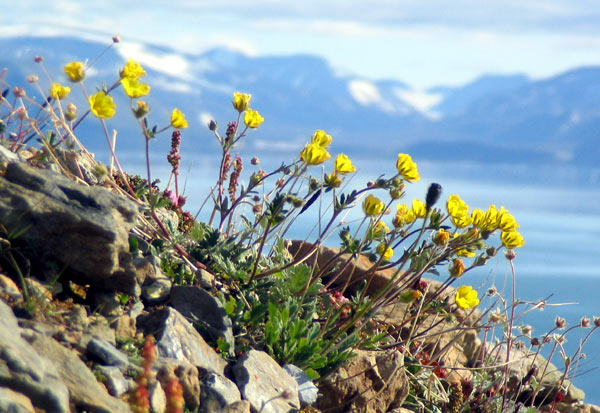

Scientific classification
- Kingdom: Plantae
- Clade: Tracheophytes
- Clade: Angiosperms
- Clade: Eudicots
- Clade: Rosids
- Order: Rosales
- Family: Rosaceae
- Genus: Potentilla
- Species: P. chamissonis

Binomial name
- Potentilla chamissonis Hult.

= Potentilla chamissonis =

Species of flowering plant

Potentilla chamissonis, the bluff cinquefoil, is distributed across Svalbard, northern Norway, Greenland and the eastern Arctic of Canada. It grows on ledges on steep slopes, and in crevices.

== Description ==
It is a loosely tufted plant growing from a stout stem base, reaching to 10–25 cm tall. The basal leaves are 3- (rarely 5-) foliate, hairy above, and densely tomentose beneath, the petioles and stems with long, straight hairs. The inflorescence is branched, bearing several fairly large flowers. The flowers have five petals, pale yellow, inversely heart-shaped, longer than sepals.
