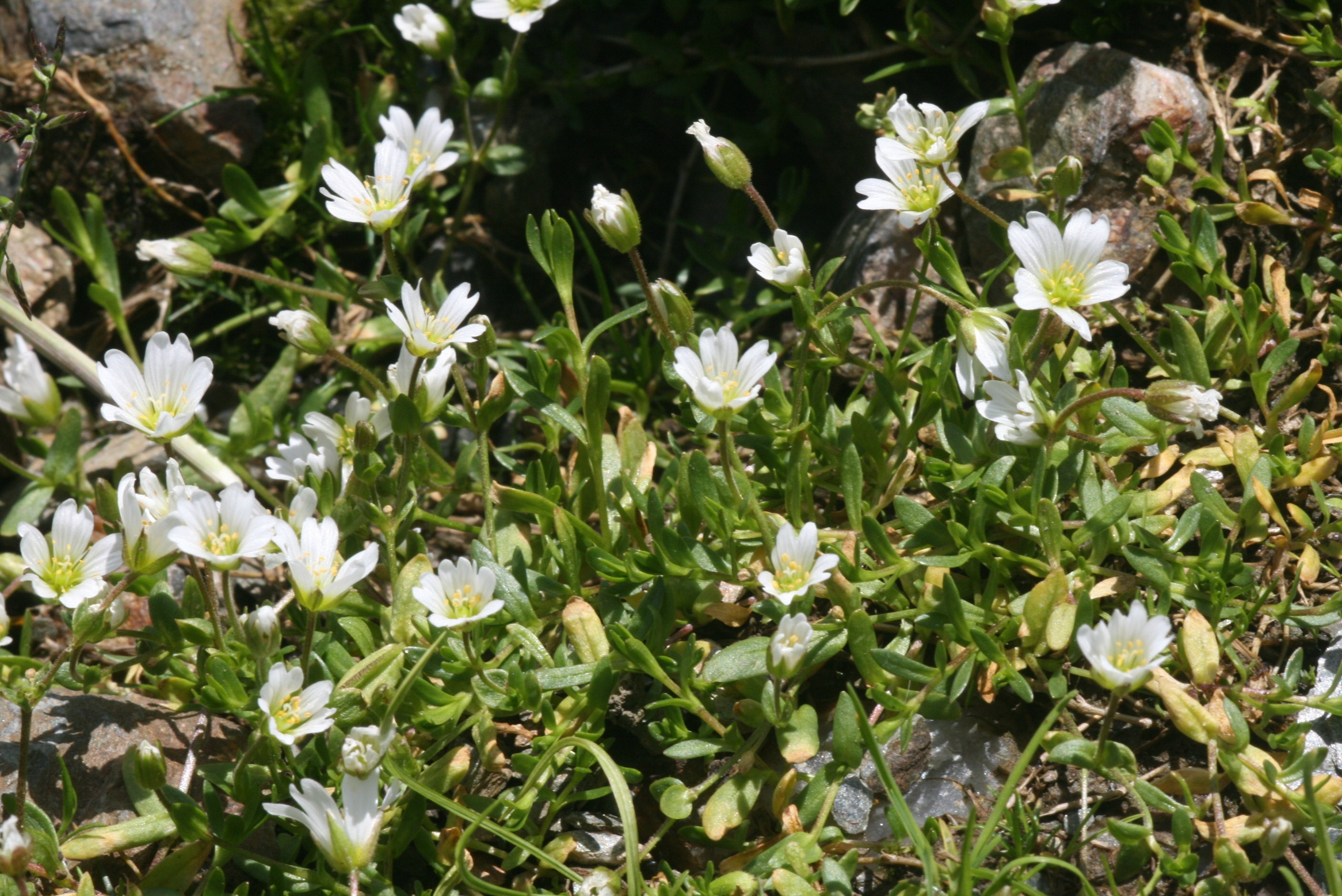
- Cerastium cerastoides

Scientific classification
- Kingdom: Plantae
- Clade: Tracheophytes
- Clade: Angiosperms
- Clade: Eudicots
- Order: Caryophyllales
- Family: Caryophyllaceae
- Genus: Dichodon (Bartl. ex Rchb.) Rchb. (1841)

Species
- 7; see text

Synonyms
- Provancheria B.Boivin (1966), nom. superfl.; Provencheria B.Boivin (1966)

= Dichodon (plant) =

Genus of flowering plants

Dichodon is a genus of flowering plants in the carnation family, Caryophyllaceae. It includes seven species native to temperate and boreal Eurasia and Morocco, Greenland, and eastern Canada.

== Species ==
Seven species are accepted.

- Dichodon alborzensis Arabi & Zarre
- Dichodon cerastoides (L.) Rchb.
- Dichodon kotschyi (Boiss.) Ikonn.
- Dichodon persicum (Boiss.) Ikonn.
- Dichodon scaturiginellum (Rech.f.) Assadi
- Dichodon tenuifolium Poursakhi, Assadi & F.Ghahrem.
- Dichodon viscidum (M.Bieb.) Holub
