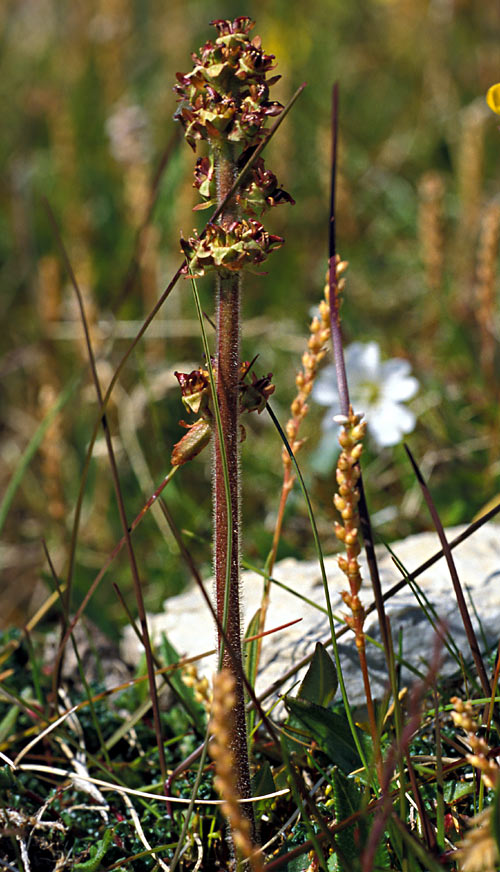

Scientific classification
- Kingdom: Plantae
- Clade: Tracheophytes
- Clade: Angiosperms
- Clade: Eudicots
- Order: Saxifragales
- Family: Saxifragaceae
- Genus: Micranthes
- Species: M. hieraciifolia

Binomial name
- Micranthes hieraciifolia (Waldst. & Kit. ex. Willd.) Haworth

= Micranthes hieraciifolia =

Species of flowering plant

Micranthes hieraciifolia (common names: hawkweed-leaved saxifrage, hawkweed-leaf saxifrage, stiff stem saxifrage or stiff-stemmed saxifrage) is a species of flowering plants. It is native to Europe, North America and temperate Asia, being distributed throughout the high Arctic and some alpine areas like Norway and the Carpathian Mountains, with a few isolated populations in the Central Eastern Alps of Austria and the Massif Central of France. It is generally uncommon.

It grows to a height of 10–20 cm. The leaves are oblong to rhombic, thick, and remotely toothed. The stem is single, stout and thick, and densely glandular. The flowers are produced in dense clusters, small and inconspicuous, with greenish to purplish petals.

It grows in meadows, on solifluction soil, and in places with well-developed moss.
