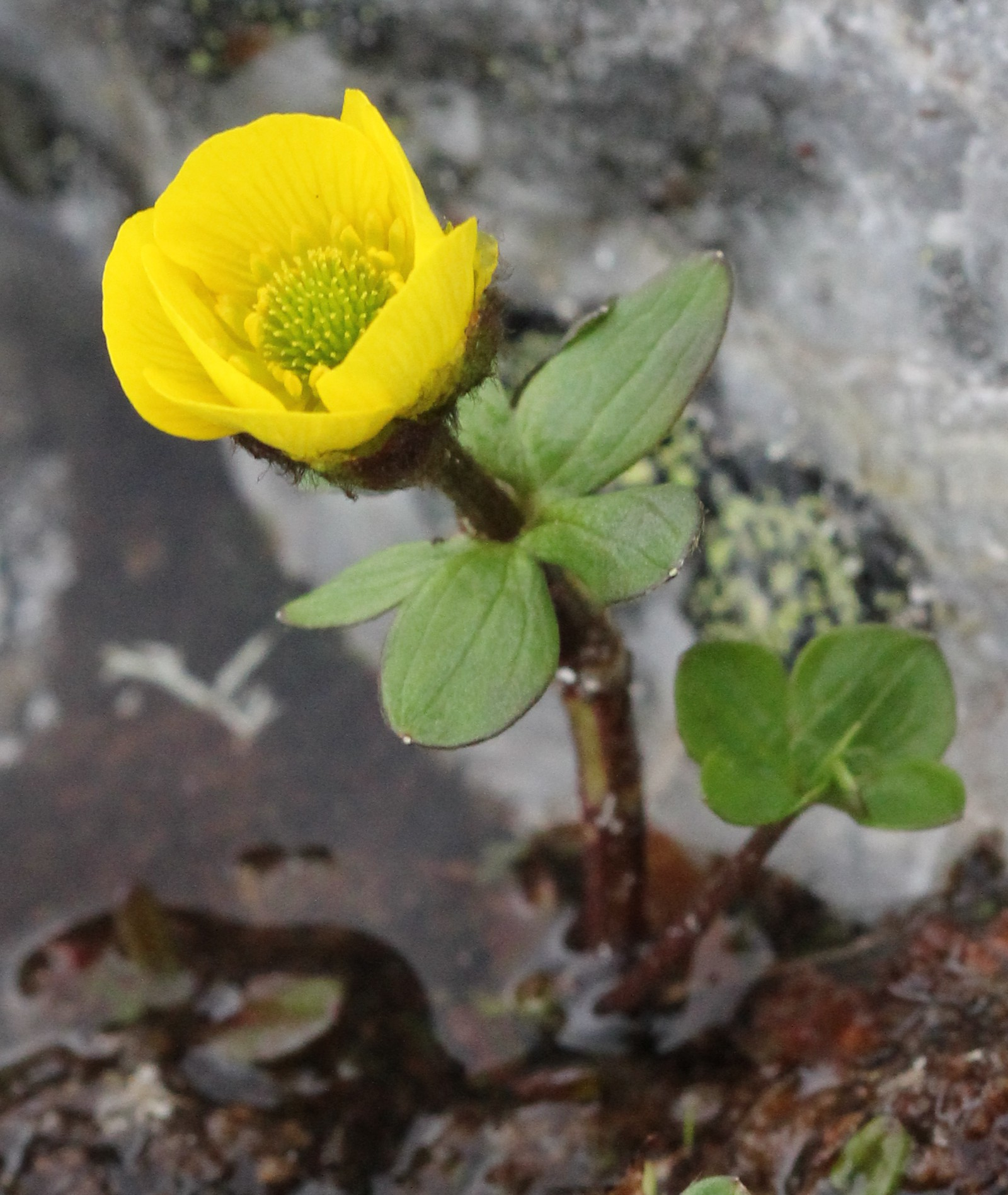

Scientific classification
- Kingdom: Plantae
- Clade: Tracheophytes
- Clade: Angiosperms
- Clade: Eudicots
- Order: Ranunculales
- Family: Ranunculaceae
- Genus: Ranunculus
- Species: R. nivalis

Binomial name
- Ranunculus nivalis L.

= Ranunculus nivalis =

Species of flowering plant

Ranunculus nivalis, the snow buttercup, is a species of plant in the family Ranunculaceae. It is a perennial herb that grows up to 9 in (23 cm). It grows in wet alpine meadows, cliffs and streamsides. It displays prevalent heliotropism, thus gaining an advantage in its harsh, cold environment through capturing more solar energy by following the sun.
