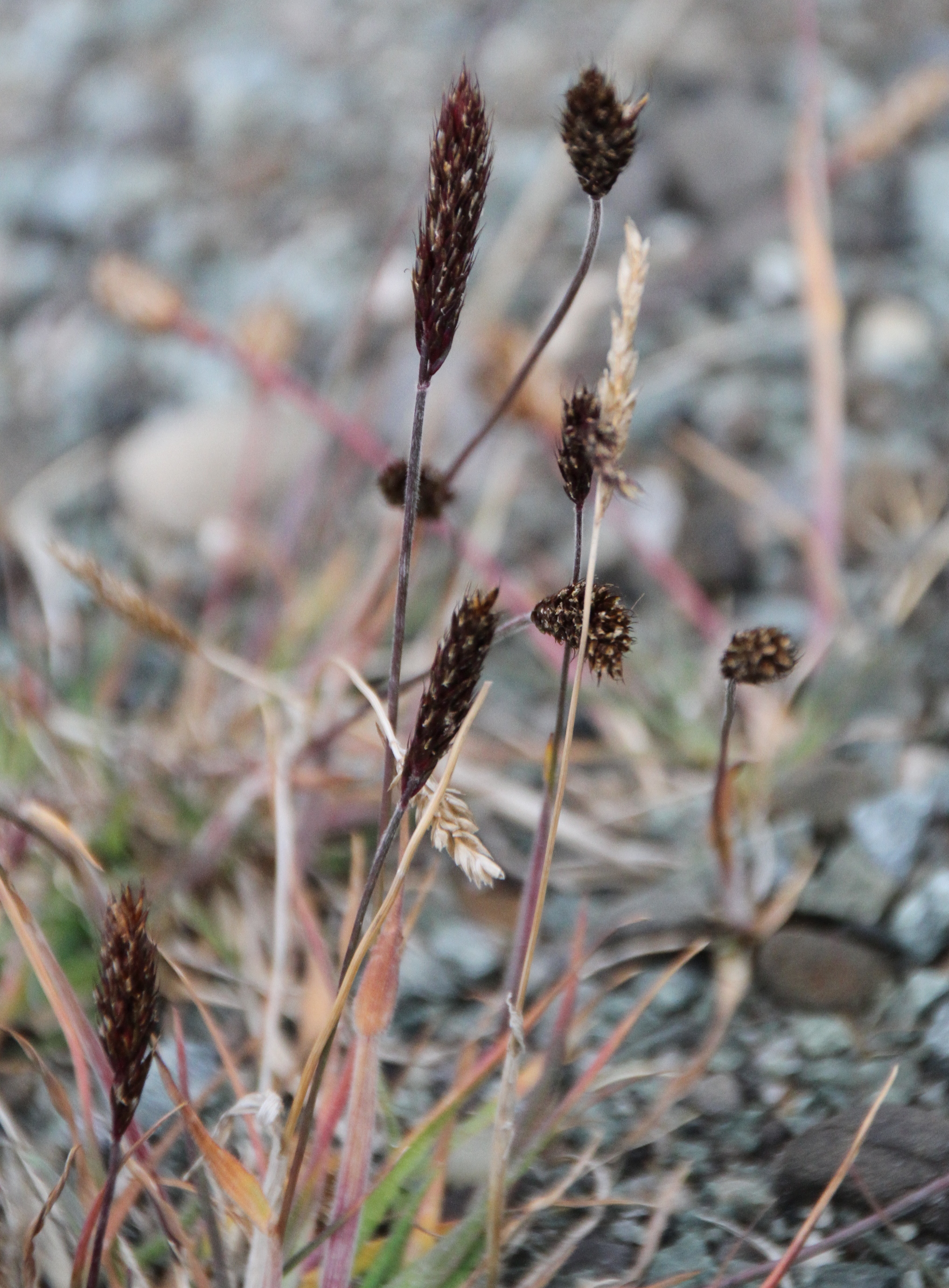
- Near Longyearbyen on Svalbard

Scientific classification
- Kingdom: Plantae
- Clade: Embryophytes
- Clade: Tracheophytes
- Clade: Spermatophytes
- Clade: Angiosperms
- Clade: Monocots
- Clade: Commelinids
- Order: Poales
- Family: Cyperaceae
- Genus: Carex
- Species: C. fuliginosa

Binomial name
- Carex fuliginosa Schkuhr

Synonyms
- List: Carex frigida Wahlenb.; Carex fuliginosa subsp. misandra (R.Br.) Nyman; Carex fuliginosa var. misandra (R.Br.) O.Lang; Carex misandra R.Br.; Carex misandra f. flavida Fernald; Carex misandra f. ochrolochin Ostenf.

= Carex fuliginosa =

Species of grass-like plant

Carex fuliginosa, the short-leaved sedge, is a species of flowering plant in the family Cyperaceae, with a circumpolar distribution, and found in mountains further south; such as the eastern Alps, the Carpathians and the Rockies. It is wind-pollinated.
