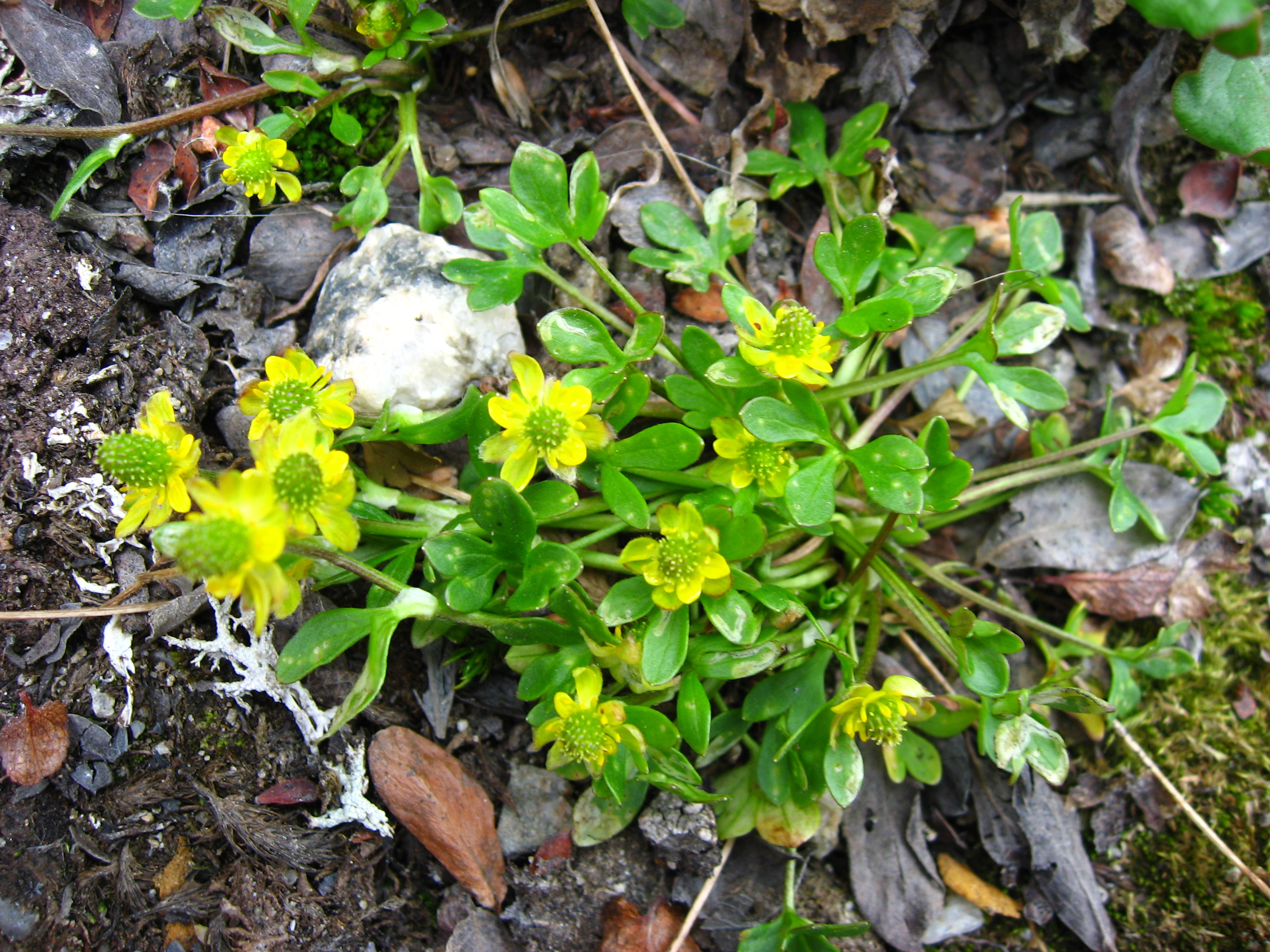

Scientific classification
- Kingdom: Plantae
- Clade: Tracheophytes
- Clade: Angiosperms
- Clade: Eudicots
- Order: Ranunculales
- Family: Ranunculaceae
- Genus: Ranunculus
- Species: R. hyperboreus

Binomial name
- Ranunculus hyperboreus Rottb.

= Ranunculus hyperboreus =

Species of flowering plant

Ranunculus hyperboreus is a species of flowering plant belonging to the family Ranunculaceae.

It is native to Subarctic and Subalpine Northern Hemisphere.
