= × Arctodupontia =

Scientific classification
- Kingdom: Plantae
- Clade: Tracheophytes
- Clade: Angiosperms
- Clade: Monocots
- Clade: Commelinids
- Order: Poales
- Family: Poaceae
- Subfamily: Pooideae
- Supertribe: Poodae
- Tribe: Poeae
- Genus: × Arctodupontia; Tzvelev
- Species: × A. scleroclada

Binomial name
- × Arctodupontia scleroclada (Rupr.) Tzvelev

Synonyms
- Dupontia × scleroclada (Rupr.) Rupr.; Poa × scleroclada Rupr.

Genus of grasses

× Arctodupontia is a nothogenus of Arctic and Subarctic plants in the grass family. The only known nothospecies is × Arctodupontia scleroclada, found in the colder regions of Eurasia and North America (Nunavut, Svalbard, Magadan, northern European Russia). It is believed to have originated as a hybrid of two other arctic grasses: Arctophila fulva × Dupontia fisheri.
