= Festuca baffinensis =

Scientific classification
- Kingdom: Plantae
- Clade: Tracheophytes
- Clade: Angiosperms
- Clade: Monocots
- Clade: Commelinids
- Order: Poales
- Family: Poaceae
- Subfamily: Pooideae
- Genus: Festuca
- Species: F. baffinensis

Binomial name
- Festuca baffinensis Nicholas Polunin

Synonyms
- Festuca brachyphylla var. pubiculmis (St.-Yves) Litard. in Candollea 10: 108 (1945); Festuca brevifolia subvar. pubiculmis St.-Yves in Candollea 2: 254 (1925)

Species of grass

Festuca baffinensis, also called the Baffin Island fescue, is a species of grass in the Poaceae family. The name was published in Bulletin of the National Museum of Canada in 1940. The specific name 'baffinensis' was named after Baffin Island in Canada. This species can be found natively from Subarctic Northern Hemisphere to W. Central U.S.A. It was first described in 1940 by Nicholas Polunin.

== Characteristics ==
Festuca baffinensis have culms that are 5-25 centimeters long and are densely pubescent or pilose near the inflorense. The sheaths are shut for about half their length.

== Habitat ==
Festuca baffinensis is a perennial plant and mainly grows in temperate biomes or volcanic areas.
