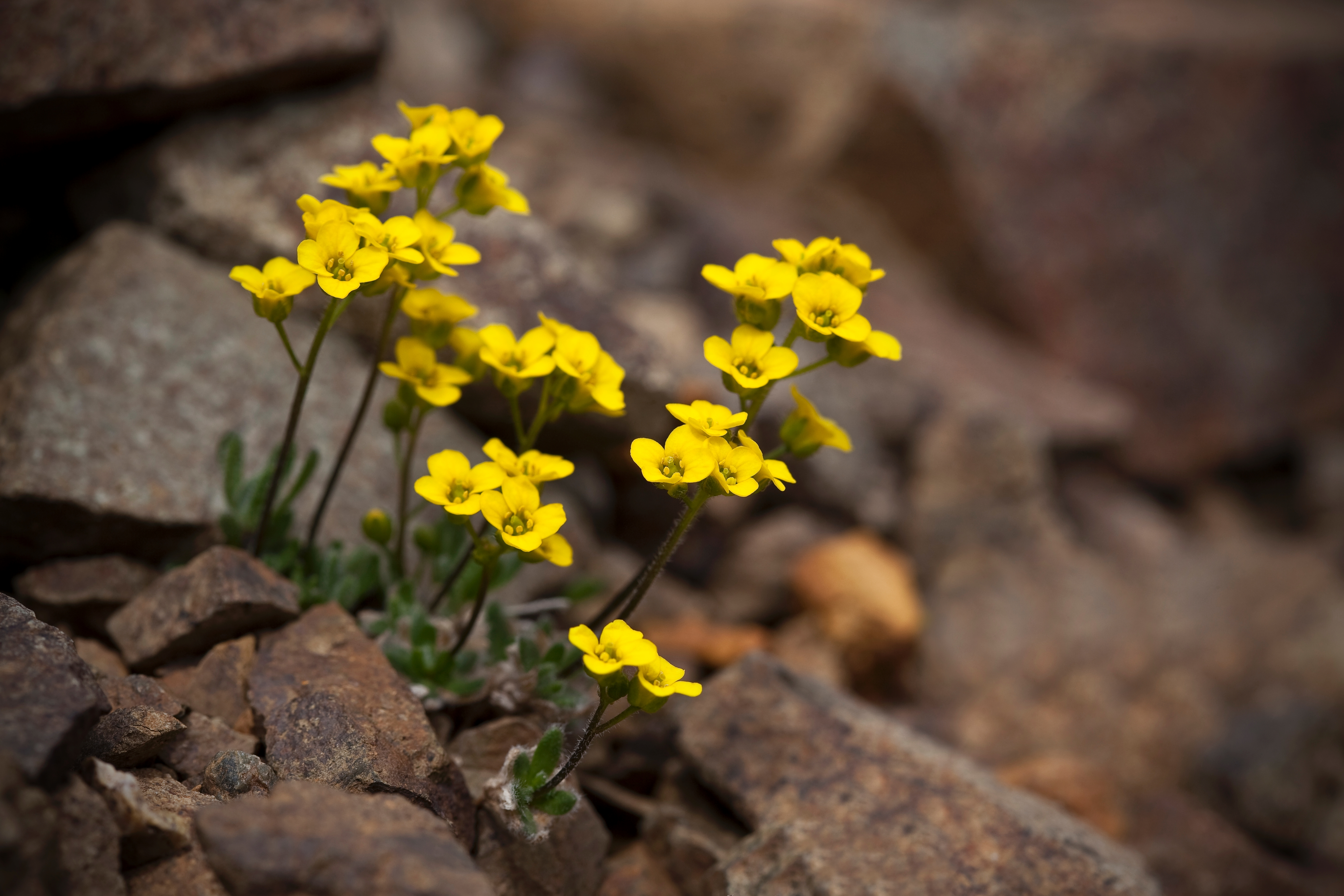
- At the Denali National Park and Preserve
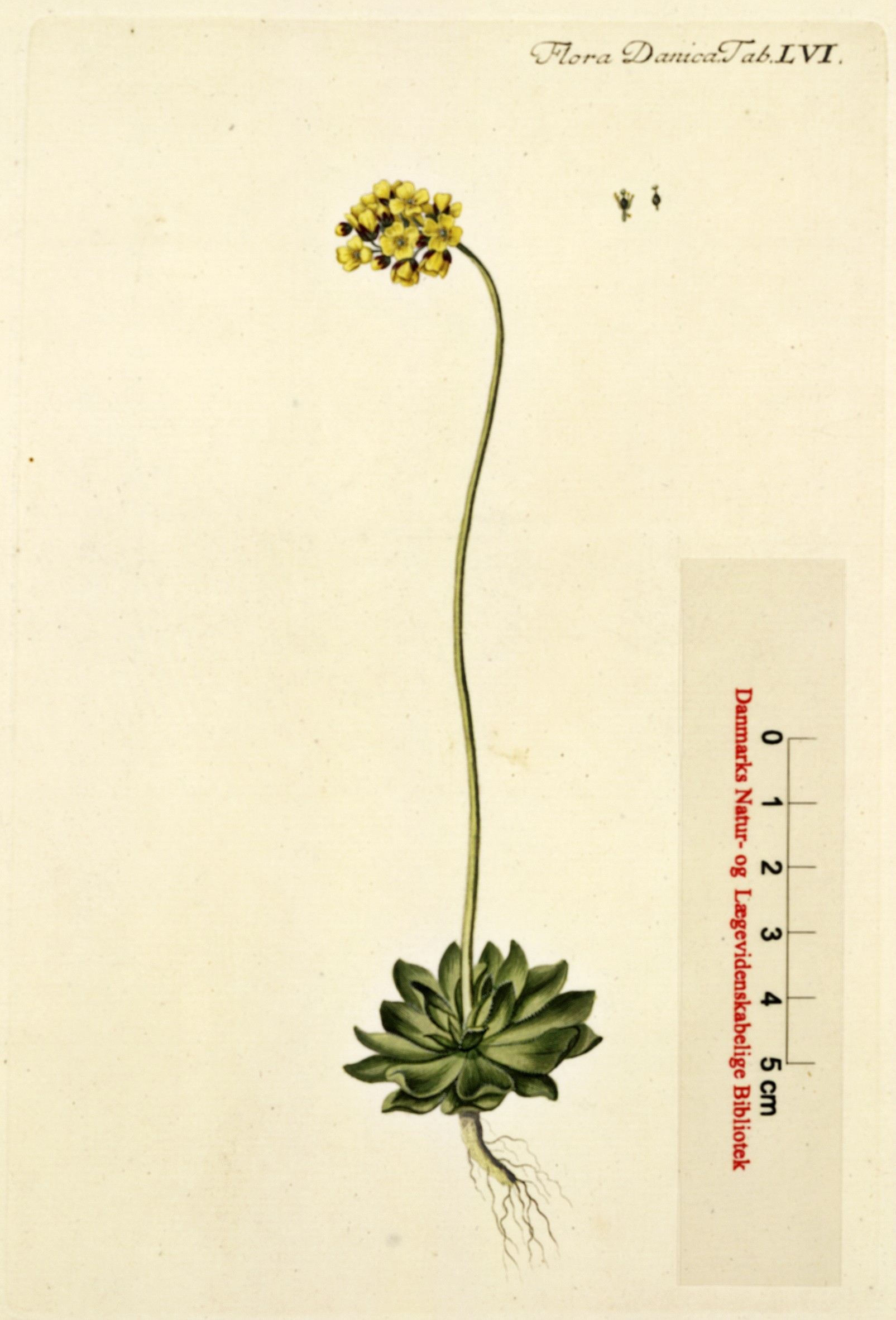
- Botanical illustration

Conservation status
- Apparently Secure (NatureServe)

Scientific classification
- Kingdom: Plantae
- Clade: Tracheophytes
- Clade: Angiosperms
- Clade: Eudicots
- Clade: Rosids
- Order: Brassicales
- Family: Brassicaceae
- Genus: Draba
- Species: D. alpina

Binomial name
- Draba alpina L.

Synonyms
- List: Draba × algida var. breviscapa Hook.; Draba alpina f. breviscapa (Hook.) O.E.Schulz; Draba alpina var. corymbosa Durand; Draba alpina var. genuina Pohle; Draba alpina var. glabrata Lindblom; Draba alpina var. hebecarpa Lindblom; Draba alpina var. hydeana B.Boivin; Draba alpina var. inflatisiliqua Polunin; Draba alpina var. intermedia Hook.; Draba alpina var. legitima Lindblom; Draba alpina f. longipedunculata Pohle; Draba alpina var. major Hook.; Draba alpina var. nana Hook.; Draba alpina var. pohlei O.E.Schulz; Draba gelida Turcz.; Draba reuteri Boiss. & A.Huet; Draba wahlenbergii var. gelida (Turcz.) Regel

= Draba alpina =

Species of plant

Draba alpina, the alpine whitlow-grass (a name it shares with Draba densifolia) or alpine draba, is a species of flowering plant in the family Brassicaceae. It is native to the Arctic and Subarctic regions; Iceland, Svalbard, Scandinavia, northern European Russia, Siberia, the northern Russian Far East, Kazakhstan, Mongolia, Alaska, Nunavut, Manitoba, Ontario, Quebec, Labrador, and Greenland. In spite of its scientific and vernacular names, it is not found in the Alps. A perennial subshrub reaching 10 in (25 cm), it prefers alkaline soils.
