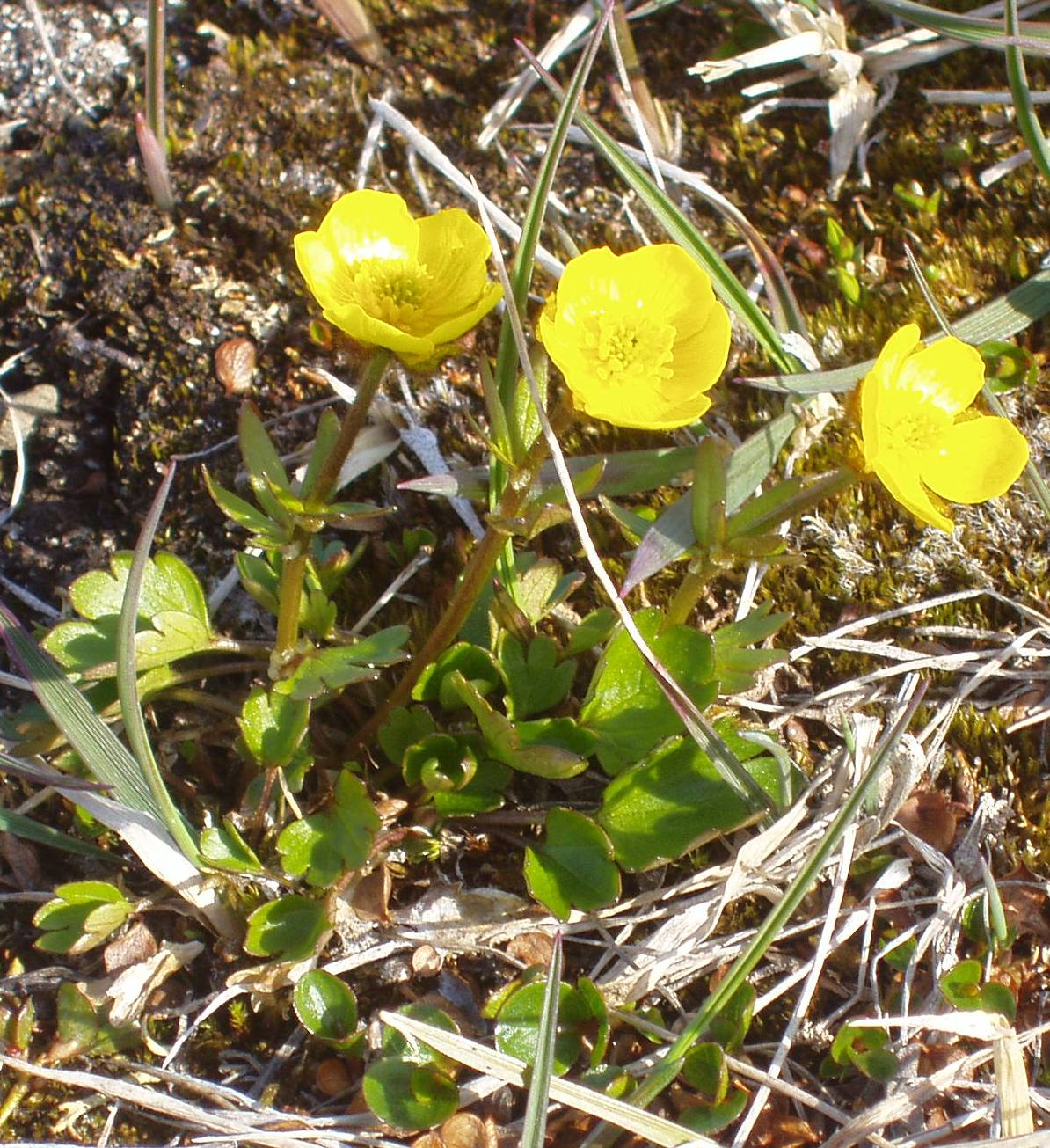

Scientific classification
- Kingdom: Plantae
- Clade: Tracheophytes
- Clade: Angiosperms
- Clade: Eudicots
- Order: Ranunculales
- Family: Ranunculaceae
- Genus: Ranunculus
- Species: R. sulphureus

Binomial name
- Ranunculus sulphureus Sol.

= Ranunculus sulphureus =

Species of flowering plant

Ranunculus sulphureus is a species of flowering plant belonging to the family Ranunculaceae.

It is native to the Subarctic.
