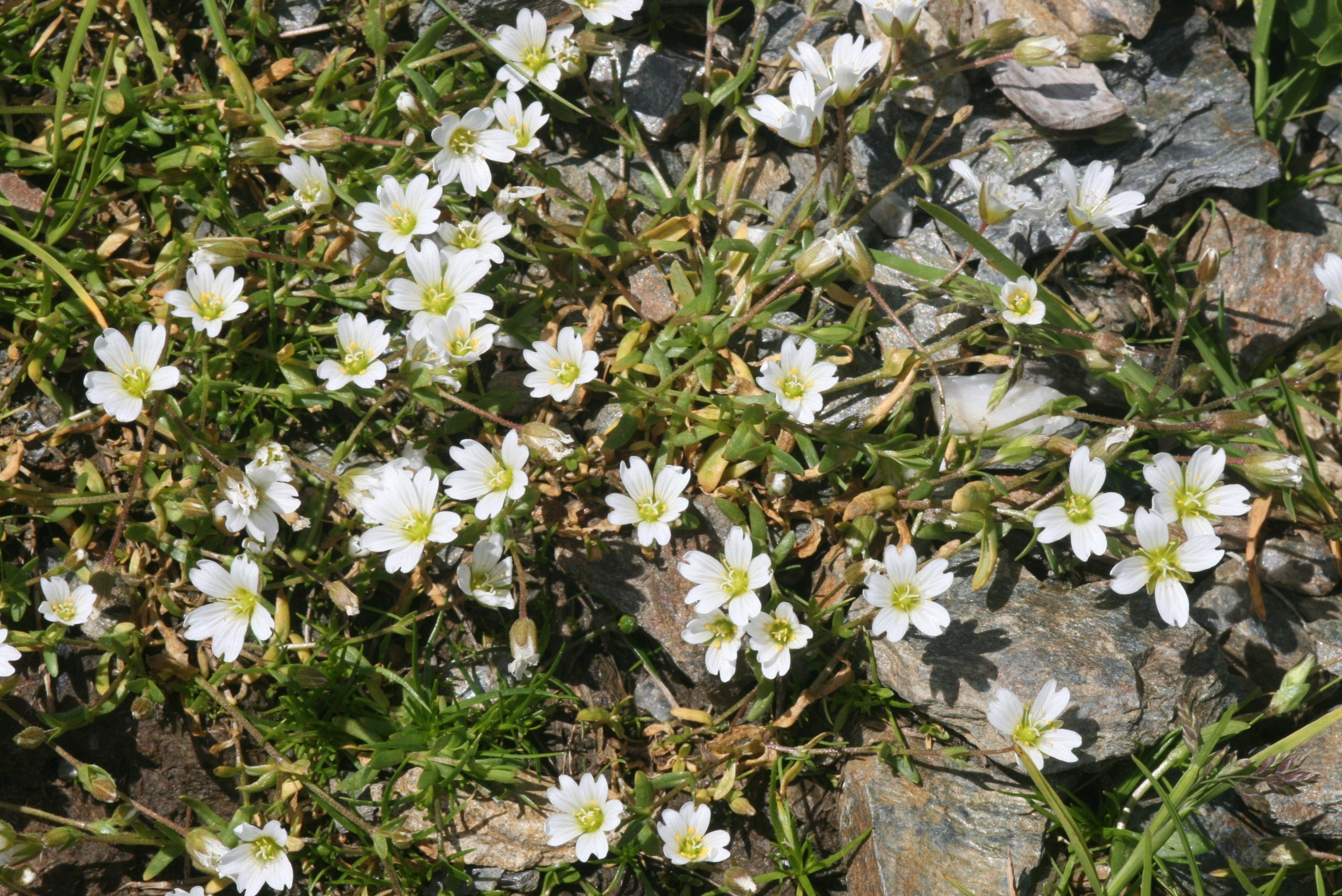

Scientific classification
- Kingdom: Plantae
- Clade: Embryophytes
- Clade: Tracheophytes
- Clade: Angiosperms
- Clade: Eudicots
- Order: Caryophyllales
- Family: Caryophyllaceae
- Genus: Dichodon
- Species: D. cerastoides

Binomial name
- Dichodon cerastoides (L.) Britton

Synonyms
- List: Alsine multicaulis (Willd.) E.H.L.Krause; Arenaria argaea (Boiss. & Balansa) Shinners; Arenaria trigyna (Vill.) Shinners; Centunculus alpinus Scop.; Cerastium argaeum Boiss. & Balansa; Cerastium cerastoides (L.) Britton; Cerastium elegans Fisch. ex Ser.; Cerastium lagascanum C.Vicioso; Cerastium lapponicum Crantz; Cerastium nivale D.Don ex Nyman; Cerastium obtusifolium Kar. & Kir.; Cerastium refractum All.; Cerastium rupestre Fisch. ex Ser.; Cerastium stellaria Vest; Cerastium stellarioides Hartm.; Cerastium stellarioides Hegetschw.; Cerastium trigynum Vill.; Dichodon argaeum (Boiss. & Balansa) Ikonn.; Provencheria cerastoides (L.) B.Boivin; Stellaria caespitosa Dufour; Stellaria cerastoides L.; Stellaria elegans Ser.; Stellaria glareosa Turcz. ex Steud.; Stellaria multicaulis Willd.; Stellaria radicans Lapeyr.

= Dichodon cerastoides =

Species of flowering plant in the pink family

Dichodon cerastoides, commonly known as the mountain chickweed or starwort mouse-ear, is a species of flowering plant in the pink family Caryophyllaceae. It is found in the mountains of Europe.
