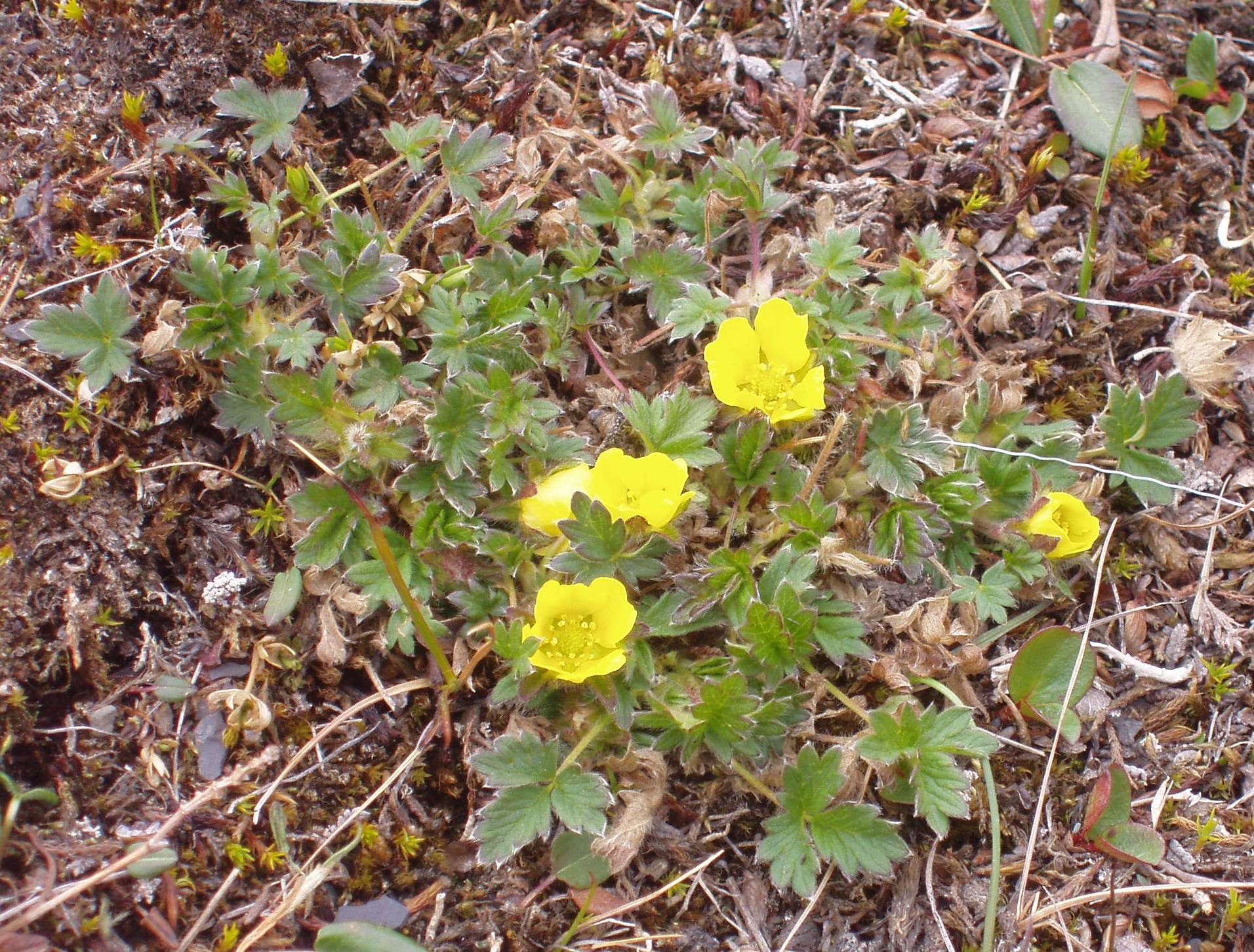

Scientific classification
- Kingdom: Plantae
- Clade: Tracheophytes
- Clade: Angiosperms
- Clade: Eudicots
- Clade: Rosids
- Order: Rosales
- Family: Rosaceae
- Genus: Potentilla
- Species: P. hyparctica

Binomial name
- Potentilla hyparctica Malte

= Potentilla hyparctica =

Species of flowering plant

Potentilla hyparctica, commonly known as Arctic Cinquefoil, is a species of flowering plant belonging to the family Rosaceae.

Its native range is in the Subarctic of the Northern Hemisphere, northern Europe and Afghanistan to Central Asia and the Himalayas.

== Description ==
Potentilla hyparctica is a low-growing, tussocky herb growing from a stout caudex. The prostrate branches are clothed with reddish-brown, withered leaf-sheaths and terminate with a rosette of alternately arranged leaves. Each long-stalked leaf blade has three, stalked, palmately-arranged leaflets. Both the leafstalks and the upper and lower surfaces of the leaf blade bear short, dense hairs and the blades are covered with minute red and yellow glands. The leaflets are oblong or obovate with shallowly-lobed margins and several coarse teeth.

The flowers are single or form a cyme of two to three flowers with bracts. The flowers are symmetrical and have parts in fives. The floral cup has narrow, oblong bractlets nearly as long as the sepals. Both are densely clad in short white hairs and bear numerous red glands. The petals are up to 9 mm (0.4 in) long and are yellow with an orange blotch at the base. The stamens are numerous and the carpels free. The fruit is a nutlet with 20 or 30 segments. It is retained in the cup-shaped calyx and dispersed ballistically by the wind or passing animals.

== Distribution and habitat ==
The range of Potentilla hyparctica is circumpolar in the Northern Hemisphere, predominantly in the arctic zone. Its European range includes northern Norway, including Svalbard, Finland, an isolated location in the mountains of northern Sweden and northern Russia. In Asia its range extends from Siberia and Afghanistan to Central Asia and the Himalayas. In North America its range includes Alaska, Northern Canada and Greenland. Habitat types include heaths, both dry and moist, hollows where early snows collect, vegetated slopes, damp scree slopes, river-side flats, tussocks in wetlands and areas where bird droppings accumulate. It usually grows on sand or gravel and prefers neutral or acidic soils.
