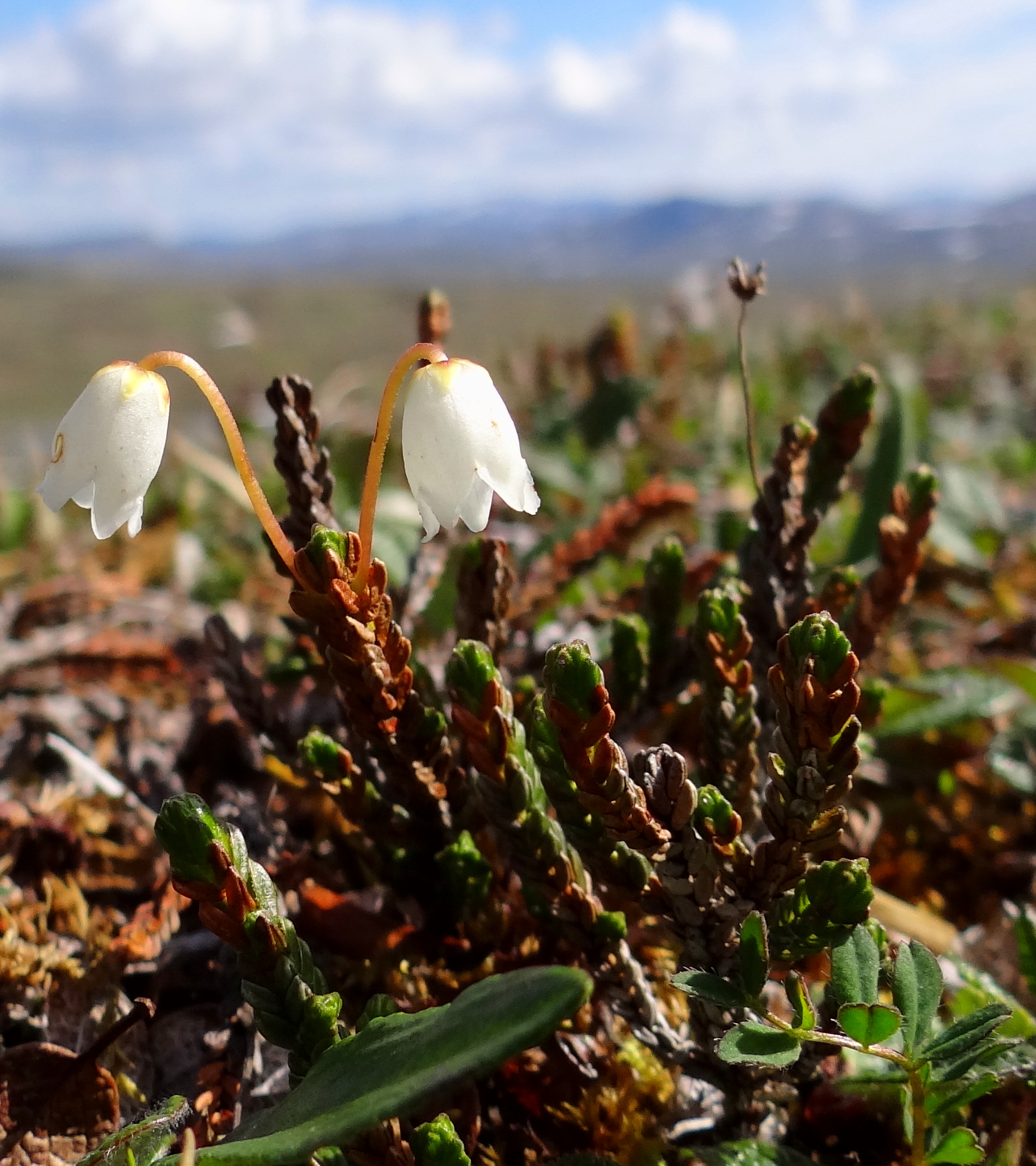

Conservation status
- Secure (NatureServe)

Scientific classification
- Kingdom: Plantae
- Clade: Tracheophytes
- Clade: Angiosperms
- Clade: Eudicots
- Clade: Asterids
- Order: Ericales
- Family: Ericaceae
- Genus: Cassiope
- Species: C. tetragona

Binomial name
- Cassiope tetragona (L.) D.Don

Subspecies
- C. tetragona subsp. tetragona autonym; C. tetragona subsp. saximontana (Small) A.E.Porsild

Synonyms
- Andromeda tetragona L.

= Cassiope tetragona =

Species of flowering plant in the heath family

Cassiope tetragona (common names include Arctic bell-heather, white Arctic mountain heather and Arctic white heather) is a 5–10 cm (2.0–3.9 in) tall low growing plant native to the high Arctic and northern Norway, where it is found widely. It is a white flowered shrub in the Ericaceae family.

== Distribution ==
Growing to 5–10 cm (2.0–3.9 in) in height, it is a strongly branched dwarf shrub. The leaves are grooved, evergreen, and scale-like in four rows. Pedicels are long and arched. The plant bears bell-shaped, solitary flowers usually with white and pink lobes and pink anthers. The flower stalks and sepals are red, but the petals may also be yellowish-white. The anthers can also be brownish-yellow and flower stalks and sepals yellowish-green.

== Habitat ==
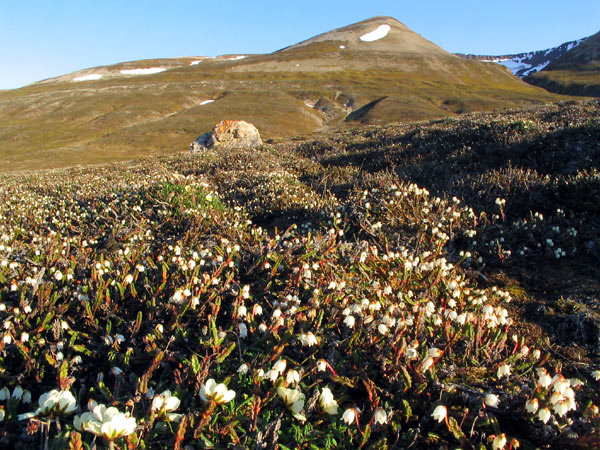
Arctic bell-heather

It grows on ridges, gravely slopes, heaths and tundra, often in abundance and forming a distinctive and unique plant community.

== Distribution ==
Cassiope tetragona is widely distributed throughout the north hemisphere.

== Uses ==
In the Canadian Arctic, indigenous peoples use the plant as fuel. Because of high resin content, it burns even when wet.

The plant can also be used in cooking. Canadian chef Louis Charest used arctic heather as a smoked herb for the 2016 Three Amigos Summit state dinner.

== See also ==
- Flora of Svalbard
