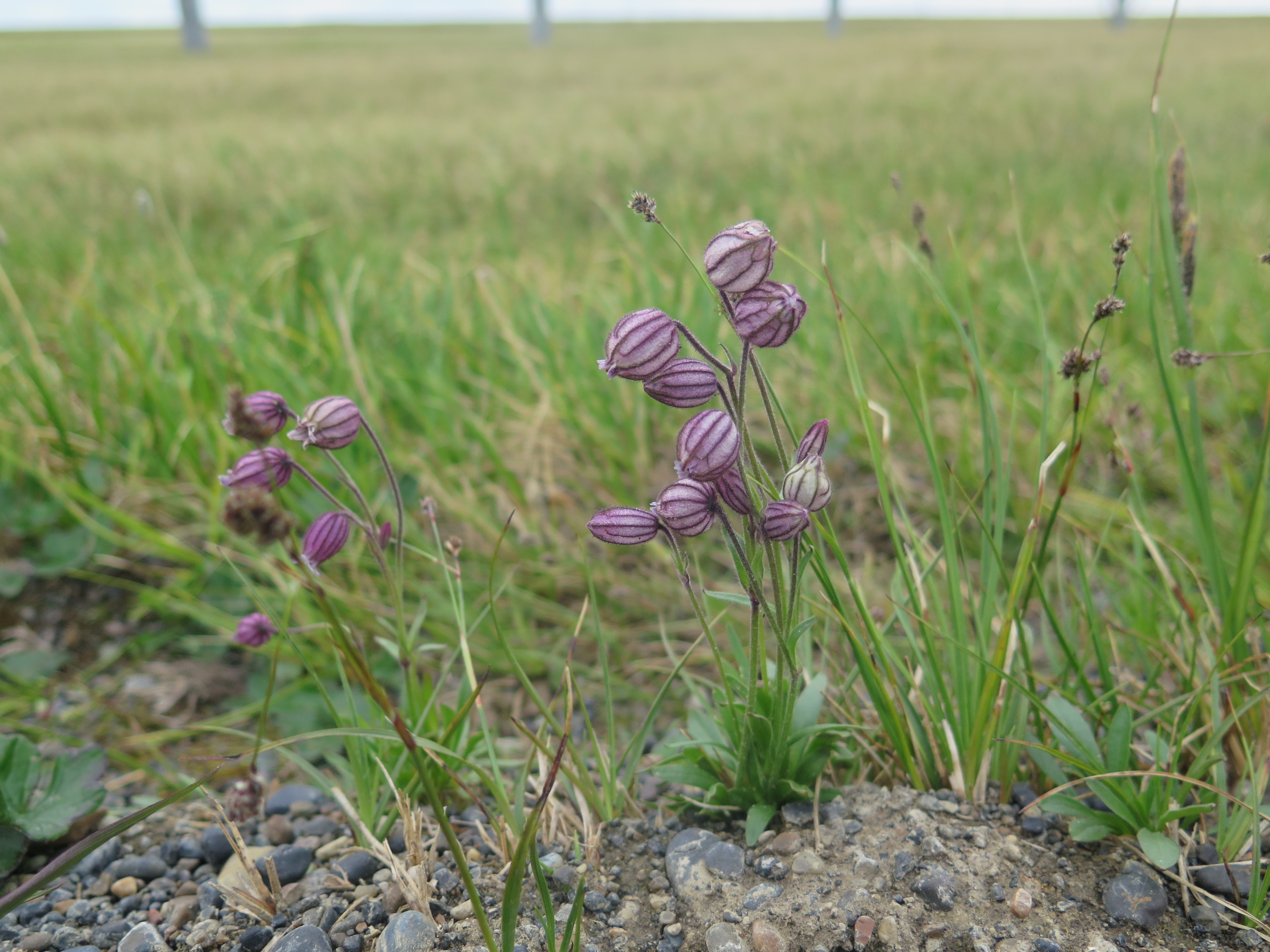
- Apetelous catchfly in Barrow, Alaska

Conservation status
- Apparently Secure (NatureServe)

Scientific classification
- Kingdom: Plantae
- Clade: Tracheophytes
- Clade: Angiosperms
- Clade: Eudicots
- Order: Caryophyllales
- Family: Caryophyllaceae
- Genus: Silene
- Species: S. uralensis

Binomial name
- Silene uralensis (Rupr.) Bocquet

Synonyms
- Gastrolychnis uralensis (Rupr.)

= Silene uralensis =

Species of flowering plant

Silene uralensis, known by the common name apetelous catchfly or nodding campion, is a perennial plant found in Greenland, northern Canada, Alaska, East Asia, and Siberia.

== Description ==
Silene uralensis is identified by having tufts of basal leaves, a thick taproot, and inflated flowers that range from white to purple in color.

There are three subspecies, including Silene uralensis subsp. uralensis, Silene uralensis subsp. ogilviensis, and Silene uralensis subsp. porsildii. Silene wahlbergella is sometimes treated synonymously with Silene uralensis.
