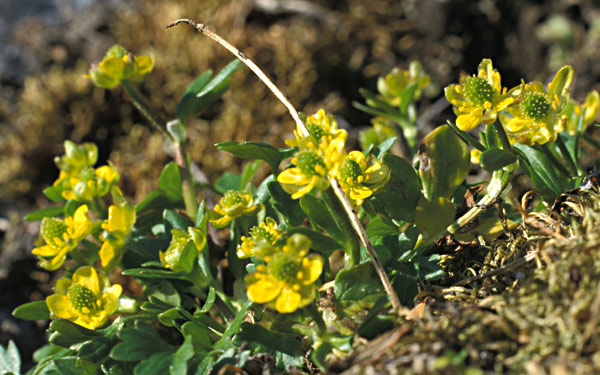

Scientific classification
- Kingdom: Plantae
- Clade: Tracheophytes
- Clade: Angiosperms
- Clade: Eudicots
- Order: Ranunculales
- Family: Ranunculaceae
- Genus: Ranunculus
- Species: R. pygmaeus

Binomial name
- Ranunculus pygmaeus Wahlenb.

= Ranunculus pygmaeus =

Species of buttercup

Ranunculus pygmaeus, the pygmy buttercup or dwarf buttercup, is a species of buttercup found throughout the Arctic, as well as in the mountains of Norway and the Rocky Mountains. A few populations also exist in the Eastern Alps and Tatra Mountains.

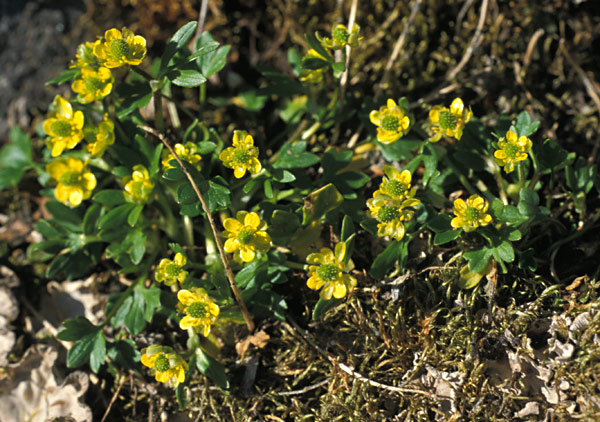
Pygmy buttercup, Ranunculus pygmaeus

It is a small plant, prostrate-ascending, 1–5 cm tall. The stems are single-flowered, with the basal leaves numerous. The leaves are deeply cleft into 3-5 lobes. The flowers are 5–6 mm in diameter, with five pale yellow petals, and five hairy sepals. After flowering, the stems stretch considerably, reaching far above the basal leaves. It grows in snowbeds, moss carpets and other moist localities.
