= Eutrema edwardsii =

Conservation status
- Least Concern (IUCN 3.1)

Scientific classification
- Kingdom: Plantae
- Clade: Tracheophytes
- Clade: Angiosperms
- Clade: Eudicots
- Clade: Rosids
- Order: Brassicales
- Family: Brassicaceae
- Genus: Eutrema
- Species: E. edwardsii

Binomial name
- Eutrema edwardsii R.Br.

Synonyms
- List: Draba laevigata Cham. & Schltdl.; Eutrema edwardsii var. intermedium (Turcz.) A.L.Ebel; Eutrema intermedium Turcz.; Eutrema labradoricum Turcz.; Eutrema septigerum Bunge; Sisymbrium edwardsii Trautv.; Smelowskia parviflora Walp.; Thlaspi septigerum (Bunge) Jafri

Species of plant

Eutrema edwardsii, called Edwards' mock wallflower, is a species of flowering plant in the wasabi genus Eutrema, mustard family Brassicaceae. It has a nearly panarctic distribution, only absent from northern Europe, and extending to Tibet. A rhizomatous geophyte reaching 18 in (46 cm), it is found in a variety of arctic and subarctic habitats; tundra, screefields, formerly glaciated hills, grassy streamsides, and peat ridges. It is an allopolyploid complex of tetraploid, hexaploid, and octaploid populations.
