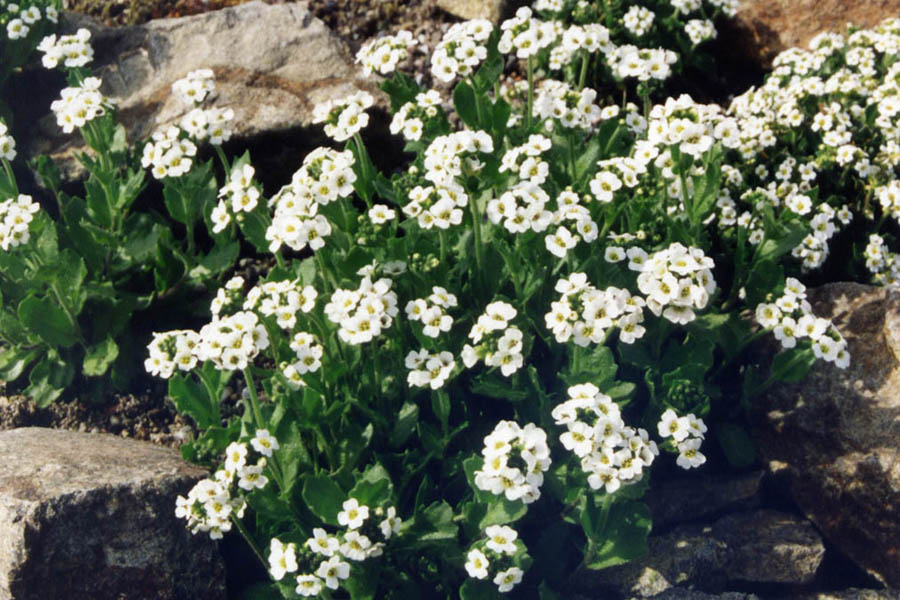

Conservation status
- Secure (NatureServe)

Scientific classification
- Kingdom: Plantae
- Clade: Embryophytes
- Clade: Tracheophytes
- Clade: Spermatophytes
- Clade: Angiosperms
- Clade: Eudicots
- Clade: Rosids
- Order: Brassicales
- Family: Brassicaceae
- Genus: Draba
- Species: D. fladnizensis

Binomial name
- Draba fladnizensis Wulfen

= Draba fladnizensis =

Species of flowering plant

Draba fladnizensis is a species of plant in the family Brassicaceae known by the common names arctic draba, Austrian draba, and white arctic whitlow-grass. It has a circumpolar distribution, occurring throughout the northern latitudes of the Northern Hemisphere. It is present in Europe, Asia, and North America from Alaska across northern Canada to Greenland. Its distribution extends south through the higher elevations in the Rocky Mountains to Colorado and Utah. It is common and widespread in the Canadian Arctic Archipelago, occurring on several Arctic islands including Baffin, Devon, and Ellesmere Islands. It is named after the Austrian village of Flattnitz, in the Gurktaler Alpen.

This petite perennial plant grows at ground level, sometimes forming a mat around its caudex. The basal leaves have blades up to 1.6 centimetres (0.63 in) long which are variable in shape. They have tiny hairs along the edges. There are sometimes one or two leaves on the short flowering stem. This grows a few centimeters tall and has two or more flowers in a raceme. The flower has white petals no more than 2.5 millimetres (0.098 in) long and greenish or purplish sepals. The fruit is a small, flattened silicle.
