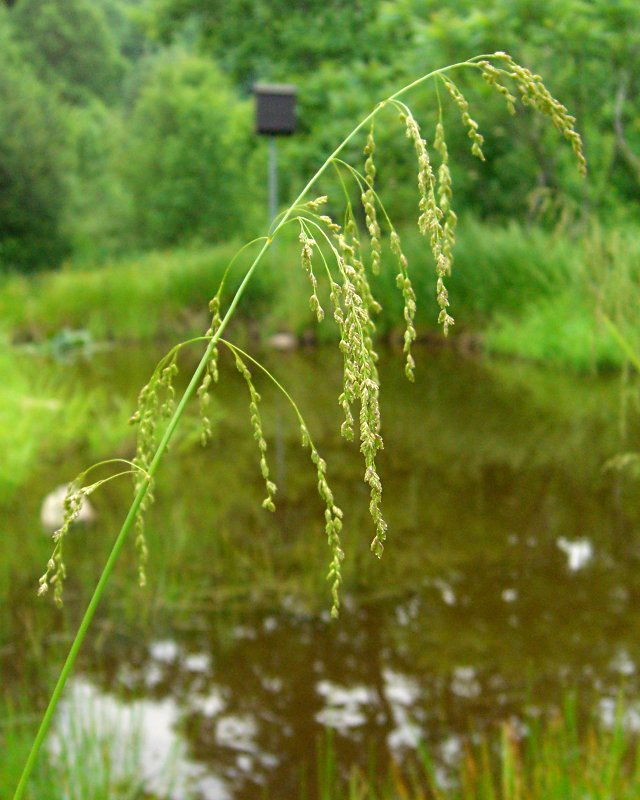
- Glyceria striata

Scientific classification
- Kingdom: Plantae
- Clade: Embryophytes
- Clade: Tracheophytes
- Clade: Spermatophytes
- Clade: Angiosperms
- Clade: Monocots
- Clade: Commelinids
- Order: Poales
- Family: Poaceae
- Subfamily: Pooideae
- Supertribe: Melicodae
- Tribe: Meliceae
- Genus: Glyceria; R.Br. 1810 not Nutt. 1818 (syn of Hydrocotyle in Apiaceae)

Type species
- Glyceria fluitans R.Br.

Synonyms
- Exydra Endl.; Hemibromus Steud.; Hydrochloa Hartm. 1819), illegitimate homonym not P.Beauv. 1812; Hydropoa (Dumort.) Dumort.; Nevroloma Raf.; Porroteranthe Steud.

= Glyceria =

Genus of grasses

Glyceria is a widespread genus of grass family common across Eurasia, Australia, North Africa, and the Americas.

Glyceria is known commonly as mannagrass in the United States, or, in the UK, sweet-grass. These are perennial rhizomatous grasses found in wet areas in temperate regions worldwide. The base of the grass grows along the ground and may root at several places. Then it grows erect and bears leaf blades which may be flat or folded. The panicle inflorescences nod when heavy. Some mannagrasses are considered weeds while others are endangered in their native habitats.

Species

- Glyceria acutiflora - creeping mannagrass - China, Korea, Japan, northeastern + east-central USA
- Glyceria alnasteretum - Alaska, Russian Far East, Japan, Korea
- Glyceria × amurensis - Amur Oblast
- Glyceria arkansana - Arkansas mannagrass - south-central USA
- Glyceria arundinacea - Eurasia from Hungary to Korea
- Glyceria australis - Australian sweetgrass - Australia
- Glyceria borealis - northern mannagrass - western, north-central, + northeastern USA incl Alaska; Canada incl Yukon + Northwest Territories; Mexico (Chihuahua)
- Glyceria canadensis - rattlesnake mannagrass, Canadian mannagrass - Canada; USA (Northeast, Great Lakes, Oregon, Washington)
- Glyceria caspia - Caucasus
- Glyceria chinensis - China (Yunnan, Guizhou)
- Glyceria colombiana - Colombia
- Glyceria declinata - waxy mannagrass, low glyceria, small sweet-grass - Europe, Morocco, Madeira, Azores, Canary Islands; naturalized in scattered locales in North America and New Zealand
- Glyceria depauperata - Japan, Kuril Islands
- Glyceria × digenea - France, Czech Republic
- Glyceria drummondii - Western Australia
- Glyceria elata - tall mannagrass - western USA, British Columbia, Alberta
- Glyceria fluitans - water mannagrass, floating sweet-grass - Morocco; Eurasia from Iceland + Portugal to Turkmenistan
- Glyceria × gatineauensis - Québec, New York, West Virginia
- Glyceria grandis - American mannagrass - USA incl Alaska; Canada incl Yukon + Northwest Territories
- Glyceria insularis - Tristan da Cunha
- Glyceria ischyroneura - Japan, Kuril Islands, Korea
- Glyceria latispicea - New South Wales
- Glyceria leptolepis - Russian Far East, China incl Taiwan, Korea, Japan
- Glyceria leptorhiza - Korea, Honshu, Hokkaido, Heilongjiang, Amur Oblast, Khabarovsk, Zabaykalsky Krai
- Glyceria leptostachya - davy mannagrass, narrow mannagrass - California, Oregon, Washington, British Columbia, Alaska
- Glyceria lithuanica - Lithuanian mannagrass - northern Eurasia from Norway to Korea
- Glyceria maxima - reed mannagrass, English watergrass, reed sweet-grass - Eurasia from Ireland to Xinjiang
- Glyceria melicaria - melic mannagrass - eastern North America
- Glyceria multiflora - Chile, Argentina, Uruguay, Rio Grande do Sul, Santa Catarina
- Glyceria nemoralis - Caucasus, central + eastern Europe
- Glyceria notata - marked glyceria, plicate sweet-grass - Eurasia + North Africa from Denmark + Morocco to Xinjiang
- Glyceria nubigena - Great Smoky Mountain mannagrass - Great Smoky Mountains of North Carolina + Tennessee
- Glyceria obtusa - Atlantic mannagrass - eastern North America
- Glyceria occidentalis - northwestern mannagrass - California, Oregon, Washington, British Columbia, Idaho, Nevada
- Glyceria × ottawensis - Ontario
- Glyceria × pedicellata - northern + central Europe
- Glyceria pulchella - MacKenzie Valley mannagrass, beautiful glyceria - Alaska, western Canada incl Yukon + Northwest Territories
- Glyceria saltensis - Salta Province in Argentina
- Glyceria septentrionalis - floating mannagrass - eastern USA, eastern Canada, northeastern Mexico
- Glyceria spicata - India, Mediterranean
- Glyceria spiculosa - eastern Russia, northern China, Korea
- Glyceria striata - fowl mannagrass, ridged glyceria - Canada incl Arctic Territories, USA incl Alaska, Mexico, Guatemala
- Glyceria × tokitana Masamura - Japan
- Glyceria tonglensis C.B.Clarke - Himalayas, China incl Tibet

formerly included

Numerous species now considered better suited to other genera: Arctophila Catabrosa Colpodium Dryopoa Eragrostis Hydrocotyle Melica Phippsia Poa Puccinellia Scolochloa Torreyochloa Triplasis
