= Puccinellia lucida =

Scientific classification
- Kingdom: Plantae
- Clade: Embryophytes
- Clade: Tracheophytes
- Clade: Angiosperms
- Clade: Monocots
- Clade: Commelinids
- Order: Poales
- Family: Poaceae
- Subfamily: Pooideae
- Genus: Puccinellia
- Species: P. lucida

Binomial name
- Puccinellia lucida Fernald & Weath.

Species of grass

Puccinellia lucida is a perennial grass that grows in south-eastern Canada and occasionally elsewhere in the United States. Its specific epithet lucida means "shining", referring to the plant's lustrous glumes.

== Description ==
Puccinellia lucida is a green, loosely cespitose grass growing 15–70 cm (5.9–27.6 in) tall. It has cauline leaves with flaccid, involute blades. Its basal leaf sheaths can be somewhat purple. Its acute ligule is 1.7–2.5 mm (0.067–0.098 in) long. Its diffuse panicle is 10–25 cm (3.9–9.8 in) long, with filiform, scabrous floral branches. Its pale green spikelets are 5–9 mm (0.20–0.35 in) long and bear three to five flowers. Its glumes are thin and lustrous; the first glume is 2–3.5 mm (0.079–0.138 in) long, hyaline above, and minutely serrulate, and its second glume is 2.5–4 mm (0.098–0.157 in) long. Its lemmas are 3–4 mm (0.12–0.16 in) long, broadly ovate, acute, and are pubescent especially towards their base where hairs become longer. The grass flowers from July into August.

Puccinellia lucida is most similar to the species Puccinellia laurentiana, Puccinellia airoides, and Puccinellia macra. From the first two species P. lucida differs in its longer, thinner, and lustrous lemmas; from the first additionally by its scabrous floral branches and softer, greener foliage, and from the second by its longer grain and less exerted panicle. From the third species P. lucida differs in its involute leaves, diffuse panicle, pale spikelets, and longer lemmas.

== Habitat and distribution ==
Puccinellia lucida occurs in saline marches and coastal sands along the lower St. Lawrence River in Quebec, but rare populations have also been found in Wyoming to British Columbia and into California.
