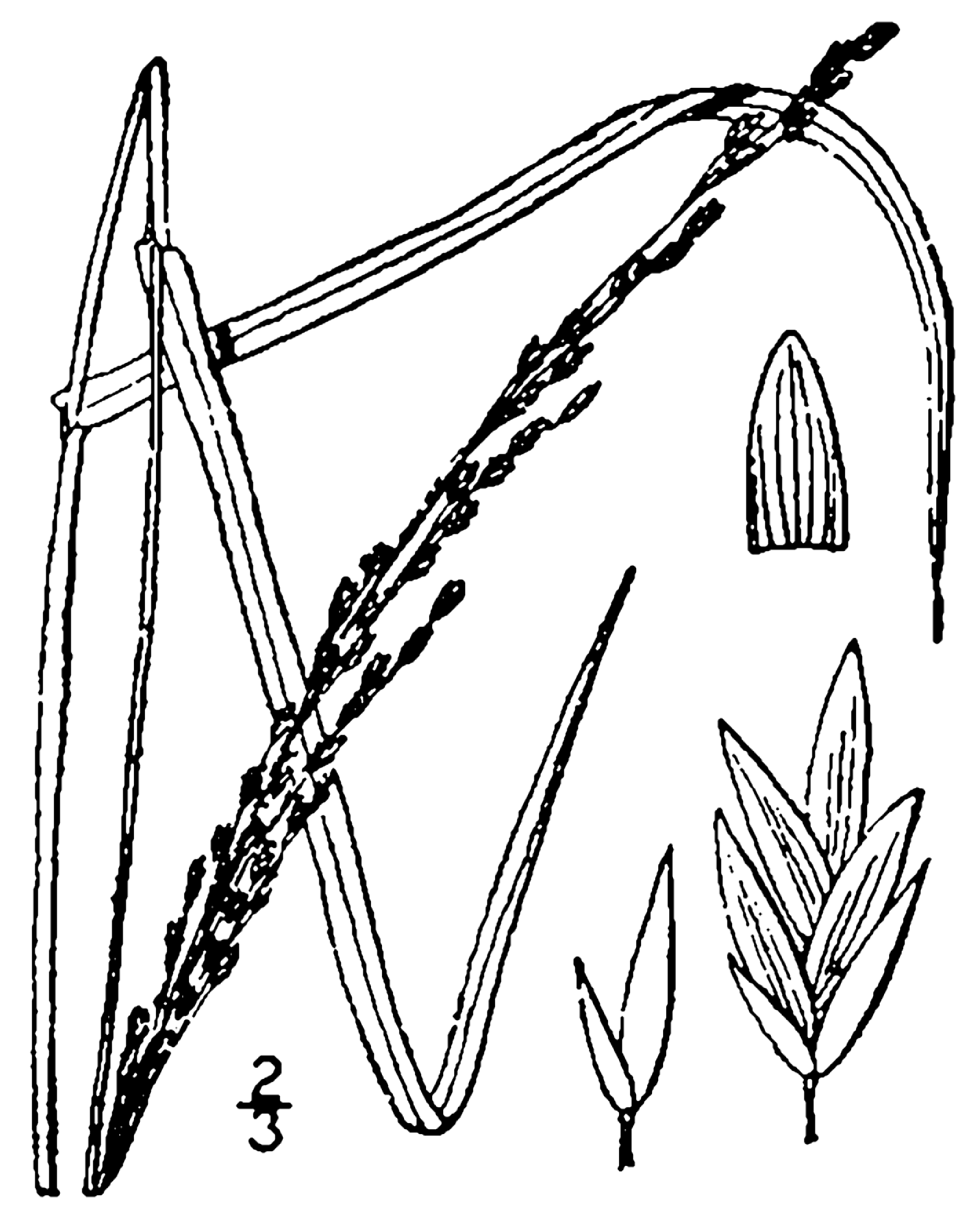

Scientific classification
- Kingdom: Plantae
- Clade: Tracheophytes
- Clade: Angiosperms
- Clade: Monocots
- Clade: Commelinids
- Order: Poales
- Family: Poaceae
- Subfamily: Pooideae
- Genus: Glyceria
- Species: G. melicaria

Binomial name
- Glyceria melicaria (Michx.) F. T. Hubbard

Synonyms
- Glyceria torreyana Hitchc.; Panicularia torreyana Merr.; Panicularia melicaria Hitchc.

= Glyceria melicaria =

Species of grass

Glyceria melicaria, the melic mannagrass or northeastern mannagrass, is a perennial grass found in the eastern United States. Its specific epithet melicaria means "similar to Melica". Its diploid number is 40.

== Description ==
Glyceria melicaria grows erect culms from a creeping base, with the solitary or few culms growing 0.6–1.2 m (2 ft 0 in – 3 ft 11 in) tall. Its leaf sheaths are smooth and its ligules are translucent. Its lax, elongate leaves are 25–40 cm (9.8–15.7 in) long and 2–7 mm (0.079–0.276 in) wide, and are smooth on their bottom side but scabrous on the top. Its linear-cylindrical panicle is 10–30 cm (3.9–11.8 in) long and nods down towards its end. The panicle's closely appressed floral branches have thirty to upwards of sixty spikelets per branch. Its appressed spikelets are about 4 mm long and have three to four flowers. Its glumes are lanceolate and have acute apices. The lower glume is 1.3-2.4 mm and the upper glume is 1.7-3 mm. Its five- to seven-veined lemmas are 1.9-2.8 mm long, with its paleas roughly the same size. The grass flowers from late June to August.

Glyceria × gatineauensis is a sterile hybrid between Glyceria striata and G. melicaria which has been found to occur in Quebec and possibly West Virginia. It resembles G. melicaria but has longer and less appressed panicle branches, growing up to 12 cm (4.7 in) long. The hybrid is a triploid.

== Habitat and distribution ==
Glyceria melicaria grows in wet soils, swamps, and wet forests from New Brunswick to Ontario and south into Illinois and the northeastern United States, as well as down into the Appalachian Mountains as far south as northern Georgia.
