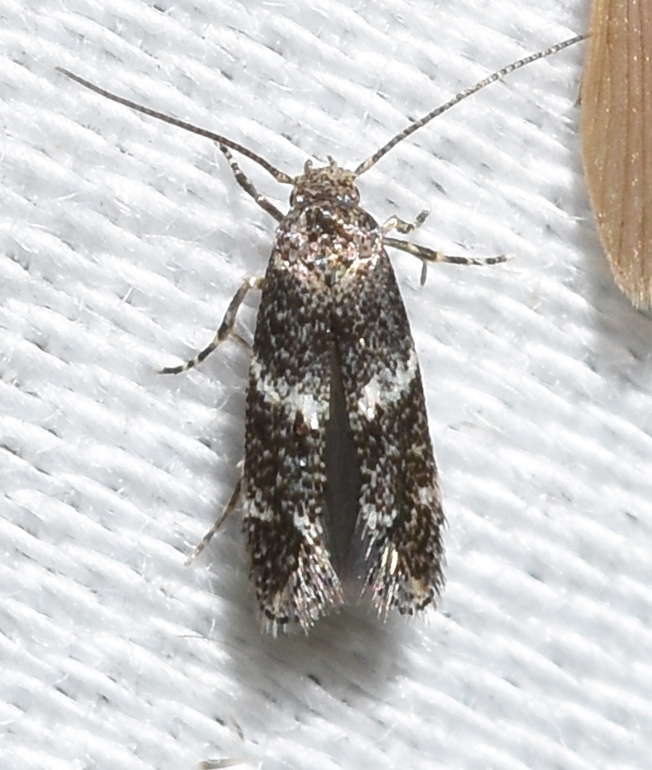

Scientific classification
- Domain: Eukaryota
- Kingdom: Animalia
- Phylum: Arthropoda
- Class: Insecta
- Order: Lepidoptera
- Family: Elachistidae
- Genus: Elachista
- Species: E. irrorata

Binomial name
- Elachista irrorata Braun, 1920

Synonyms
- Elachista philopatris Meyrick, 1932

= Elachista irrorata =

Species of moth

Elachista irrorata is a moth of the family Elachistidae. It is found in North America, where it has been recorded from Illinois, Indiana, Maine, New Jersey, New York, Ohio, Ontario, Pennsylvania, Tennessee, Virginia and West Virginia.

The wingspan is 8.2–11 mm. Adults have been recorded on wing from March to October.

The larvae feed on Glyceria striata and Agrostis perennans. They mine the leaves of their host plant. The larvae can be found in April and May.
