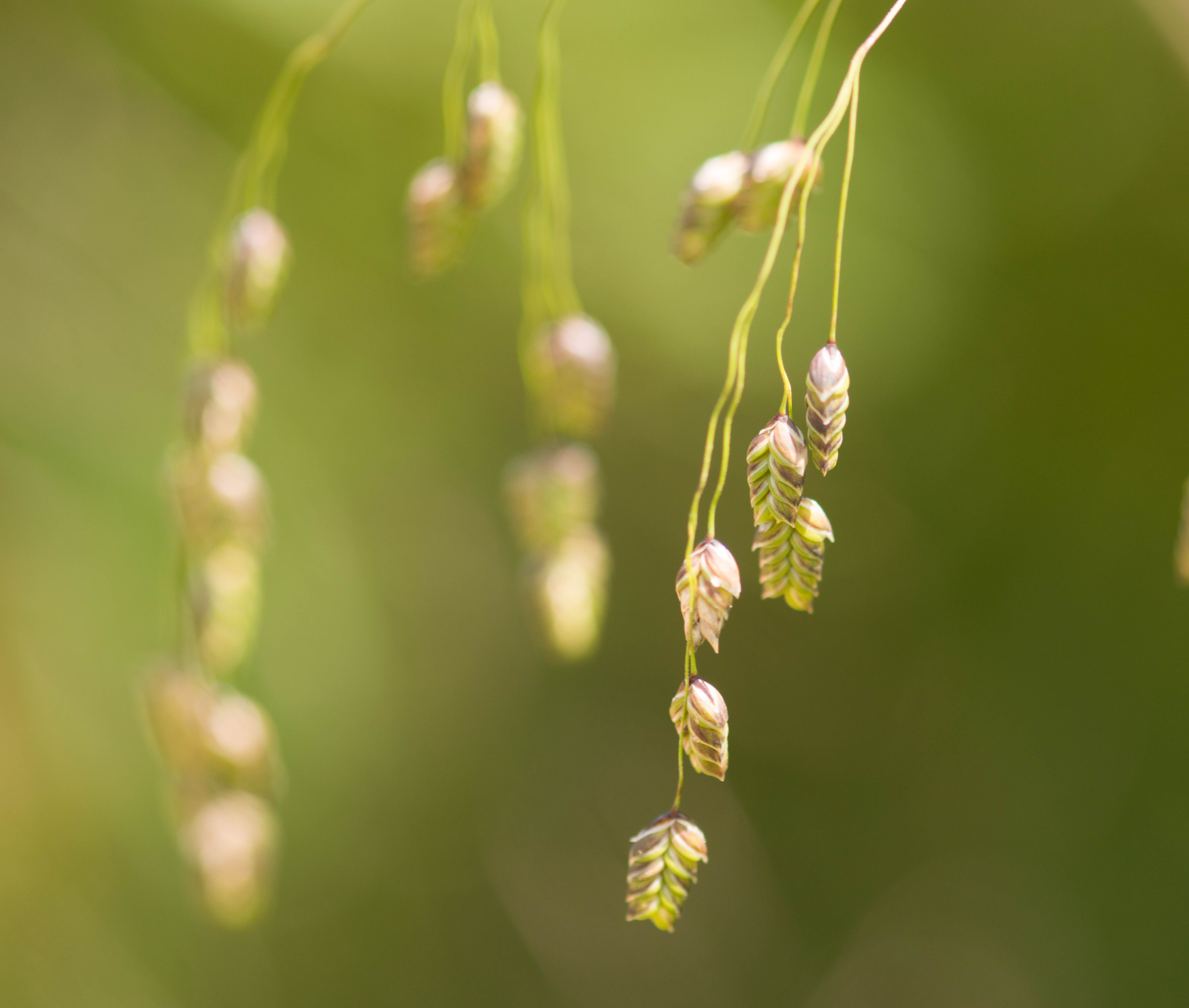

Scientific classification
- Kingdom: Plantae
- Clade: Tracheophytes
- Clade: Angiosperms
- Clade: Monocots
- Clade: Commelinids
- Order: Poales
- Family: Poaceae
- Subfamily: Pooideae
- Genus: Glyceria
- Species: G. canadensis

Binomial name
- Glyceria canadensis (Michx.) Trin.
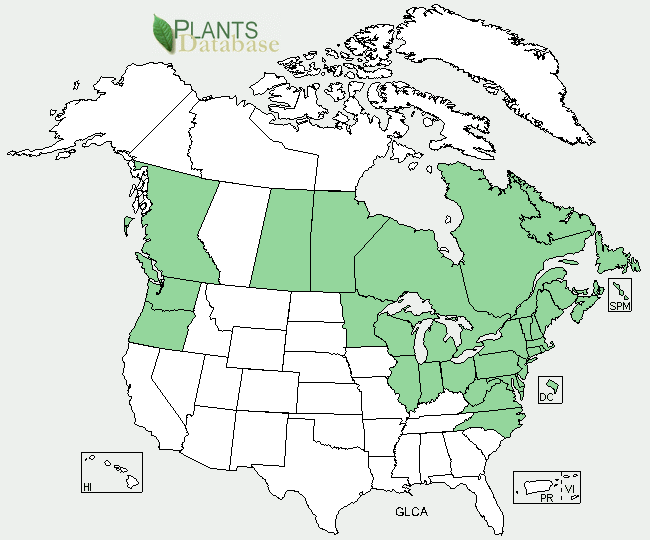

Synonyms
- Briza canadensis Michx.; Glyceria canadensis var. laxa (Scribn.) Hitchc.; Glyceria laxa (Scribn.) Scribn. ex E.L.Rand & Redfield; Glyceria × ottawensis Bowden; Megastachya canadensis (Michx.) Roem. & Schult.; Nevroloma canadensis (Michx.) Raf.; Panicularia canadensis (Michx.) Kuntze; Panicularia laxa Scribn.; Poa canadensis (Michx.) Torr.

= Glyceria canadensis =

Species of grass

Glyceria canadensis is a species of grass in the genus Glyceria which is known by the common name rattlesnake mannagrass. It is native to North America, from British Columbia to Newfoundland and south to North Carolina. It is commonly found in wet areas.

== Habitat ==
G. canadensis is an obligate wetland species, meaning it will not grow in areas which are not wetlands. These habitats include moist woods, marshes, swamps, wet woods, and shores along streams and lakes.

== Description ==
Glyceria canadensis is a species of perennial bunchgrass which can grow up to 1m tall. The leaves are between 3-8mm wide, as with other species in the genus Glyceria the leaf sheaths are fused for the majority of their length.

Flowers are produced in a panicle typically between June and September depending on location. The panicle is typically open, containing few spikelets and each spikelet tends to droop giving the overall inflorescence a curved shape. Each spikelet is 3-5mm long and contains 5-10 individual florets. The lemmas are 2.9-4mm long.

G. canadensis hybridizes with Glyceria grandis to form the hybrid Glyceria canadenis × grandis. This hybrid is very similar to G. canadensis but with spikelets containing between 3-6 florets as opposed to 5-10 found in G. canadensis. The hybrid occurs in the same habitat as G. canadensis. This hybrid has been recognized by some authors as Glyceria laxa.
