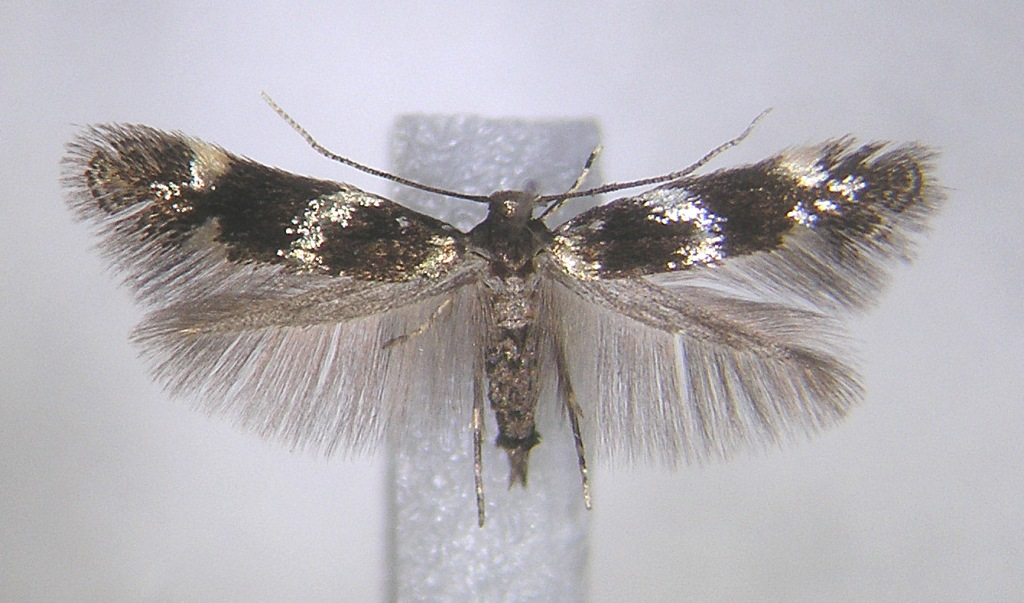

Scientific classification
- Domain: Eukaryota
- Kingdom: Animalia
- Phylum: Arthropoda
- Class: Insecta
- Order: Lepidoptera
- Family: Elachistidae
- Genus: Elachista
- Species: E. apicipunctella

Binomial name
- Elachista apicipunctella Stainton, 1849

= Elachista apicipunctella =

Species of moth

Elachista apicipunctella is a moth of the family Elachistidae found in Europe. It is found in all of Europe (except the Iberian Peninsula and the Balkan Peninsula), east into northern Russia.

== Description ==
The wingspan is 10–11 millimetres (0.39–0.43 in). The head is silvery -white. Forewings are dark fuscous, bronzy-tinged; base silvery; a somewhat oblique fascia before middle, a tornal spot, a larger triangular spot beyond it on costa, and a subapical dot silvery white. Hindwings are grey. The larva is pale yellow; head brown.

Adults are on wing from late April to July. Normally, there is one generation per year, although there might be a second generation in warmer areas.

The larvae feed on Agrostis, Arrhenatherum elatius, Brachypodium sylvaticum, Calamagrostis arundinacea, Dactylis glomerata, Deschampsia cespitosa, Elymus caninus, Festuca altissima, Festuca gigantea, Glyceria lithuanica, Holcus mollis, Melica nutans, Milium effusum, Poa nemoralis and Poa remota.

== Distribution ==
It is found in all of Europe (except the Iberian Peninsula and the Balkan Peninsula), east into northern Russia.
