= Torreyochloa pallida var. fernaldii =

Scientific classification
- Kingdom: Plantae
- Clade: Tracheophytes
- Clade: Angiosperms
- Clade: Monocots
- Clade: Commelinids
- Order: Poales
- Family: Poaceae
- Subfamily: Pooideae
- Genus: Torreyochloa
- Species: T. pallida
- Variety: T. p. var. fernaldii

Trinomial name
- Torreyochloa pallida var. fernaldii (Hitchc.) Dore ex Koyama & Kawano

Variety of grass

Torreyochloa pallida var. fernaldii, also called Fernald's false manna grass, is a perennial flowering grass found across Canada and the northeastern United States. It is also known as Puccinellia fernaldii, Glyceria pallida var. fernaldii, Glyceria fernaldii, and Torreyochloa fernaldii.

== Description ==
It has leaves with blades 1.5–3.5 mm wide and ligules 2.5–6.5 mm long. Its anthers are 0.3–0.5 mm long.

== Distribution and habitat ==
It is found across the northeastern U.S. and Great Lakes states and in most of southern Canada, excepting Alberta. There are also populations in Tennessee and Wyoming.

== Conservation ==
It is listed as endangered in Maryland and Kentucky, and special concern in Tennessee.
