= Giardino Botanico Litoraneo di Porto Caleri =

Botanical garden in Italy

Coordinates: 45°04′N 12°14′E

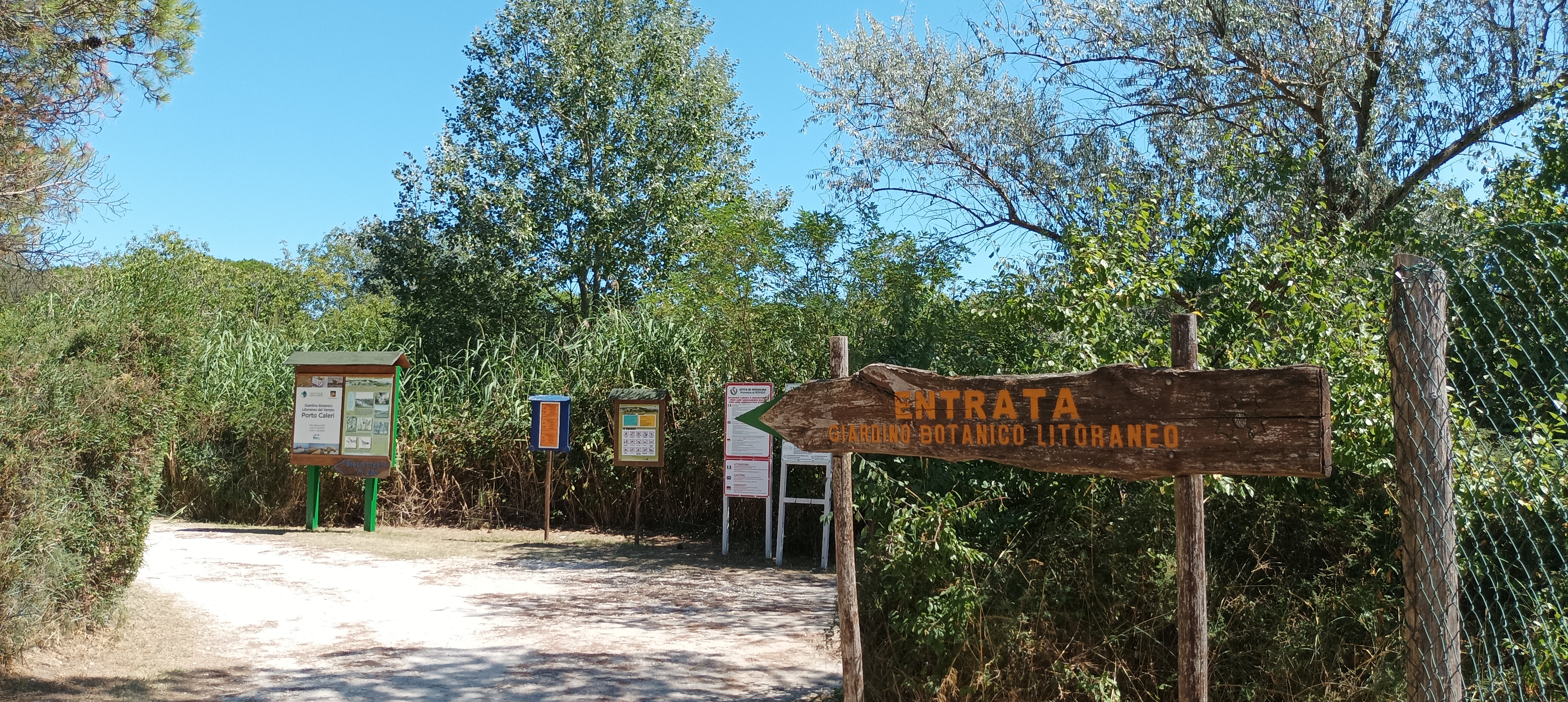
The trail to garden access

The Giardino Botanico Litoraneo di Porto Caleri (nearly 23 hectares), also known as the Giardino Botanico Litoraneo del Veneto, is a nature preserve and botanical garden located on Via Porto Caleri, Rosolina Mare, Rosolina, Province of Rovigo, Veneto, Italy. It is open several days a week in the warmer months.

The garden was established in 1990, and operated by the Servizio Forestale Regionale di Padova e Rovigo in collaboration with the University of Padua. It consists of a thin strip of sand dunes between the mouth of the river Adige and the Po di Levante, containing indigenous vegetation of loose sand, salt marsh, and pine and elm forests. All told, it contains a dozen ecosystems with about 220 plant species, including native orchids. Three footpaths (600 meters, 1650 meters, and 2850 meters in length) allow close observation of the environment.

== Specimens ==
The garden's species include:

- Agropyretum juncei
- Agropyron junceum
- Ambrosia maritima
- Ammophila littoralis
- Ammophiletum arenariae
- Artemisia coerulescens
- Arthrocnemum fruticosum
- Aster tripolium
- Cakile marittima
- Calystegia soldanella
- Centaurea tommasinii
- Cephalantera
- Cladium mariscus
- Conyza canadensis
- Cycloloma atriplicifolia
- Cynodon dactylon
- Cyperus kalli
- Echinophoro spinosae
- Enteromorpha
- Erianthus ravennae
- Eryngium maritimum
- Frangula alnus
- Halimione portulacoides
- Hippophae rhamnoides
- Juniperus communis
- Limonium serotinum
- Oenothera biennis
- Ophrys sphecodes
- Orchis morio
- Phillyrea
- Phragmites australis
- Pinus pinaster
- Pinus pinea
- Puccinellia palustris
- Quercus ilex
- Scabiosa argentea
- Schoenus
- nigricans
- Typha
- Ulmus minor
- Ulva
- Vulpia membranacea
- Xanthium italicum
- Zosteretum noltii

== See also ==
- List of botanical gardens in Italy
