= Glyceria acutiflora =

Scientific classification
- Kingdom: Plantae
- Clade: Tracheophytes
- Clade: Angiosperms
- Clade: Monocots
- Clade: Commelinids
- Order: Poales
- Family: Poaceae
- Subfamily: Pooideae
- Genus: Glyceria
- Species: G. acutiflora

Binomial name
- Glyceria acutiflora Torr.

Synonyms
- Festuca acutiflora (Torr.) Bigelow; Hemibromus japonicus Steud.; Panicularia acutiflora (Torr.) Kuntze

Species of grass

Glyceria acutiflora, the creeping mannagrass, is a perennial grass found in the north-eastern United States and in north-eastern Asia. Its specific epithet acutiflora means "acute-flowered". It has a diploid number of 40.

== Description ==
Glyceria acutiflora is a coarse grass with flattened, slender culms growing 30–100 cm (12–39 in) high from decumbent bases. Its leaf sheaths overlap each other, with the highest overlapping the base of the panicle. Its ligules are 5–9 mm (0.20–0.35 in) long. Its scabrous leaf blades are 6–20 cm (2.4–7.9 in) long and 1–7 mm (0.039–0.276 in) wide. Its simple or subsimple panicle is 15–40 cm (5.9–15.7 in) long, with appressed or somewhat spreading floral branches. Its subsessile spikelets are 1.5–4 cm (0.59–1.57 in) long with five to thirteen flowers. Its acute glumes are unequal, with lower glumes being 1.3–4.5 mm (0.051–0.177 in) and upper glumes 3–7 mm (0.12–0.28 in) long. Its seven-veined lemmas are 6–10 mm (0.24–0.39 in) long, strongly acute, and scabrous; its bicuspidate paleas exceed its lemmas by 1.5–3 mm (0.059–0.118 in). The grass flowers from May to July and rarely into August.

The long paleas of G. acutiflora make it one of the most distinctive species of Glyceria in North America. When immature and still growing, the grass resembles Glyceria borealis.

== Habitat and distribution ==
Glyceria acutiflora can be found growing in muddy pools and the margins of ponds from New Hampshire to Michigan and south to Tennessee and Missouri. The grass is a problematic weed in China, germinating over a wide range of temperatures and being resistant to osmotic and salt stress.
