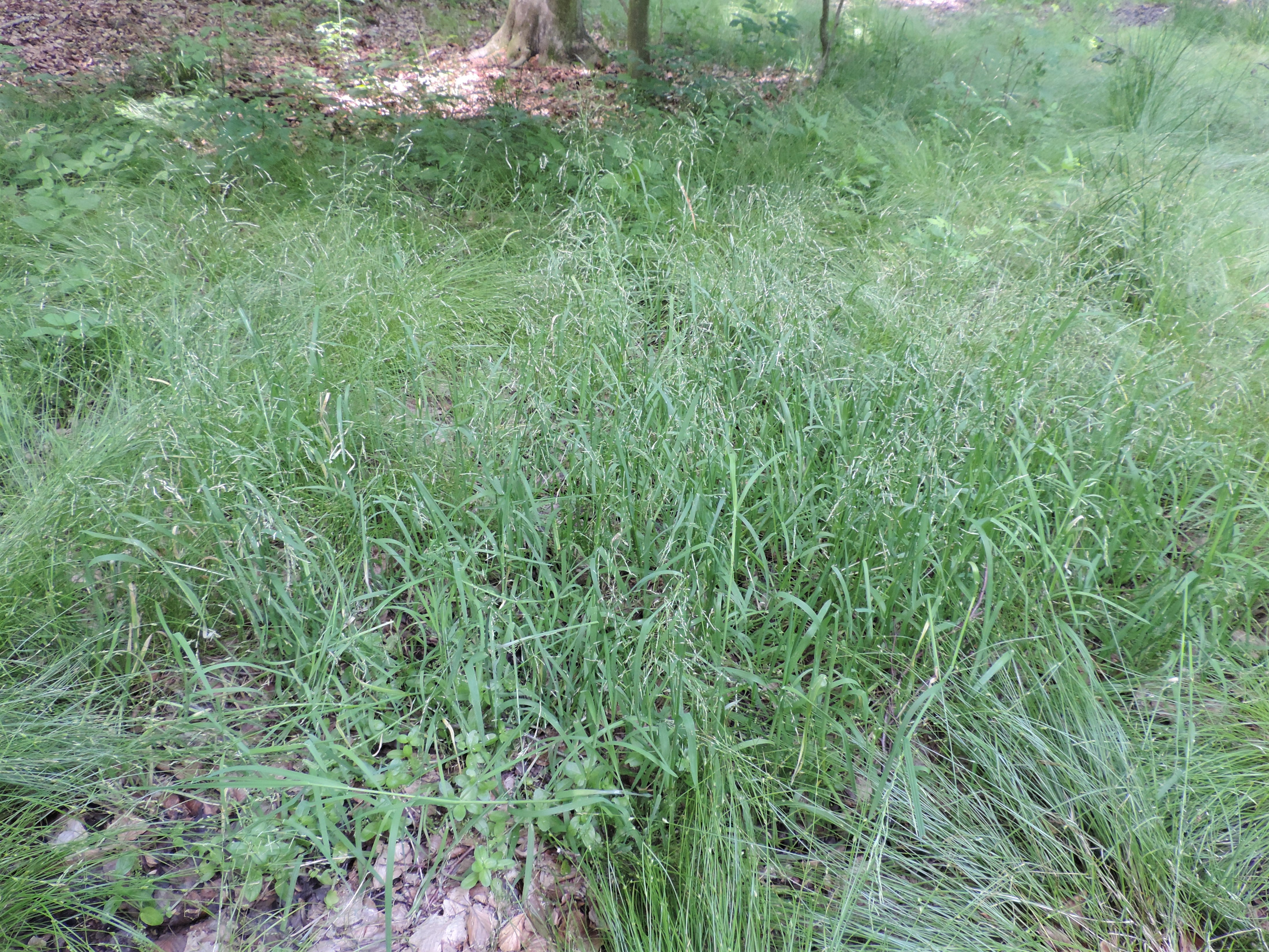

Scientific classification
- Kingdom: Plantae
- Clade: Tracheophytes
- Clade: Angiosperms
- Clade: Monocots
- Clade: Commelinids
- Order: Poales
- Family: Poaceae
- Subfamily: Pooideae
- Genus: Glyceria
- Species: G. nemoralis

Binomial name
- Glyceria nemoralis (R.Uechtr.) R.Uechtr. & Koern.

= Glyceria nemoralis =

Species of grass

Glyceria nemoralis is a species of grass in the family Poaceae.

Its native range is from eastern-central and eastern Europe to the Caucasus.
