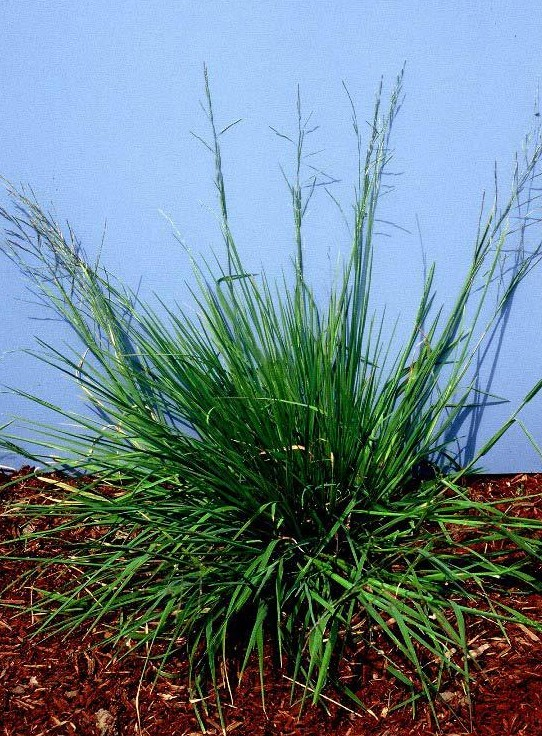

Conservation status
- Vulnerable (NatureServe)

Scientific classification
- Kingdom: Plantae
- Clade: Tracheophytes
- Clade: Angiosperms
- Clade: Monocots
- Clade: Commelinids
- Order: Poales
- Family: Poaceae
- Subfamily: Pooideae
- Genus: Glyceria
- Species: G. leptostachya

Binomial name
- Glyceria leptostachya Buckley

= Glyceria leptostachya =

Species of aquatic plant

Glyceria leptostachya is a species of mannagrass known by the common names davy mannagrass and narrow mannagrass.

== Distribution ==
It is native to western North America from Alaska to California, where it grows in wet places such as riverbanks.

== Description ==
This rhizomatous perennial grass produces narrow stems approaching a maximum height of 1.5 meters. The leaves may be flat or rolled along the edges and they have ligules up to a centimeter long. The inflorescence is narrow and compact, bearing spikelets parallel to the stem instead of spreading outward. Each spikelet is one to two centimeters long and contains up to 14 or 15 florets with membranous margins.
