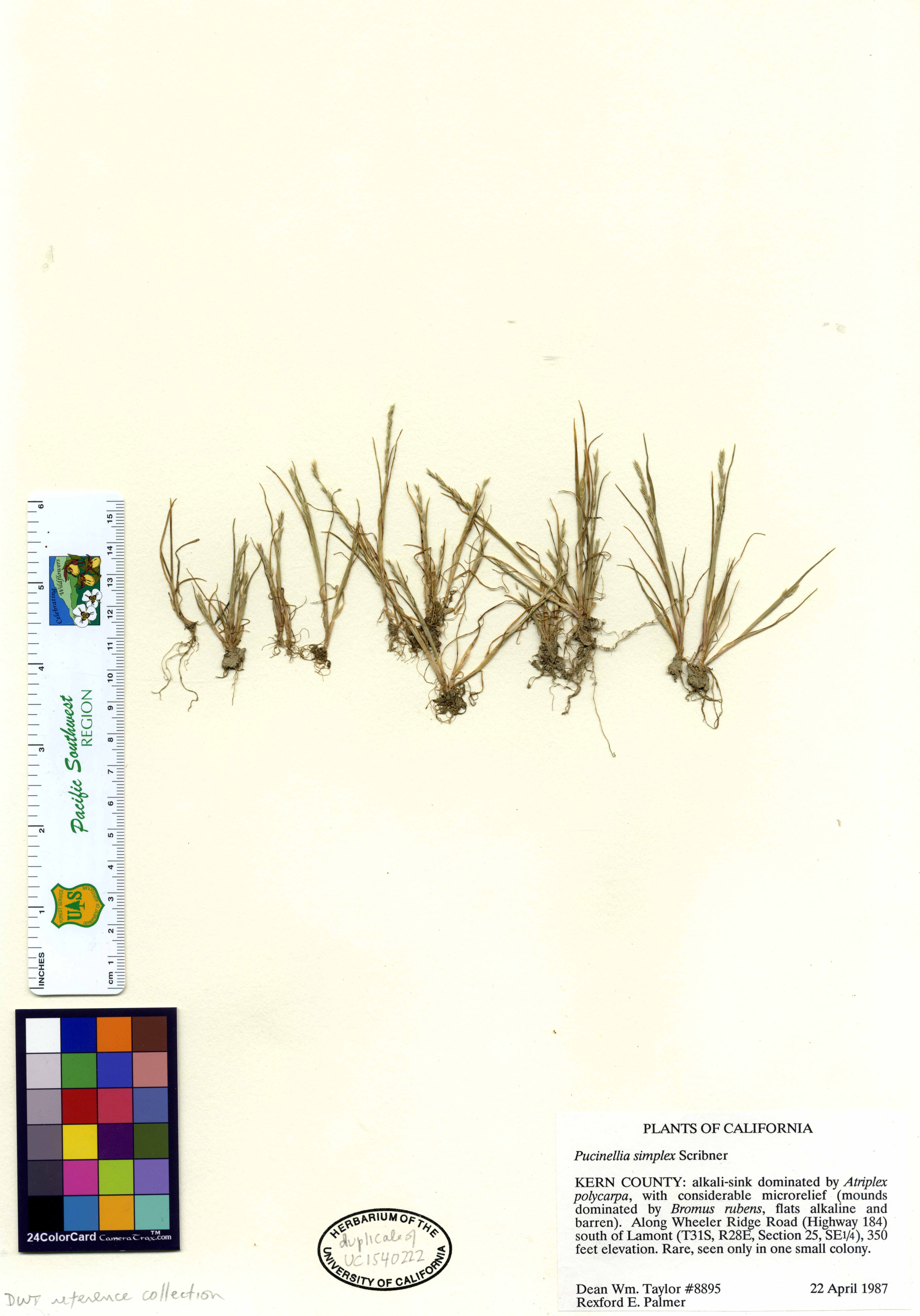

Conservation status
- Imperiled (NatureServe)

Scientific classification
- Kingdom: Plantae
- Clade: Tracheophytes
- Clade: Angiosperms
- Clade: Monocots
- Clade: Commelinids
- Order: Poales
- Family: Poaceae
- Subfamily: Pooideae
- Genus: Puccinellia
- Species: P. simplex

Binomial name
- Puccinellia simplex Scribn.

= Puccinellia simplex =

Species of grass

Puccinellia simplex is a species of grass known by the common names California alkaligrass and western alkali grass. It is native to California, where it grows in mineral springs and other moist habitat with saline soils in the Central Valley, Mojave Desert, and other areas. It is also known from Utah, but occurrences there are probably introduced. This annual grass grows up to about 25 centimeters tall. The inflorescence is generally a linear structure with parallel branches bearing small spikelets.
