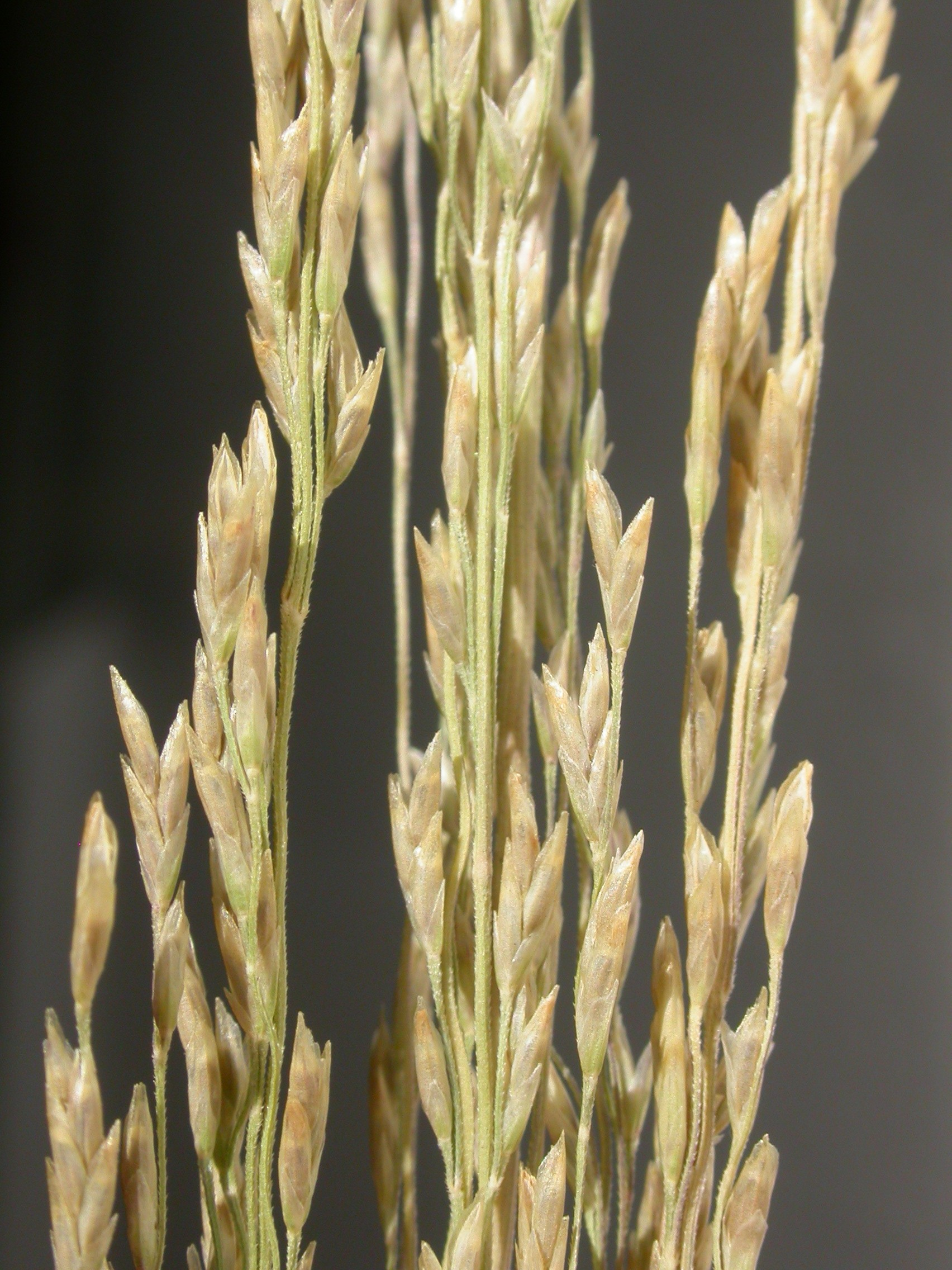

Scientific classification
- Kingdom: Plantae
- Clade: Tracheophytes
- Clade: Angiosperms
- Clade: Monocots
- Clade: Commelinids
- Order: Poales
- Family: Poaceae
- Subfamily: Pooideae
- Genus: Puccinellia
- Species: P. nuttalliana

Binomial name
- Puccinellia nuttalliana (Schult.) Hitchc.

Synonyms
- Puccinellia airoides

= Puccinellia nuttalliana =

Species of grass

Puccinellia nuttalliana is a species of grass known by the common name Nuttall's alkaligrass. It is native to North America, where it is widespread from Alaska east throughout Canada to Greenland, and common in the western and central United States. It is present in the Arctic, throughout the temperate mountain ranges, the Great Plains, the Great Basin, and along the western coastline of North America down through California.

Puccinellia nuttalliana is a halophytic grass, found in areas with saline soils. This is a perennial bunchgrass that is variable in form, remaining small and clumpy or producing erect stems up to a meter tall. The inflorescence is made up of a few thin, spreading branches which spread further and sometimes become reflexed as the fruit matures.
