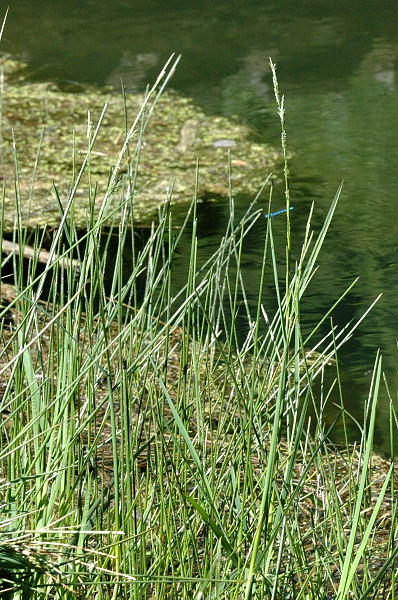

Conservation status
- Least Concern (IUCN 3.1)

Scientific classification
- Kingdom: Plantae
- Clade: Tracheophytes
- Clade: Angiosperms
- Clade: Monocots
- Clade: Commelinids
- Order: Poales
- Family: Poaceae
- Subfamily: Pooideae
- Genus: Glyceria
- Species: G. fluitans

Binomial name
- Glyceria fluitans (L.) R.Br.

= Glyceria fluitans =

Species of grass

Glyceria fluitans (syns Festuca fluitans, Poa fluitans, Panicularia fluitans), known as floating sweet-grass and water mannagrass, is a species of perennial grass in the genus Glyceria native to Europe, the Mediterranean region and Western Asia and occurring in wet areas such as ditches, riverbanks and ponds.

It has a creeping rootstock, a thick stem which rises to one metre. The leaves are long, narrow and pale green, rough on both sides, often folded at the keel which lies on the surface of the water.

The species epithet fluitans is Latin for "floating".

== History ==
Before the 19th century, the grains were widely harvested in Central Europe and Sweden, and traded as far as England. It was cooked and eaten as gruel.

== Flood tolerance ==
When a shoot is submerged in floodwater there is a strong reduction of diffusion of gases which limits oxygen and carbon dioxide availability. To handle the poor gas exchange while submerged, Glyceria fluitans forms a gas film around the leaves. The gas film allows an increase in the gas exchange since the diffusion of gas within the film is rapid. Glyceria fluitans has two kind of leaves: floating leaves and aerial leaves. Floating leaves form a gas film only on the adaxial side, instead aerial leaves form it on both sides. The formation of a gas film is caused from the superhydrophobicity of the leaves, which is provoked by the special structure of the leaves. Indeed, they have a plicate shape with ridges and grooves, on the microscale they have convex papillose epidermal cells forming papillae and three-dimensional epicuticular waxes. A gas film vanishes typically after 2–6 days of submergence because the leaves become hydrophilic. Regarding the beneficial trait of the gas film development, it can be said that Glyceria fluitans through it enhances the gas exchange and therefore the photosynthesis under flood conditions, but it is seen as a short term strategy.

== Environmental conservation ==
Glyceria fluitans is a component of purple moor grass and rush pastures, a type of Biodiversity Action Plan habitat in the UK. This habitat occurs on poorly drained neutral and acidic soils of the lowlands and upland fringe. It is found in the South West of England, especially in Devon.

At the Great Fen, researchers are running trials with Glyceria fluitans in order to assess its physical and financial viability as a crop in wet farming systems. Glyceria fluitans was chosen because it has been consumed by humans for a long time and because of its tolerance to a wide range of growing conditions. This tolerance originates from the fact that Glyceria fluitans is to some extent self-sterile and therefore outbreeding, which allows for adaptation.

== Farming techniques ==
The use and cultivation of Glyceria fluitans disappeared little by little during the 19th and 20th century due to its long gathering time and the disappearance of wetlands. For these reasons, known farming techniques are old and not very applicable to today's production systems anymore.

=== Harvest and postharvest treatments ===
Glyceria fluitans is harvested in the second half of June or early July. The maturation and harvest time of Glyceria fluitans were interesting for farmers in the past centuries because it preceded the wheat and rye harvest by 1 month, a period of significant cereal shortage. The grains of Glyceria fluitans were harvested with a sieve at the morning dew. The sieves were described with long handles and only strong people could use them. After the harvest, grains were dried out and grinded in a mortar filled with straw at the bottom so that the shells could be removed. The reasons why Glyceria fluitans grains were harvested at the morning dew are the following: firstly, grains tend to stick better to the sieves when humid. Secondly, the grains of dry plants tend to fall more easily on the ground at the smallest movement causing yield loses.

However, these harvest techniques are not suitable for today's agricultural production and new cultivars through genetic breeding should be developed.

=== Sowing ===
The sowing of Glyceria fluitans takes place in summer. The seeding density is 8 to 12 lbs per acre.

== As a food ==
Glyceria fluitans grains were popular in Poland, Germany, Hungary and other European countries for their sweet taste and nutrient richness. In Poland, foods containing Glyceria fluitans were pointed out as specialities of the local cuisine. Originally, Glyceria fluitans was used to prepare dishes as sweet cakes, flatbreads, dumplings, with butter or boiled milk, broths and soups, with oriental spices, as well as in sausages as binding additive.

Due to its healthy properties, between the 17th and 18th century, pharmacopoeias advised its consumption to people with debilitating diseases as well as malnourished young people.

=== Nutrition ===
==== Nutrient content ====
100 g of Glyceria fluitans grains (endosperm, ca. 13.5% water content) contain about: 9.69% of protein, 0.43% of total fat, 75.06% of carbohydrate (starch and sugar), 0.21% of dietary fiber and 0.61% of ash.

== Gallery ==
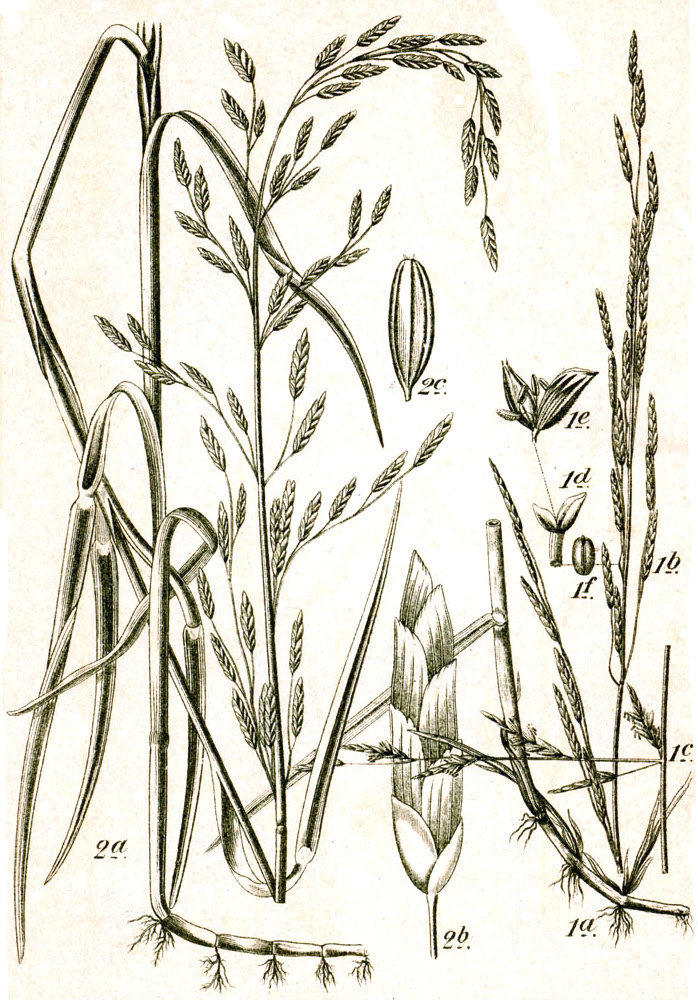
Glyceria fluitans (1)
Illustration in:
Jakob Sturm: "Deutschlands Flora in Abbildungen",
Stuttgart (1796)

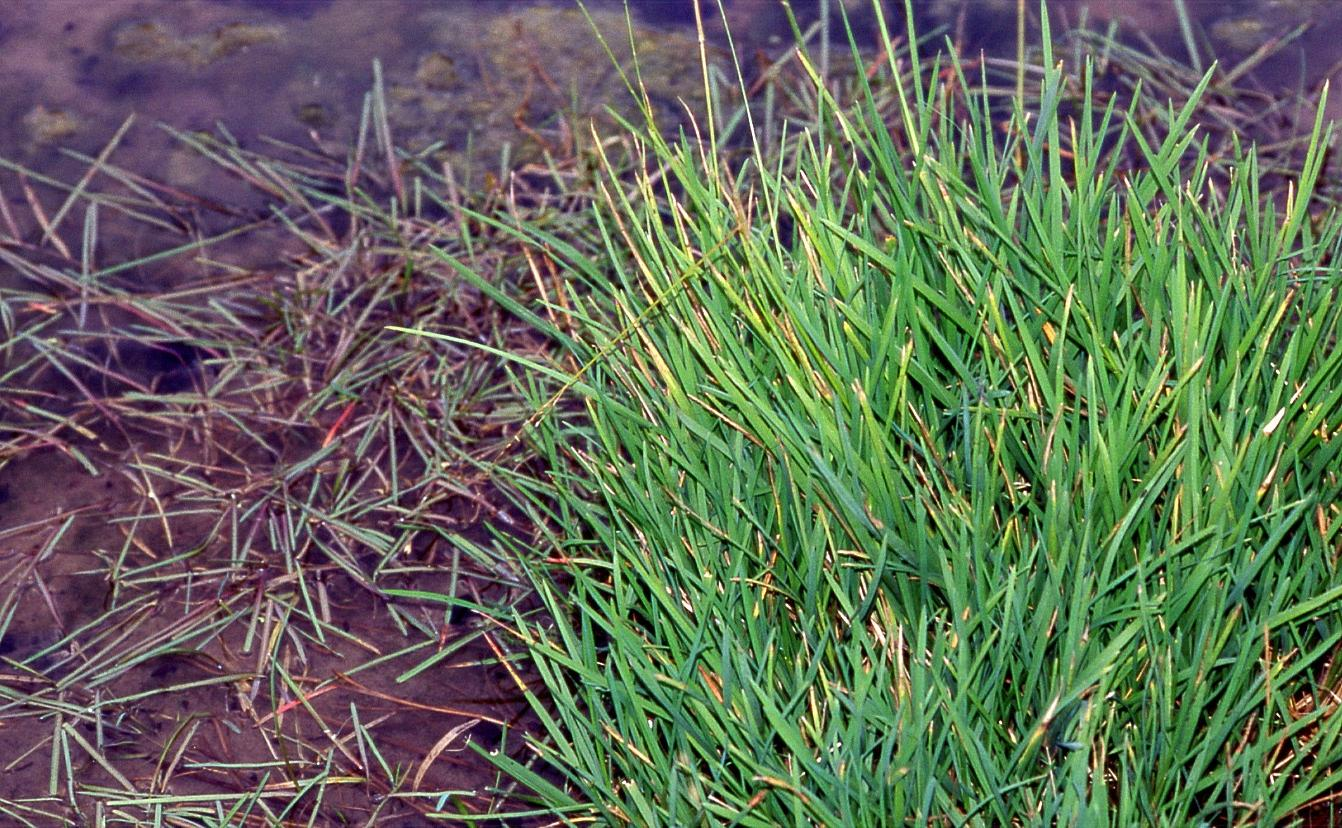

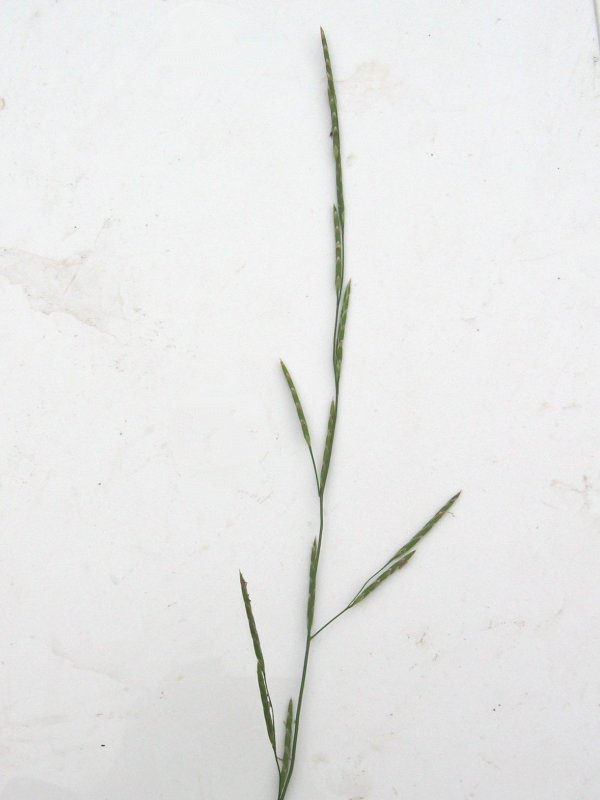

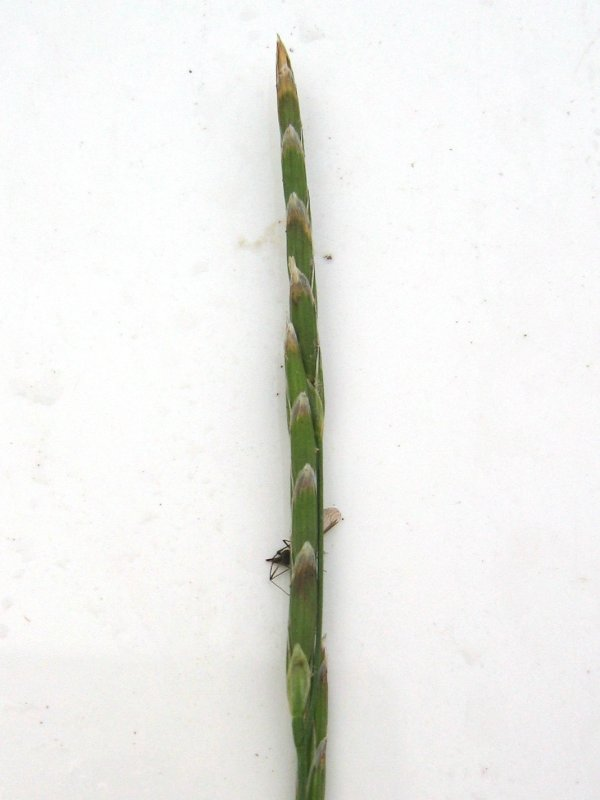

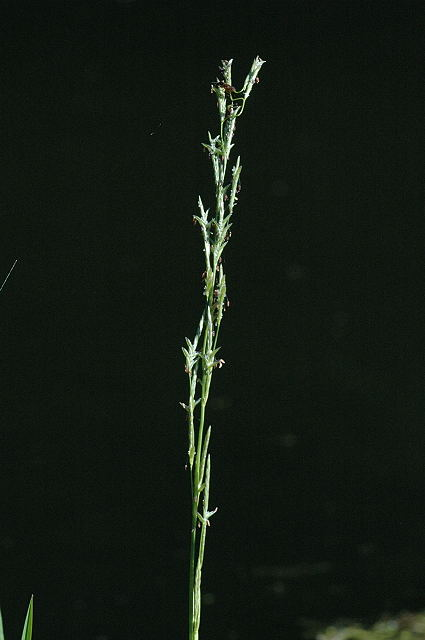

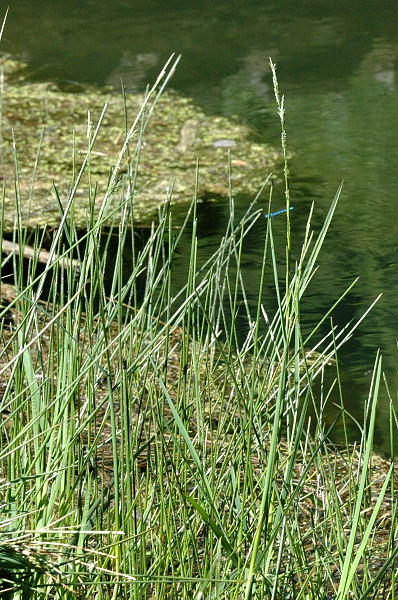

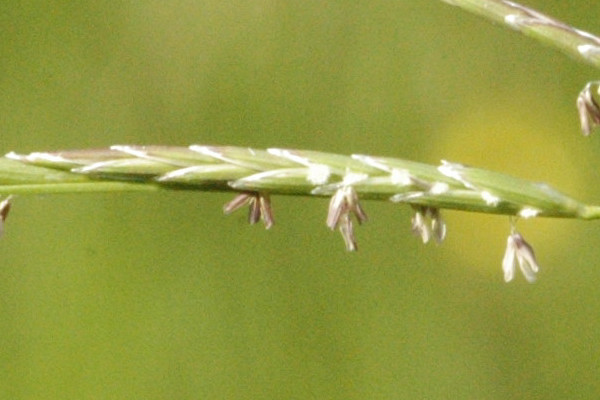

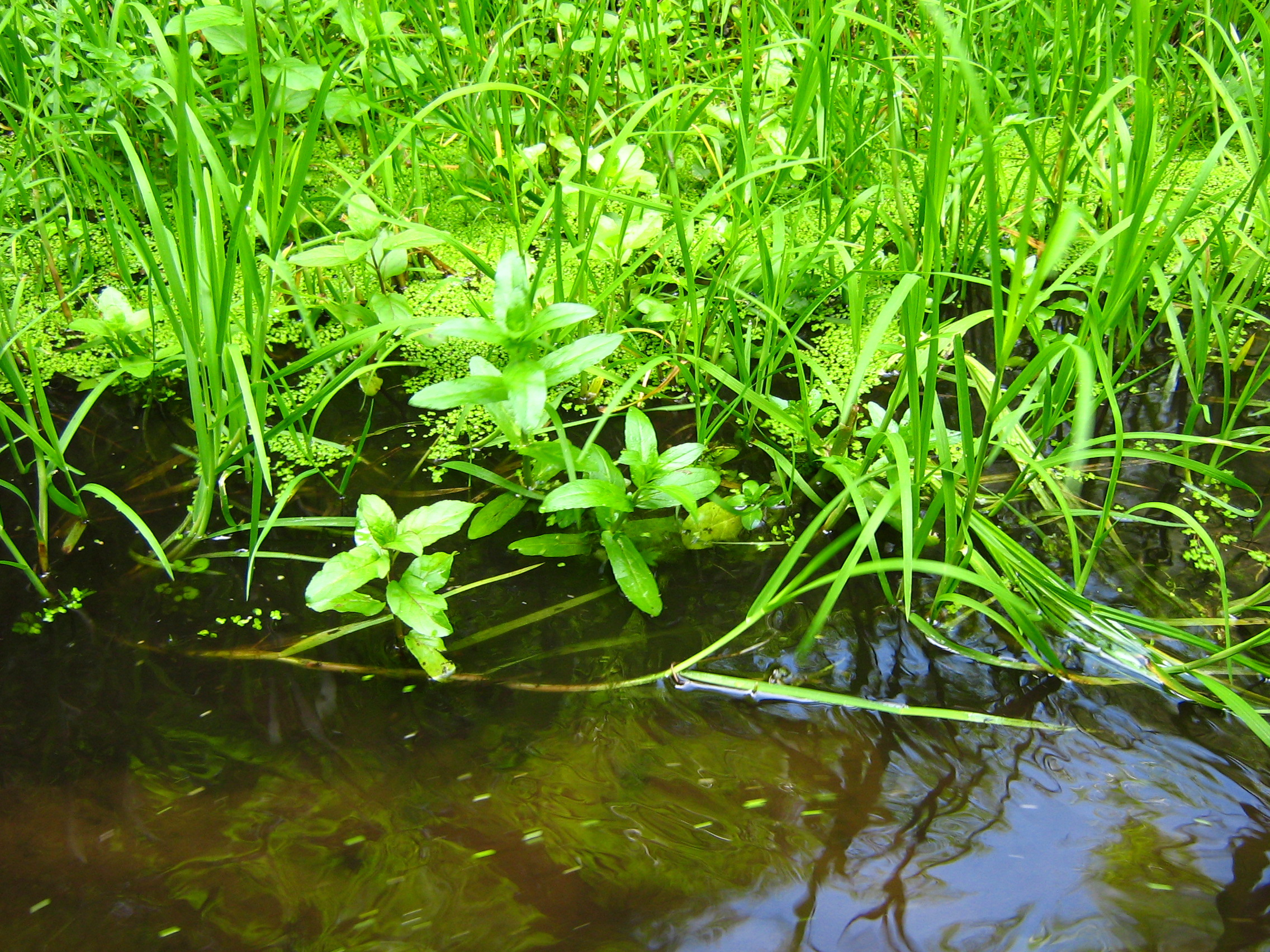
