= Torreyochloa erecta =

Scientific classification
- Kingdom: Plantae
- Clade: Tracheophytes
- Clade: Angiosperms
- Clade: Monocots
- Clade: Commelinids
- Order: Poales
- Family: Poaceae
- Subfamily: Pooideae
- Genus: Torreyochloa
- Species: T. erecta

Binomial name
- Torreyochloa erecta (Hitchc.) Church

Species of grass

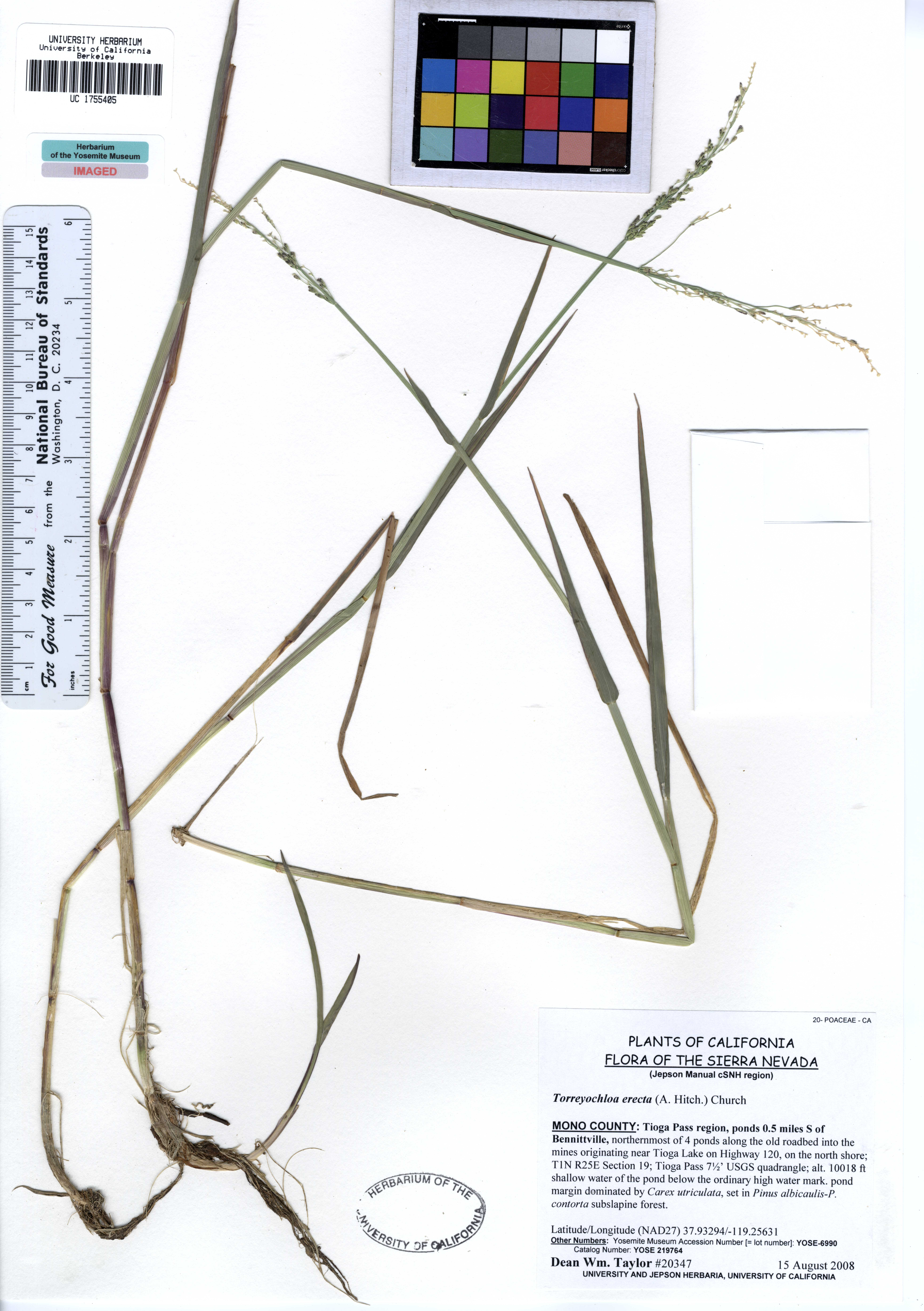

Torreyochloa erecta is a species of grass in the family Poaceae known by the common name spiked false mannagrass. It is native to the Cascade Range and Sierra Nevada ranges of the western United States, its distribution extending from California north into Oregon and east into Nevada. It grows in mountain forests and the margins of lakes and streams, at elevations above 2000 meters. It is a rhizomatous perennial grass producing thick, erect stems up to about 60 centimeters in maximum height. The inflorescence is a narrow panicle much longer than wide, containing wide, compressed spikelets containing 4 to 6 florets each.
