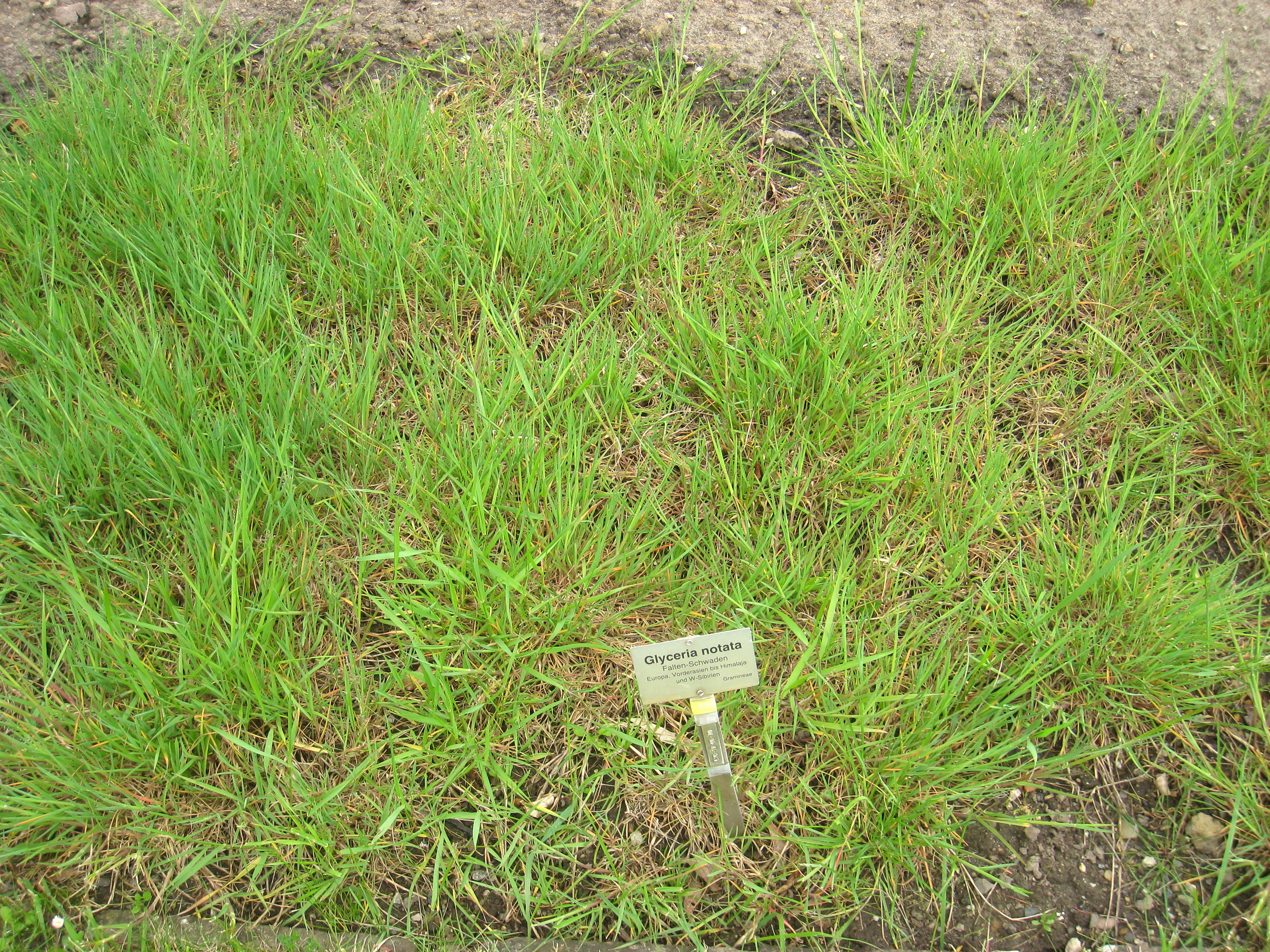

Scientific classification
- Kingdom: Plantae
- Clade: Tracheophytes
- Clade: Angiosperms
- Clade: Monocots
- Clade: Commelinids
- Order: Poales
- Family: Poaceae
- Subfamily: Pooideae
- Genus: Glyceria
- Species: G. notata

Binomial name
- Glyceria notata Chevall.

Synonyms
- Glyceria plicata (Fries) Fries

= Glyceria notata =

Species of grass

Glyceria notata, the plicate sweet-grass or marked glyceria, is a species of semi-aquatic true grass in the tribe Meliceae. It is from the cosmopolitan genus Glyceria (mannagrasses), a genus of tufted, perennial grasses. Its culms are 30–80 cm in height, ascending from a prostrate base, with dark- to bluish-green, flat or folded leaf-blades some 5–30 cm long by 3–14 mm wide.

It is known as invasive in some parts of the world.
