= Rosolina =

Rosolina Roxołina
- Comune
- Comune di Rosolina
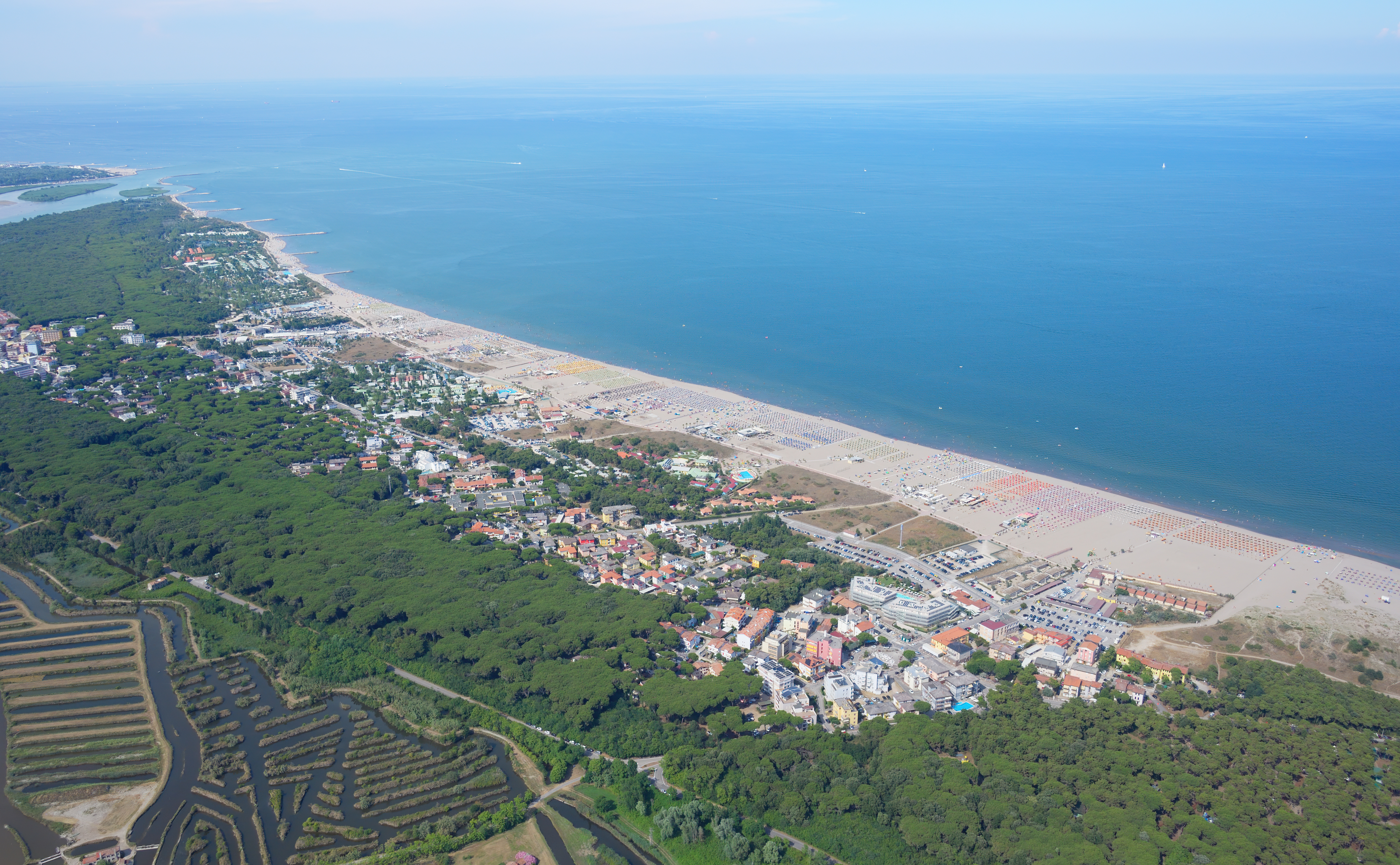
- Aerial view of Rosolina Mare

- Location within Italy Location within Veneto
- Coordinates: 45°4′N 12°14′E
- Country: Italy
- Region: Veneto
- Province: Province of Rovigo (RO)
- Frazioni: Isola di Albarella, Rosolina Mare

Area
  - Total: 73.1 km^{2} (28.2 sq mi)
- Elevation: 1 m (3.3 ft)

Population (Dec. 2004)
  - Total: 6,303
  - Density: 86.2/km^{2} (223/sq mi)
- Demonym: Rosolinesi
- Time zone: UTC+1 (CET)
  - Summer (DST): UTC+2 (CEST)
- Postal code: 45010
- Dialing code: 0426
- Website: Official website

Rosolina (Venetian: Roxołina) is a comune (municipality) in the Province of Rovigo in the Italian region Veneto, located about 40 kilometres (25 mi) south of Venice and about 35 kilometres (22 mi) east of Rovigo. As of 31 December 2004, it had a population of 6,303 and an area of 73.1 square kilometres (28.2 mi^{2}).

The municipality of Rosolina contains the frazioni (subdivisions, mainly villages and hamlets) Isola di Albarella and Rosolina Mare.

Rosolina borders the following municipalities: Chioggia, Loreo, Porto Viro.

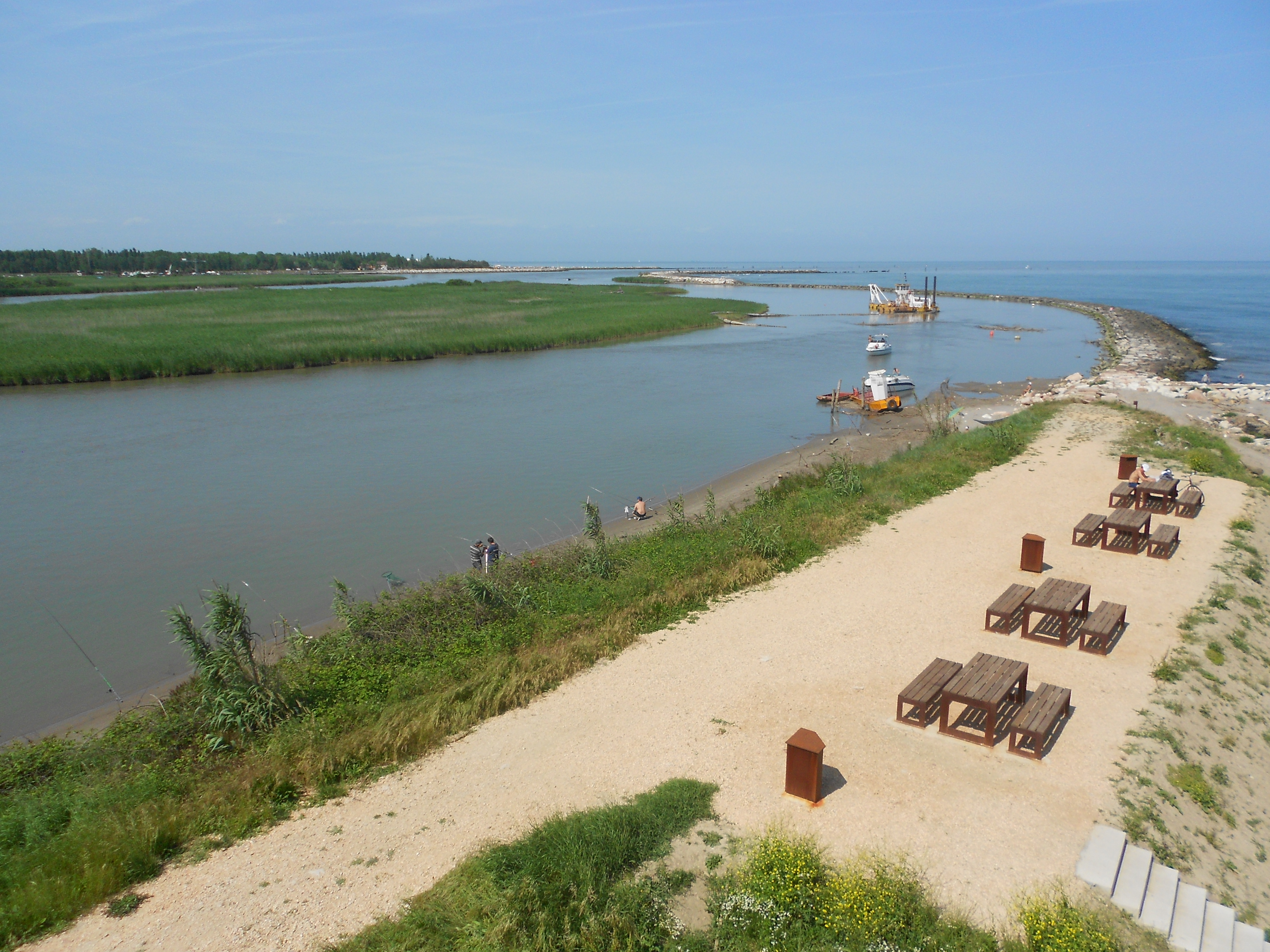
The mouth of the Adige at Rosolina Mare

== Demographic evolution ==
Historical population

Year	Pop.	±%
1861	?	—
1871	2,152	—
1881	2,346	+9.0%
1901	2,651	+13.0%
1911	3,296	+24.3%

Year	Pop.	±%
1921	3,809	+15.6%
1931	4,638	+21.8%
1936	5,135	+10.7%
1951	5,104	−0.6%
1961	4,320	−15.4%

Year	Pop.	±%
1971	4,912	+13.7%
1981	5,537	+12.7%
1991	5,675	+2.5%
2001	6,144	+8.3%

Source: Data from ISTAT

== Twin towns ==
Rosolina is twinned with:

- Taicang, China

== Points of interest ==
- Giardino Botanico Litoraneo di Porto Caleri, a regional nature preserve and botanical garden
