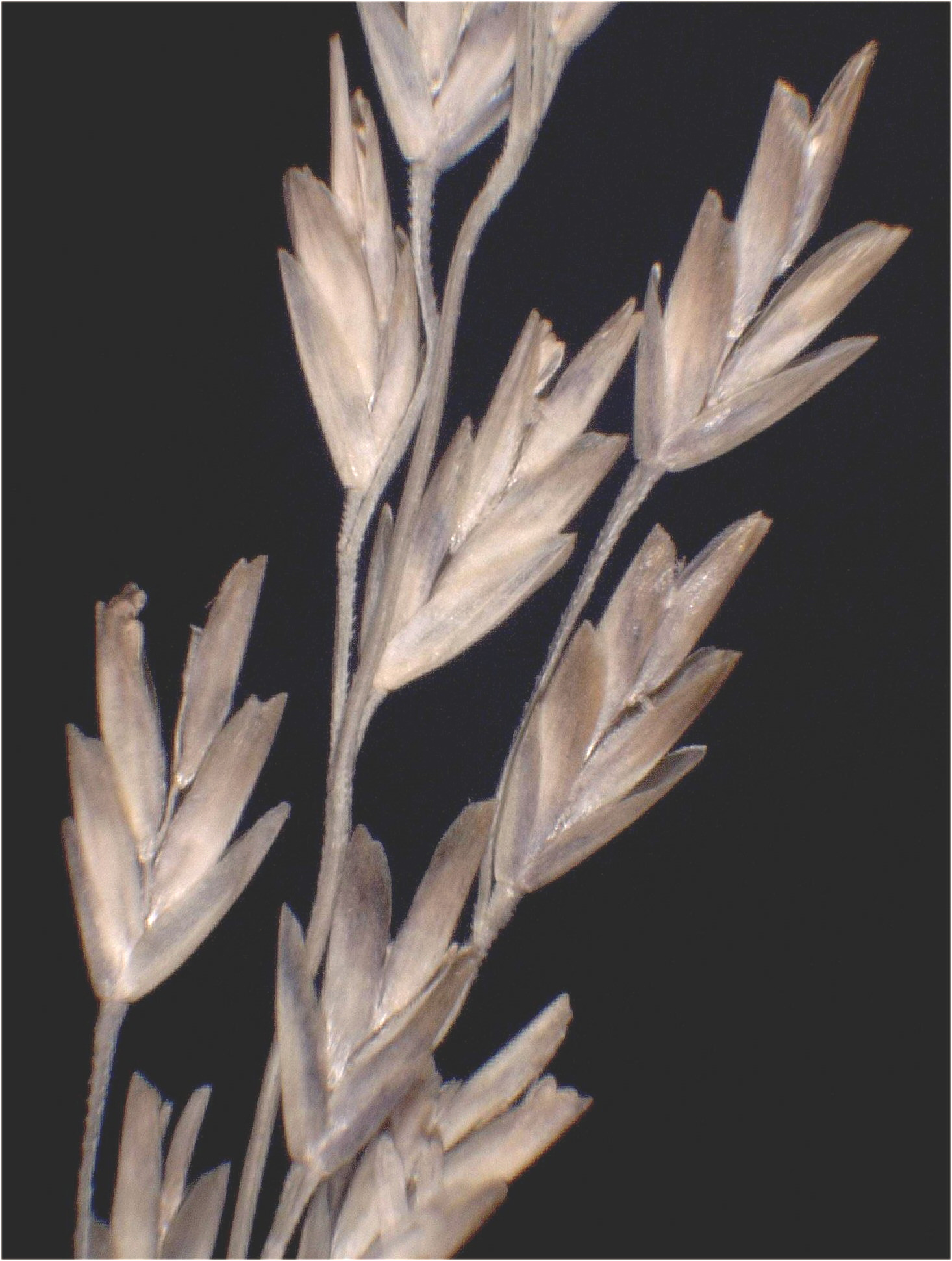

Scientific classification
- Kingdom: Plantae
- Clade: Tracheophytes
- Clade: Angiosperms
- Clade: Monocots
- Clade: Commelinids
- Order: Poales
- Family: Poaceae
- Subfamily: Pooideae
- Genus: Puccinellia
- Species: P. fasciculata

Binomial name
- Puccinellia fasciculata (Torr.) Bickn.

= Puccinellia fasciculata =

Species of plant

Puccinellia fasciculata, or Borrer's saltmarsh grass, is an annual grass native to coasts of Europe and introduced to the northern east coast of North America. Its diploid number is 28.

== Description ==
Puccinellia fasciculata is a coarse, annual grass growing 15–80 cm (5.9–31.5 in) high. Its leaf blades are 2–6 mm (0.079–0.236 in) wide and are typically flat, though leaves can curl inwards at their ends. Its ovoid or ellipsoid panicle is 2–16 cm (0.79–6.30 in) long, with ascending, somewhat scabrous floral branches floriferous almost to their base. Its spikelets are 3–4 mm (0.12–0.16 in) long and bear two to five flowers. The one-nerved first glume is 0.75 mm (0.030 in) long, and the three-nerved second glume is twice as long. Its ovate lemmas are 2–2.5 mm (0.079–0.098 in) long, are pubescent at their base, and become minutely serrulate at their tip. The palea are shorter, oblong, and erose at their tip. The anthers are 0.5–0.8 mm (0.020–0.031 in) long. The grass flowers from May to July.

Previously included in Puccinellia distans, P. fasciculata differs in its stouter and stiffer culms, being ascending or erect rather than decumbent as in P. distans. Its panicles are smaller and more narrow, its floral branches are floriferous nearly to their base, and its spikelets are more crowded and more coriaceous than in P. distans.

== Habitat and distribution ==
Puccinellia fasciculata prefers sandy and saline seashores from Nova Scotia to Virginia in North America, though it is native to Europe. It can also be found at a few individual sites in Arizona, Utah, and Nevada. All occurrences of the species in North America are likely introductions of the species to the region by humans.
