= Puccinellia howellii =

Conservation status
- Critically Imperiled (NatureServe)

Scientific classification
- Kingdom: Plantae
- Clade: Tracheophytes
- Clade: Angiosperms
- Clade: Monocots
- Clade: Commelinids
- Order: Poales
- Family: Poaceae
- Subfamily: Pooideae
- Genus: Puccinellia
- Species: P. howellii

Binomial name
- Puccinellia howellii J.I.Davis

Species of grass

Puccinellia howellii is a rare species of grass known by the common name Howell's alkaligrass. It is endemic to Shasta County, California, where it is known from a single population in Whiskeytown National Recreation Area near Whiskeytown. Its entire population is contained in a 1-acre (4,000 m^{2}) complex of three saline mineral springs directly next to Highway 299. The grass was first described to science in 1990 and no other populations were discovered despite extensive searches of the area.

The hillsides surrounding the salt springs where the rare grass grows burned in the 2018 Carr Fire. However the bare, wet gravel slopes of the springs were largely unburned and the Puccinellia population persists.

== Description ==
Puccinellia howellii is perennial bunchgrass, and grows in clumpy monotypic stands of stems up to 60 centimeters tall. The inflorescence is an array of branches a few centimeters long, the lower ones reflexed as the fruit matures. The grass reproduces only by seed, and seed is not produced until the individual is two years old or more. The plants are mostly dormant during warm months when the soil salinity is highest, and the seed germinates during wet seasons when water flow dilutes the salt.

The single population of the grass is made up of several thousand individuals, a dominant species of the vegetation in this tiny network of mineral springs. It grows alongside other halophytes such as saltgrass (Distichlis spicata) and seaside arrowgrass (Triglochin maritima).

== Endangered status ==
Threats to this already extremely rare grass include polluted surface runoff from the highway which is just steps away from its habitat, alterations in the specific moisture, pH, and salinity requirements of the plant season by season, and changes in the sediment amounts entering the habitat by water flow. In this habitat, freshwater is considered a pollutant, because it reduces the salinity too much for the grass to survive; management plans highlight the importance of diverting freshwater away from the springs.

Other threats include grazing by black-tailed deer (Odocoileus hemionus columbianus), garbage from the road, and random events that could affect the entire population.
