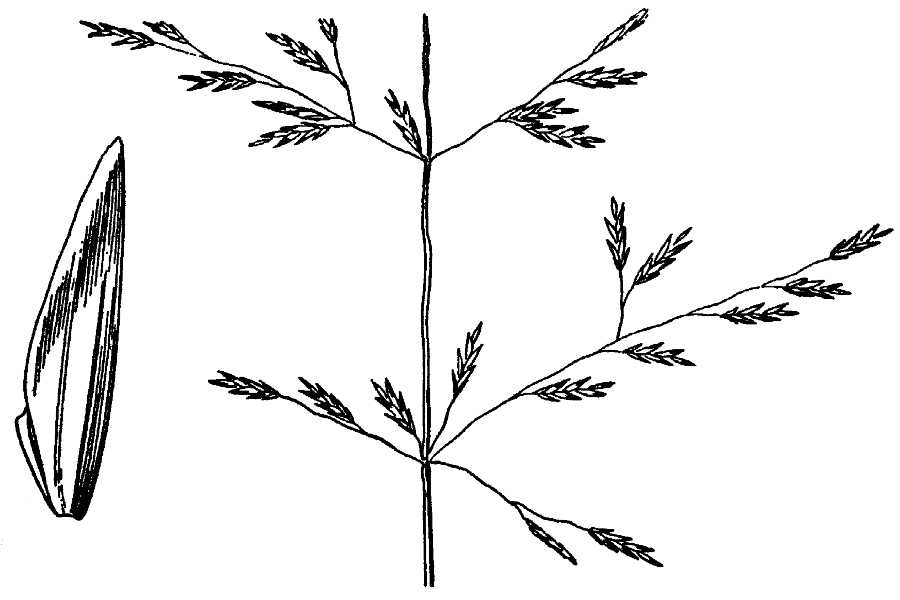

Scientific classification
- Kingdom: Plantae
- Clade: Tracheophytes
- Clade: Angiosperms
- Clade: Monocots
- Clade: Commelinids
- Order: Poales
- Family: Poaceae
- Subfamily: Pooideae
- Genus: Puccinellia
- Species: P. lemmonii

Binomial name
- Puccinellia lemmonii (Vasey) Scribn.

= Puccinellia lemmonii =

Species of grass

Puccinellia lemmonii is a species of grass known by the common name Lemmon's alkaligrass. It is native to western North America, particularly the northwestern United States, where it grows in moist, saline soils.

It is a perennial bunchgrass forming clumps of stems up to 40 centimeters in maximum height with narrow, almost hairlike leaves located around the bases. The inflorescence is a spreading array of a few branches containing rough-haired spikelets.
