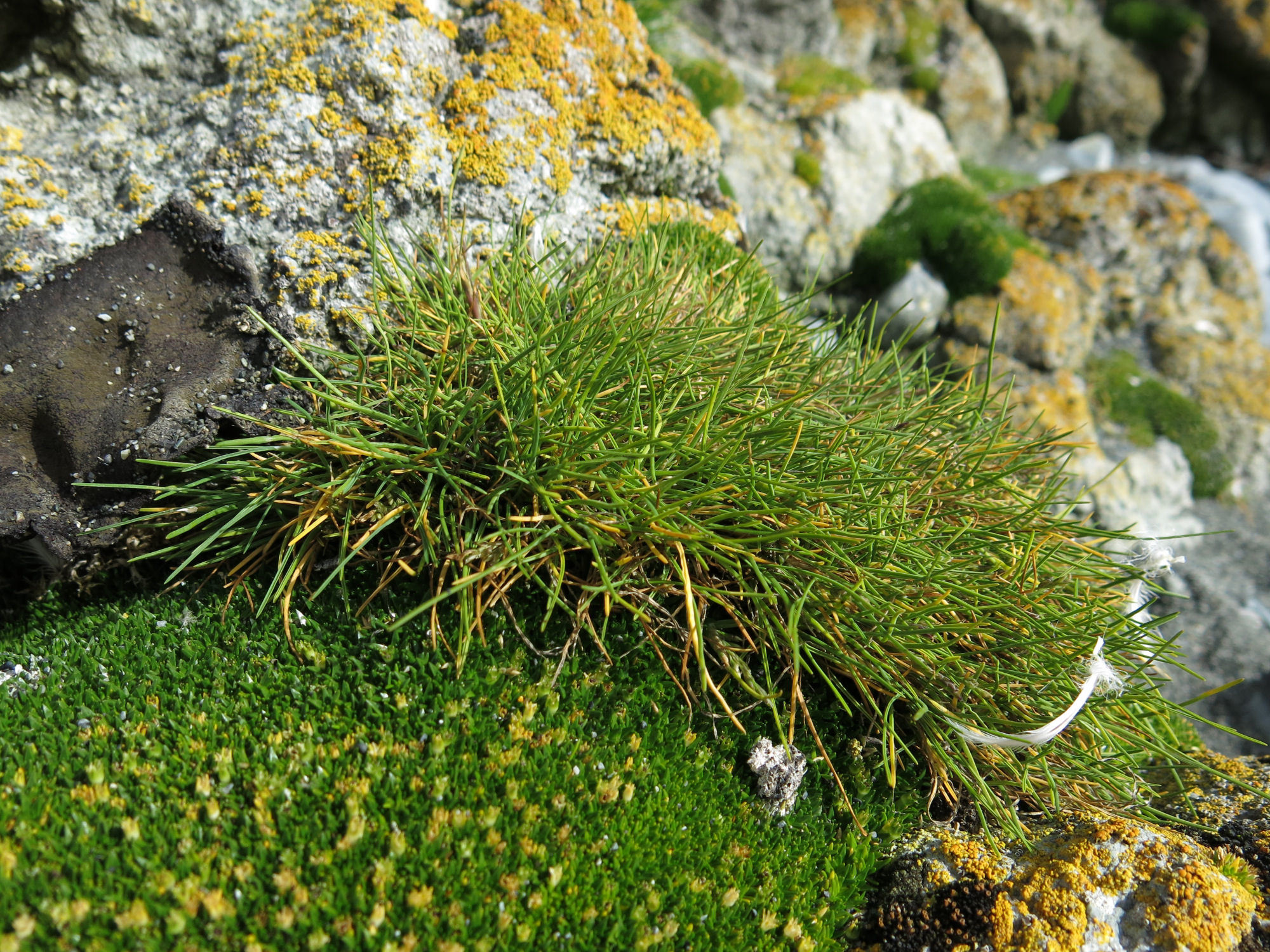

Scientific classification
- Kingdom: Plantae
- Clade: Tracheophytes
- Clade: Angiosperms
- Clade: Monocots
- Clade: Commelinids
- Order: Poales
- Family: Poaceae
- Subfamily: Pooideae
- Genus: Puccinellia
- Species: P. macquariensis

Binomial name
- Puccinellia macquariensis (Cheeseman) Allan & Jansen

Synonyms
- Triodia macquariensis

= Puccinellia macquariensis =

Species of grass

Puccinellia macquariensis is a species of salt-tolerant, perennial, tufted grass in the family Poaceae. It is endemic to Australia's subantarctic Macquarie Island in the Southern Ocean, though very closely related to P. chathamica of New Zealand's southern offshore islands. It grows to between 4 and 25 cm in height and is common in dense patches on coastal cliffs and stacks. It flowers from November to June.
