= Puccinellia parishii =

Conservation status
- Imperiled (NatureServe)

Scientific classification
- Kingdom: Plantae
- Clade: Tracheophytes
- Clade: Angiosperms
- Clade: Monocots
- Clade: Commelinids
- Order: Poales
- Family: Poaceae
- Subfamily: Pooideae
- Genus: Puccinellia
- Species: P. parishii

Binomial name
- Puccinellia parishii Hitchc.

Species of grass

Puccinellia parishii is an uncommon species of grass known by the common names bog alkaligrass and Parish's alkali grass. It is native to the western United States, where it is known from a few locations in Arizona and New Mexico, and one occurrence each in California and Colorado.

== Description ==
It grows in wet and seasonally wet habitat with alkali soils such as mineral springs. It is an annual bunchgrass with erect stems growing to 20 to 22 centimetres (7.9 to 8.7 in) in maximum height with very narrow, firm leaves around the bases. The inflorescence is a small array of a few narrow branches bearing spikelets.

It is an ephemeral grass, beginning to produce stems near the end of winter, flowering in early spring, dying and withering away by July.
