= Puccinellia phryganodes =

Scientific classification
- Kingdom: Plantae
- Clade: Tracheophytes
- Clade: Angiosperms
- Clade: Monocots
- Clade: Commelinids
- Order: Poales
- Family: Poaceae
- Subfamily: Pooideae
- Genus: Puccinellia
- Species: P. phryganodes

Binomial name
- Puccinellia phryganodes (Trin.) Scribn. & Merr.

Species of grass

Puccinellia phryganodes is a species of grass in the family Poaceae.

The native range of this species is Subarctic to Eastern Canada.
