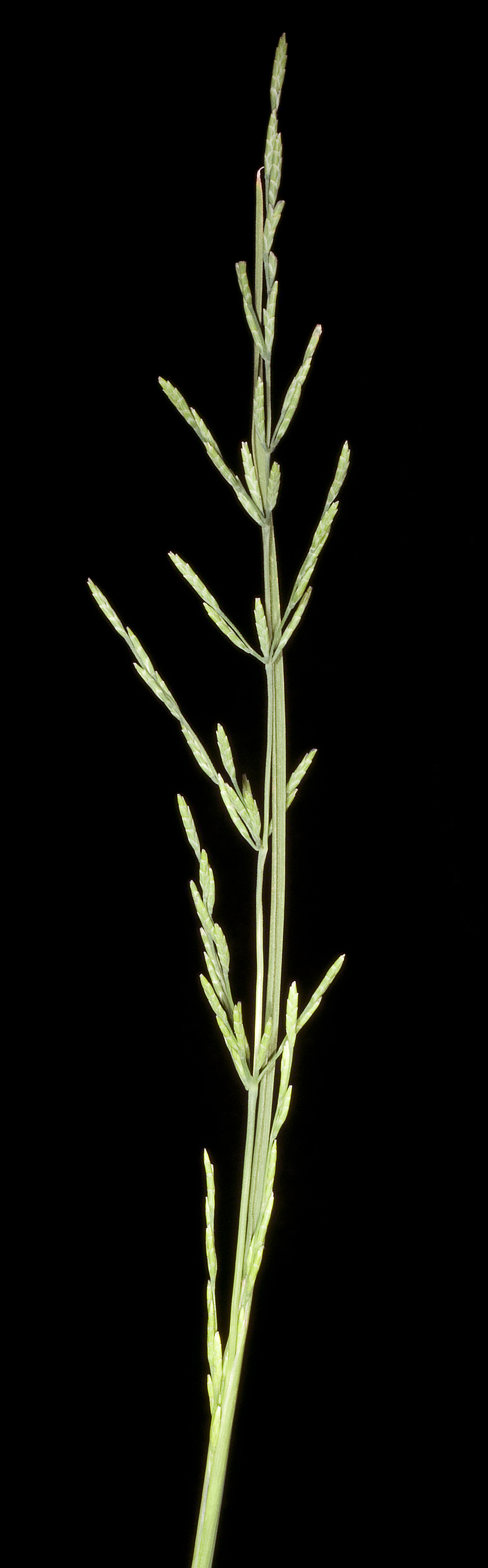

Scientific classification
- Kingdom: Plantae
- Clade: Embryophytes
- Clade: Tracheophytes
- Clade: Spermatophytes
- Clade: Angiosperms
- Clade: Monocots
- Clade: Commelinids
- Order: Poales
- Family: Poaceae
- Subfamily: Pooideae
- Genus: Puccinellia
- Species: P. stricta

Binomial name
- Puccinellia stricta (Hook.f.) C.H.Blom

= Puccinellia stricta =

Species of grass

Puccinellia stricta is a species of grass known by the common names Australian saltmarsh grass, and Marshgrass. It was first described by Joseph Dalton Hooker in 1853 as Glyceria stricta from a specimen collected at Akaroa, but was assigned to the genus, Puccinellia, in 1930 by Carl Hilding Blom. It is native to New Zealand and Australia, where it is found in Western Australia, South Australia, Victoria and Tasmania.

The species is very variable.

It is found on the outer margins of inland salt lakes, and on river and estuary margins.
