= Puccinellia pumila =

Scientific classification
- Kingdom: Plantae
- Clade: Tracheophytes
- Clade: Angiosperms
- Clade: Monocots
- Clade: Commelinids
- Order: Poales
- Family: Poaceae
- Subfamily: Pooideae
- Genus: Puccinellia
- Species: P. pumila

Binomial name
- Puccinellia pumila (Vasey) Hitchc.

Species of grass

Puccinellia pumila is a species of grass known by the common names dwarf akaligrass and smooth alkali grass. It is native to North America where it grows along the coastline in the northern latitudes, from Alaska across Arctic northern Canada to Greenland. It occurs on the coast of the Pacific Northwest in the United States and it is known from the Kamchatka Peninsula. The grass is only found on the coast, in wetland habitat, beaches, and areas inundated by the highest tides, in saline sand and mud. This perennial grass grows decumbent or erect to a maximum height near 40 centimeters, often remaining much smaller, especially in harsh habitat. It may root at stem nodes which become buried in wet substrate. The inflorescence is a dense or open array of branches bearing spikelets.

== Conservation status in the United States ==
It is listed as special concern and believed extirpated in Connecticut. and as historical in Rhode Island.
