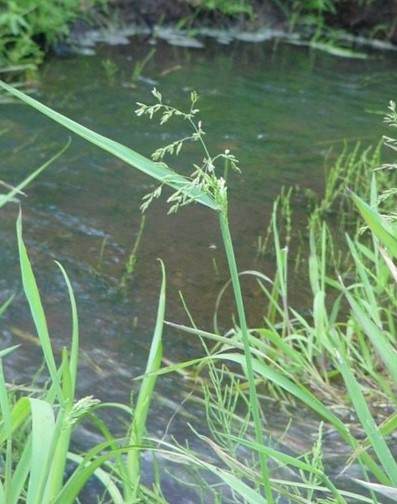
- Torreyochloa pallida

Scientific classification
- Kingdom: Plantae
- Clade: Tracheophytes
- Clade: Angiosperms
- Clade: Monocots
- Clade: Commelinids
- Order: Poales
- Family: Poaceae
- Subfamily: Pooideae
- Supertribe: Poodae
- Tribe: Poeae
- Subtribe: Torreyochloinae
- Genus: Torreyochloa; G.L.Church

Type species
- Torreyochloa pauciflora (J.Presl) Church

Synonyms
- Puccinellia sect. Torreyochloa (G.L. Church) R.T. Clausen

= Torreyochloa =

Genus of grasses

Torreyochloa is a genus of North American and northeast Asian plants in the grass family. False mannagrass is a common name for plants in this genus.

Species

- Torreyochloa erecta (Hitchc.) Church - western United States (CA NV OR)
- Torreyochloa fernaldii (Hitchc.) Church - Canada (all provinces except Alberta), United States (Northeast, Great Lakes)
- Torreyochloa natans (Kom.) Church - Japan, Russia (Amur, Kamchatka, Khabarovsk, Kuril, Primorye Sakhalin, Magadan)
- Torreyochloa pallida (Torr.) Church - Japan, Russia (Kamchatka, Sakhalin), Canada (Yukon + all 10 provinces), United States (primarily Northeast, Great Lakes, western mountains, Alaska).
- Torreyochloa pauciflora (J.Presl) Church - Canada (Yukon, British Columbia, Alberta), United States (AK CO ID MT OR WA WY SD AZ CA NV UT NM)
