= Puccinellia macra =

Scientific classification
- Kingdom: Plantae
- Clade: Tracheophytes
- Clade: Angiosperms
- Clade: Monocots
- Clade: Commelinids
- Order: Poales
- Family: Poaceae
- Subfamily: Pooideae
- Genus: Puccinellia
- Species: P. macra

Binomial name
- Puccinellia macra Fern. & Weath.

Species of grass

Puccinellia macra is a perennial grass which grows on the coasts of south-eastern Canada. Its specific epithet "macra" means large, referring to its tall stature.

== Description ==
Puccinellia macra is cespitose and grows 45–60 cm (18–24 in) tall. It has cauline leaves with thin, flat blades 3–6.3 mm (0.12–0.25 in) wide and 4–14 cm (1.6–5.5 in) long, with upper leaves typically longer than lower leaves. Its basal sheaths are somewhat purple. Its linear to cylindrical panicle is 20–30 cm (7.9–11.8 in) long, with appressed and very scabrous floral branches. Its purplish spikelets are 4–7 mm (0.16–0.28 in) long and bear four to six flowers. The first glume is 1.5–2 mm (0.059–0.079 in) long, hyaline, acute, and has one nerve, and its second glume is 2–2.5 mm (0.079–0.098 in) long, narrowly ovate, obtuse, and has three nerves. The oblanceolate palea is 2.5–3 mm (0.098–0.118 in) long and ciliate on its nerves, with lower cilia longer. The grass flowers in August.

P. macra is somewhat unique morphologically in its genus, resembling Puccinellia nutkaensis but differing in its softer and more pubescent lemmas.

== Habitat and distribution ==
Puccinellia macra grows on sea cliffs and in coastal sands in eastern Gaspé County in Quebec.
