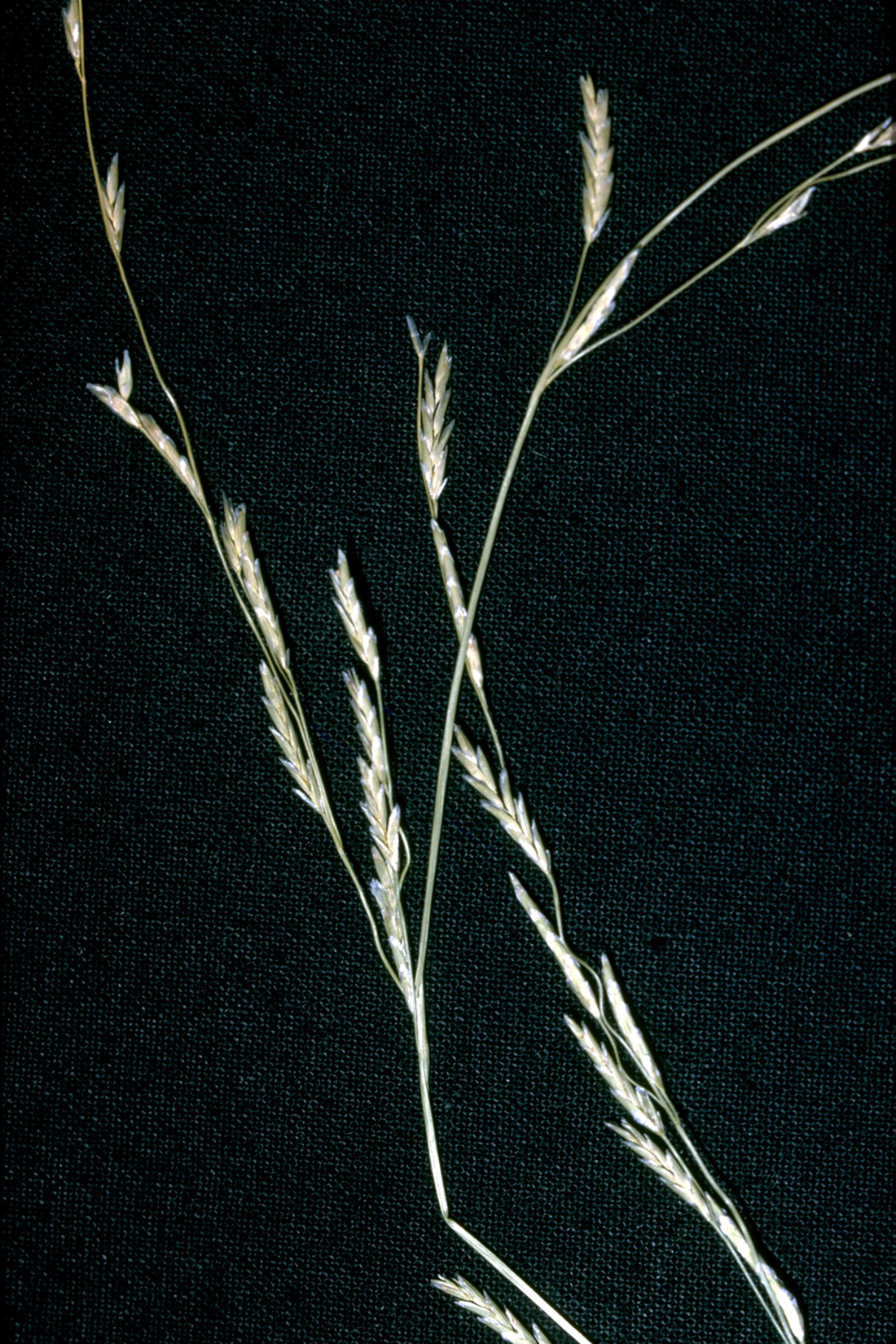

Scientific classification
- Kingdom: Plantae
- Clade: Tracheophytes
- Clade: Angiosperms
- Clade: Monocots
- Clade: Commelinids
- Order: Poales
- Family: Poaceae
- Subfamily: Pooideae
- Genus: Glyceria
- Species: G. borealis

Binomial name
- Glyceria borealis (Nash) Batch.

Synonyms
- Panicularia borealis

= Glyceria borealis =

Species of aquatic plant

Glyceria borealis is a species of Glyceria known by the common names northern mannagrass, boreal mannagrass, and small floating mannagrass. It is native to much of the northern half of North America, where it has a widespread distribution. This semiaquatic plant grows in wet areas in mountain forests, often in the water.

It grows a tall and very thin stem often exceeding a meter in height when erect. It may bend, lie flat on the ground, or float in the water of ponds and streams. The leaves bear ligules up to a centimeter long. The narrow, long inflorescence has cylindrical spikelets one to two centimeters long, each made up of 6 to 11 florets with membranous margins.
