= Puccinellia laurentiana =

Scientific classification
- Kingdom: Plantae
- Clade: Tracheophytes
- Clade: Angiosperms
- Clade: Monocots
- Clade: Commelinids
- Order: Poales
- Family: Poaceae
- Subfamily: Pooideae
- Genus: Puccinellia
- Species: P. laurentiana

Binomial name
- Puccinellia laurentiana Fern. & Weath.

Species of grass

Puccinellia laurentiana is a perennial grass which grows on gravelly seashores in south-eastern Canada. Its specific epithet "laurentiana" refers to the Gulf of St. Lawrence, where it grows.

== Description ==
Puccinellia laurentiana has solitary or somewhat tufted culms growing 10–30 cm (3.9–11.8 in) high. Its leaves are cauline with involute blades 3–6 cm (1.2–2.4 in) long. Basal leaf sheaths can be somewhat white. Its ligules are 1.5 mm (0.059 in) long and somewhat acute. Its panicle is 6–13 cm (2.4–5.1 in) long, with stiff and nearly glabrous floral branches. The branches are ascending. Its whitish spikelets are 4–6.5 mm (0.16–0.26 in) long with three to five flowers. The acute glumes are erose to serrulate; the first glume is 1–2 mm (0.039–0.079 in) long, narrowly ovate and acutish, with one nerve, and the second is 2–2.5 millimetres (0.079–0.098 in) long, broadly ovate and abruptly acute, with three nerves. The ovate lemmas are 2.3–2.8 mm (0.091–0.110 in) long and profusely pubescent on their lower nerves. The palea are lanceolate and scabrous above. The grass typically flowers from July into early August.

P. laurentiana resembles Puccinellia coarctata and Puccinellia vaginata, but differs from both in its abruptly acuminate whitish lemmas and stiff involute leaves. It additionally differs from P. coarctata in its lemmas' pubescent nerves.

== Habitat and distribution ==
Puccinellia laurentiana grows on gravelly seashores and sea cliffs in south-eastern Quebec and north-eastern New Brunswick, often on the Gulf of St. Lawrence for which it is named. It can rarely be found in Nova Scotia and Maine.
