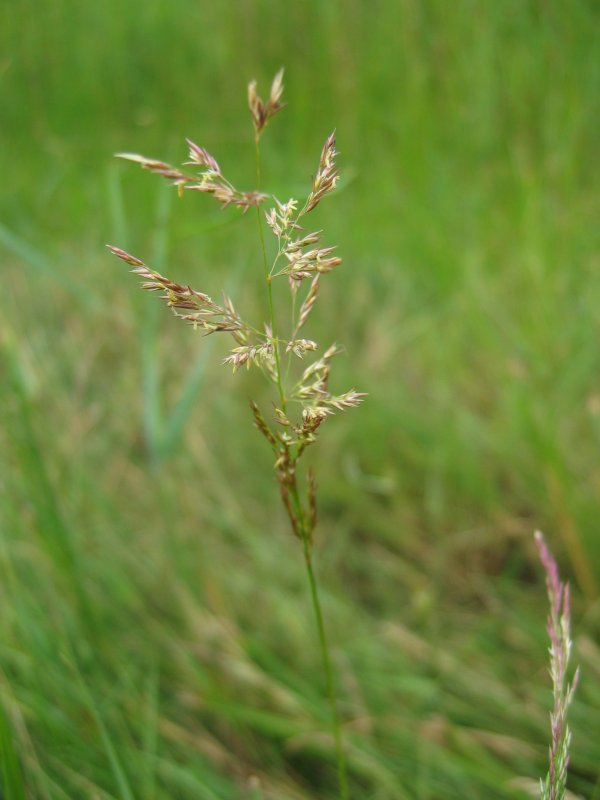
- Puccinellia distans " Weeping alkali grass "

Scientific classification
- Kingdom: Plantae
- Clade: Tracheophytes
- Clade: Angiosperms
- Clade: Monocots
- Clade: Commelinids
- Order: Poales
- Family: Poaceae
- Subfamily: Pooideae
- Supertribe: Poodae
- Tribe: Poeae
- Subtribe: Coleanthinae
- Genus: Puccinellia; Parl.

Type species
- Puccinellia distans (Jacq.) Parl.

Synonyms
- Atropis Rupr.; Pseudosclerochloa Tzvelev; Poa sect. Atropis Trinius

= Puccinellia =

Genus of grasses

Puccinellia is a genus of plants in the grass family, known as alkali grass or salt grass.

These grasses grow in wet environments, often in saline or alkaline conditions. They are native to temperate to Arctic regions of the Northern and Southern Hemispheres.

== Selected species ==
Puccinellia agrostidea Sorensen Bent alkali grass or tundra alkali grass
Puccinellia ambigua Sorensen - Alberta alkali grass
Puccinellia americana Sorensen - American alkali grass
Puccinellia andersonii Swallen - Anderson's alkali grass
Puccinellia angustata (R.Br.) Rand & Redf. - Narrow alkali grass
Puccinellia arctica (Hook.) Fern. & Weath. - Arctic alkali grass
Puccinellia bruggemannii Sorensen - Prince Patrick alkali grass
Puccinellia convoluta (Hornem.) Hayek -
Puccinellia coreensis Honda - Korean alkaligrass
Puccinellia deschampsioides Sorensen - Polar alkali grass
Puccinellia distans (Jacq.) Parl. - Spreading alkali grass, weeping alkali grass or reflexed saltmarsh-grass
Puccinellia fasciculata (Torr.) E.P.Bicknell - Torrey alkali grass or Borrer's saltmarsh-grass
Puccinellia fernaldii (A.Hitchc.) E.G.Voss = Torreyochloa pallida var. fernaldii
Puccinellia festuciformis (Host) Parl. -
Puccinellia groenlandica Sorensen - Greenland alkali grass
Puccinellia howellii J.I.Davis - Howell's alkali grass
Puccinellia hultenii Swallen - Hulten's alkali grass
Puccinellia interior Sorensen - Interior alkali grass
Puccinellia kamtschatica Holmb. - Alaska alkali grass
Puccinellia kurilensis (Takeda) Honda - Dwarf alkali grass
Puccinellia langeana (Berlin) T.J.Sorensen ex Hultén -
Puccinellia laurentiana Fern. & Weath. - Tracadigash Mountain alkali grass
Puccinellia lemmonii (Vasey) Scribn. - Lemmon's alkali grass
Puccinellia limosa (Schur) Holmb. -
Puccinellia lucida Fern. & Weath. - Shining alkali grass
Puccinellia macquariensis (Cheeseman) Allan & Jansen
Puccinellia macra Fern. & Weath. - Bonaventure Island alkali grass
Puccinellia maritima (Huds.) Parl. - Seaside alkali grass or common saltmarsh-grass
Puccinellia nutkaensis (J.Presl) Fern. & Weath. - Nootka alkali grass
Puccinellia nuttalliana (J.A.Schultes) A.S.Hitchc. - Nuttall's alkali grass
Puccinellia parishii A.S.Hitchc. - Bog alkali grass or Parish's alkali grass
Puccinellia perlaxa (N.G.Walsh) N.G.Walsh & A.R.Williams - Plains saltmarsh-grass
Puccinellia phryganodes (Trin.) Scribn. & Merr. - Creeping alkali grass
Puccinellia poacea Sorensen - Floodplain alkali grass
Puccinellia porsildii Sorensen - Porsild's alkali grass
Puccinellia pumila (Vasey) A.S.Hitchc. - Dwarf alkali grass
Puccinellia pungens (Pau) Paunero -
Puccinellia rosenkrantzii Sorensen - Rosenkrantz's alkali grass
Puccinellia rupestris (With.) Fern. & Weath. - British alkali grass or stiff saltmarsh-grass
Puccinellia simplex Scribn. - California alkali grass
Puccinellia stricta (Hook.f.) C.Blom - Australian saltmarsh-grass
Puccinellia sublaevis (Holmb.) Tzvelev - Smooth alkali grass
Puccinellia tenella Holmb. ex Porsild - Tundra alkali grass
Puccinellia tenuiflora (Griesb.) Scribn. & Merr. -
Puccinellia vaginata (Lange) Fern. & Weath. - Sheathed alkali grass
Puccinellia vahliana (Liebm.) Scribn. & Merr. - Vahl's alkali grass
Puccinellia wrightii (Scribn. & Merr.) Tzvelev - Wright's alkali grass

List sources :
