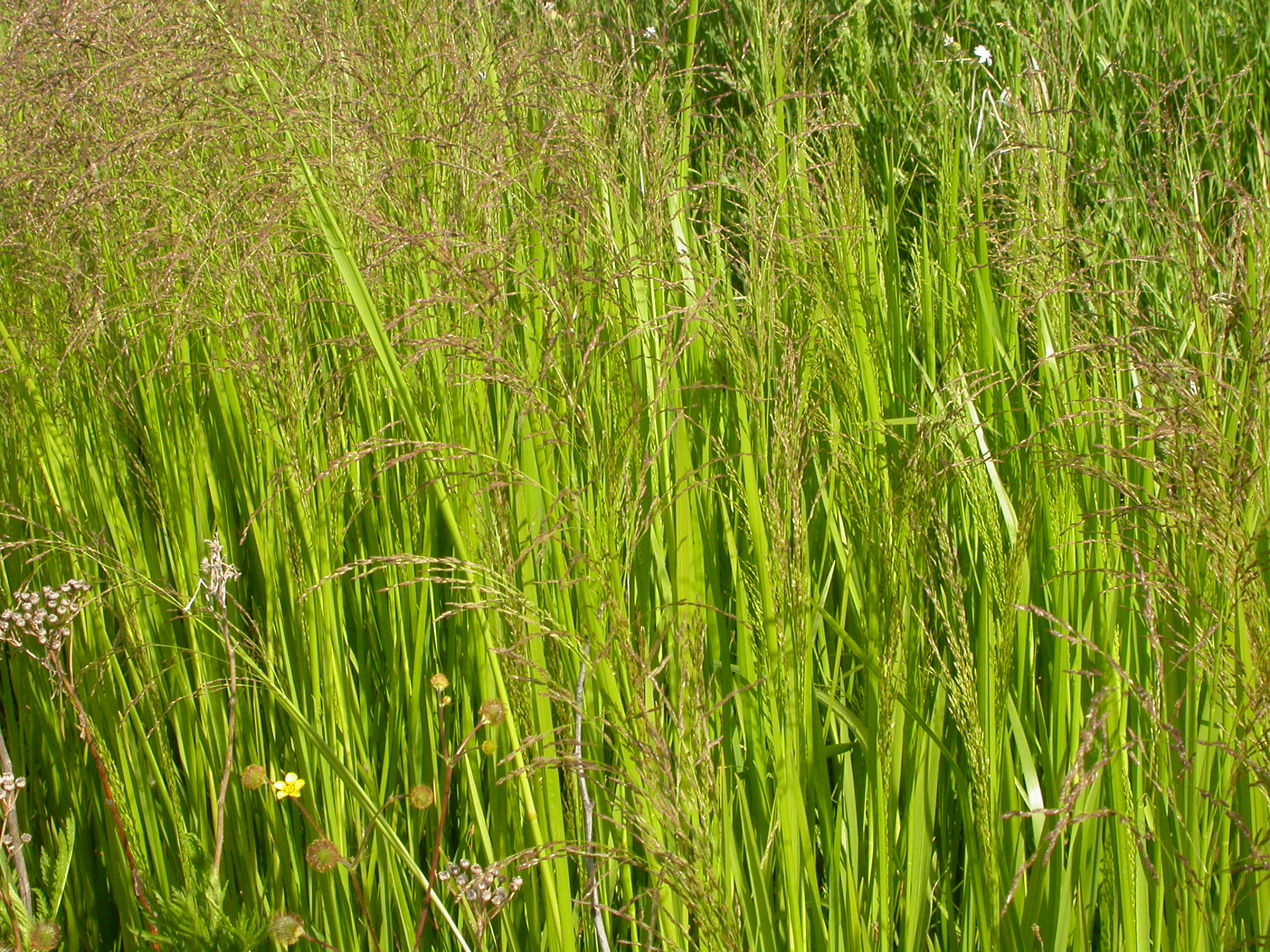

Scientific classification
- Kingdom: Plantae
- Clade: Tracheophytes
- Clade: Angiosperms
- Clade: Monocots
- Clade: Commelinids
- Order: Poales
- Family: Poaceae
- Subfamily: Pooideae
- Genus: Glyceria
- Species: G. grandis

Binomial name
- Glyceria grandis S.Wats.

= Glyceria grandis =

Species of aquatic plant

Glyceria grandis is a species of grass known by the common name American mannagrass. It is native to Canada and the United States, where it is widespread in distribution. It is most commonly found in wet areas such as riverbanks and ponds.

== Description ==
This is a rhizomatous perennial grass bearing thin stems which approach two meters in maximum height. The sturdy leaves each have a prominent central vein. The tops of the stems are occupied with spreading, multibranched inflorescences bearing many small, oval-shaped spikelets.
