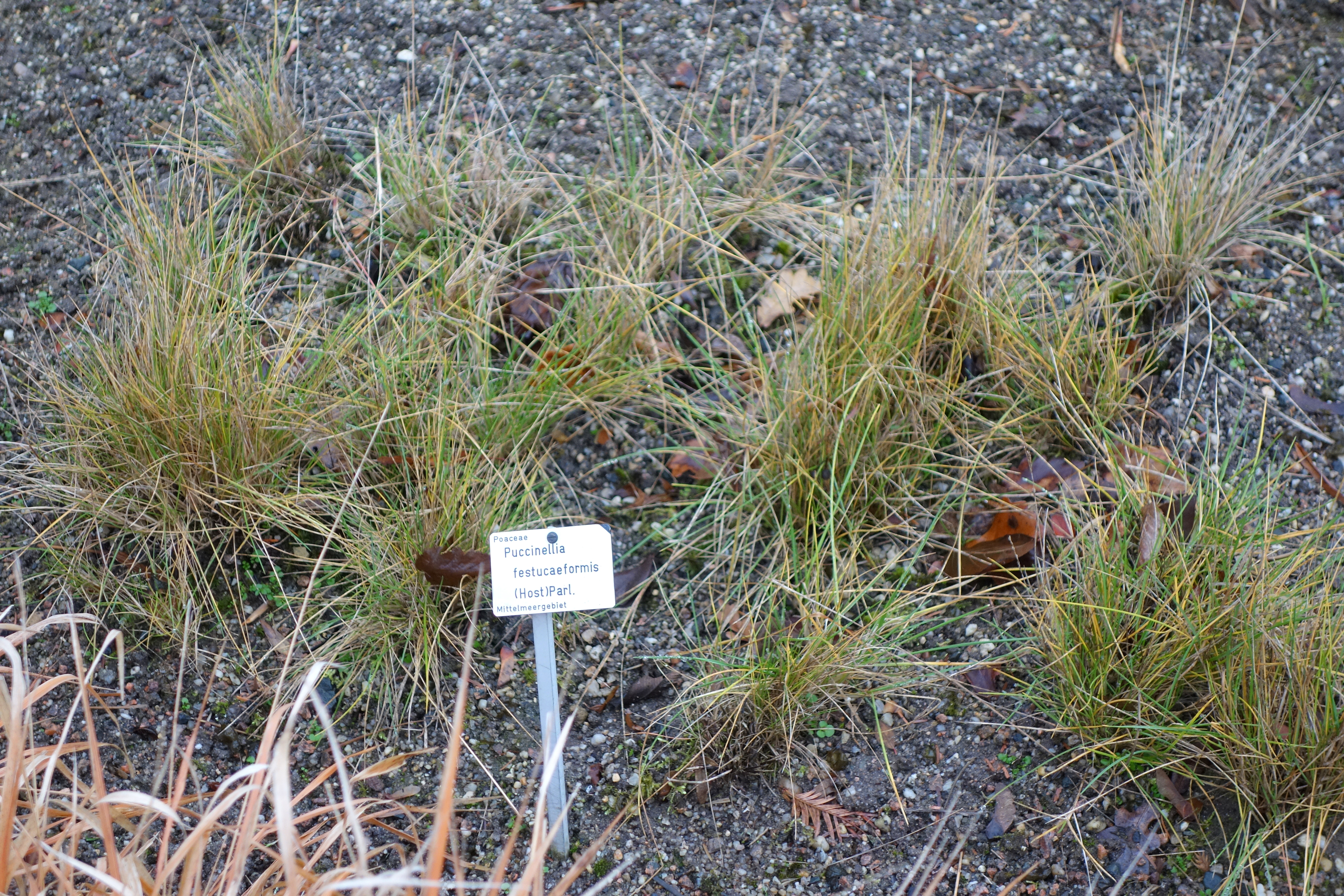

Scientific classification
- Kingdom: Plantae
- Clade: Tracheophytes
- Clade: Angiosperms
- Clade: Monocots
- Clade: Commelinids
- Order: Poales
- Family: Poaceae
- Subfamily: Pooideae
- Genus: Puccinellia
- Species: P. festuciformis

Binomial name
- Puccinellia festuciformis (Host) Parl.

= Puccinellia festuciformis =

Species of grass

Puccinellia festuciformis is a species of grass.

== Synonyms ==
- Atropis battandieri Speg.
- Atropis convoluta var. expansa (Crép.) Trab.
- Atropis convoluta var. tenuifolia (Boiss. & Reut.) Husn.
- Atropis distans var. festuciformis (Host) Coss. & Durieu
- Atropis festuciformis (Host) Schur
- Atropis festuciformis (Host) Richter
- Atropis festuciformis var. expansa (Crép.) Trab.
- Atropis palustris (Seenus) Beck
- Atropis palustris subsp. festuciformis (Host) Briq.
- Atropis palustris subsp. tenuifolia (Boiss. & Reut.) Jahan. & Maire
- Atropis rupestris Teyber
- Atropis tenuifolia (Boiss. & Reut.) K.Richt.
- Catabrosa festuciformis (Host) Link
- Festuca hostii Kunth
- Festuca palustris Seenus
- Glyceria convoluta subsp. festuciformis (Host) Douin
- Glyceria convoluta subsp. tenuifolia (Boiss. & Reut.) Douin
- Glyceria expansa Crép.
- Glyceria festuciformis (Host) Heynh. ex Rchb.
- Glyceria leptophylla Steud.
- Glyceria maritima var. palustris (Seenus) Fr.
- Glyceria palustris (Seenus) Lange
- Glyceria tenuifolia Boiss. & Reut.
- Phippsia palustris (Seenus) Á.Löve & D.Löve
- Poa festuciformis Host
- Poa halophila Schiede ex Steud.
- Poa mediterranea Chaub.
- Puccinellia battandieri (Speg.) Ponert
- Puccinellia caespitosa G.Monts. & J.M.Monts.
- Puccinellia distans var. fallax Maire
- Puccinellia distans subsp. festuciformis (Host) Maire & Weiller
- Puccinellia distans var. salina Fuss
- Puccinellia distans subsp. tenuifolia (Boiss. & Reut.) Maire & Weiller
- Puccinellia expansa (Crép.) Julià & J.M.Monts.
- Puccinellia festuciformis subsp. lagascana Julià & J.M.Monts.
- Puccinellia festuciformis subsp. tenuifolia (Boiss. & Reut.) W.E.Hughes
- Puccinellia palustris (Seenus) Grossh.
- Puccinellia palustris (Seen.) Podp.
- Puccinellia palustris subsp. festuciformis (Host) Maire
- Puccinellia stenophylla Kerguélen
- Puccinellia tenuifolia (Boiss. & Reut.) Andr.
- Puccinellia teyberi Hayek
- Sclerochloa festuciformis (Host) Britten & Rendle
