= Puccinellia nutkaensis =

Scientific classification
- Kingdom: Plantae
- Clade: Tracheophytes
- Clade: Angiosperms
- Clade: Monocots
- Clade: Commelinids
- Order: Poales
- Family: Poaceae
- Subfamily: Pooideae
- Genus: Puccinellia
- Species: P. nutkaensis

Binomial name
- Puccinellia nutkaensis (J.Presl) Fernald & Weath.

Species of grass

Puccinellia nutkaensis is a species of grass known by the common names Nootka alkaligrass and Alaska alkali grass. It is native to North America from Alaska across northern Canada to Greenland and Nova Scotia, and down to Washington to Oregon to the Central Coast of California.

== Description ==
Puccinellia nutkaensis is a perennial bunchgrass which is quite variable in appearance, taking a petite, clumpy form or growing erect to 90 centimeters in height with robust inflorescences. It sometimes roots at stem nodes that become buried in moist substrate, and forms dense stands.

A species of leafhopper, Macrosteles fascifrons, is associated with this grass in Alaska, remaining on the grass even when it is submerged amid icebergs.

== Habitat ==
It is a plant of the coastline in wet areas with rocky, sandy saline soils. A halophyte, the grass is used for revegetation of salt marshes and other habitat in the intertidal zone in Alaska, where it is valuable for its tolerance of heavy inundation in cold saltwater during high tides and storm surges.
