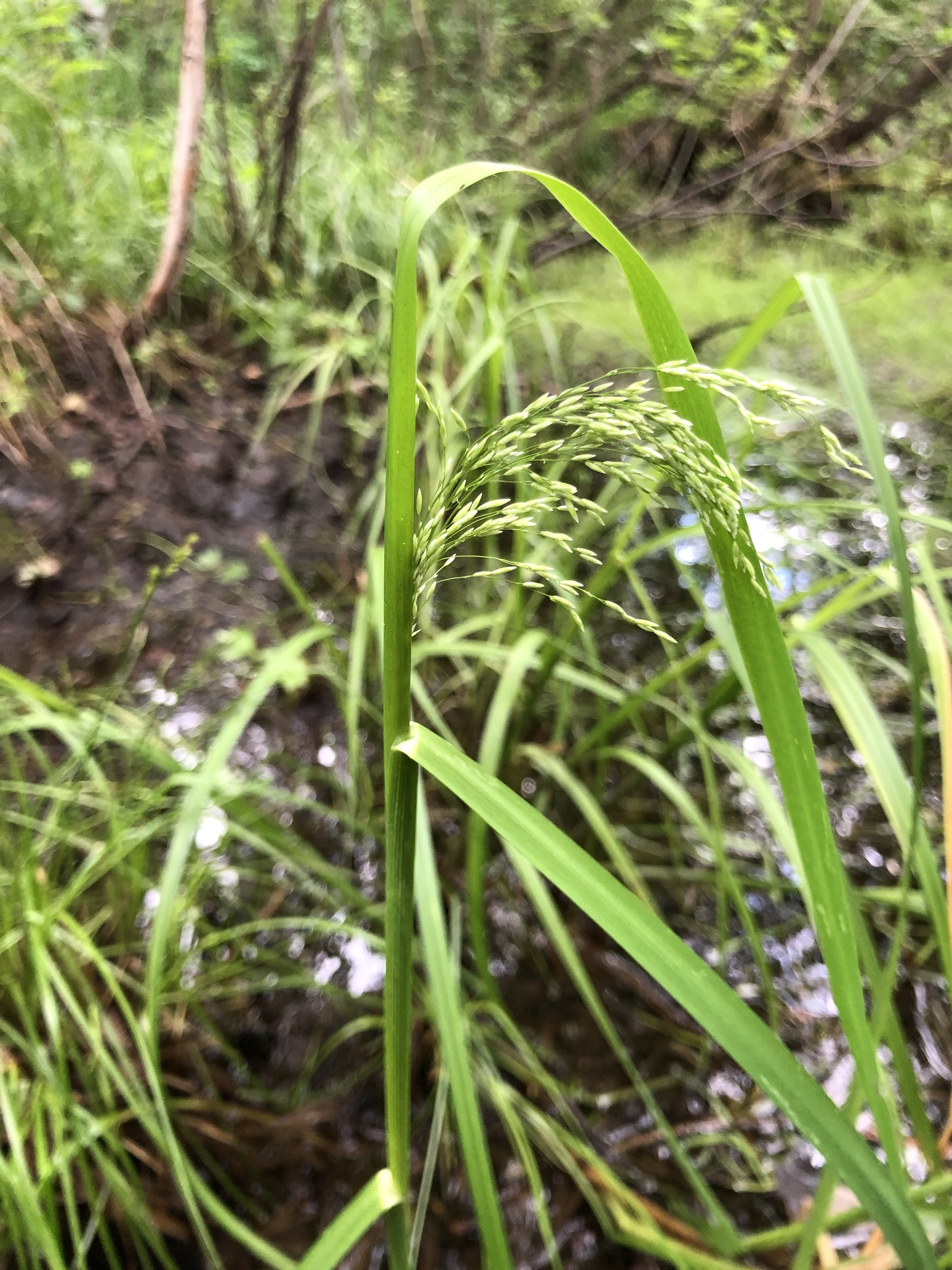

Scientific classification
- Kingdom: Plantae
- Clade: Tracheophytes
- Clade: Angiosperms
- Clade: Monocots
- Clade: Commelinids
- Order: Poales
- Family: Poaceae
- Subfamily: Pooideae
- Genus: Glyceria
- Species: G. lithuanica

Binomial name
- Glyceria lithuanica (Gorski) Gorski

= Glyceria lithuanica =

Species of grass

Glyceria lithuanica is a species of grass in the family Poaceae.

It is native to Eurasia.
