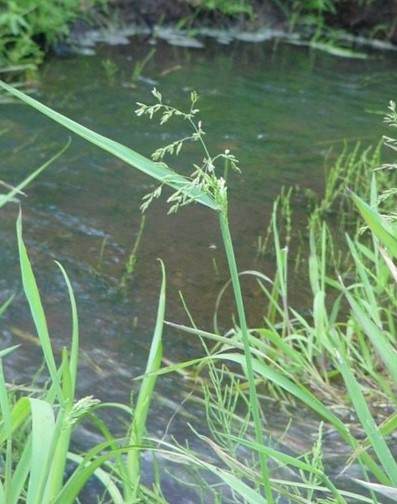

Scientific classification
- Kingdom: Plantae
- Clade: Tracheophytes
- Clade: Angiosperms
- Clade: Monocots
- Clade: Commelinids
- Order: Poales
- Family: Poaceae
- Subfamily: Pooideae
- Genus: Torreyochloa
- Species: T. pallida

Binomial name
- Torreyochloa pallida (Torr.) G.L.Church

Synonyms
- Glyceria pallida; Puccinellia pallida

= Torreyochloa pallida =

Species of grass

Torreyochloa pallida is a species of grass known by the common names pale false mannagrass and weak manna grass. It is native to North America, especially the east and west sides. It grows in wet habitat, such as rivers, lakesides, bogs, and swamps. It is a rhizomatous perennial grass producing thick, erect to decumbent, sometimes matted stems which can easily exceed one meter in maximum length. The inflorescence is a branching panicle up to 25 centimeters long by 12 wide containing compressed spikelets with up to 8 florets each.

There are three varieties of this grass which are distinguished by appearance and distribution.
