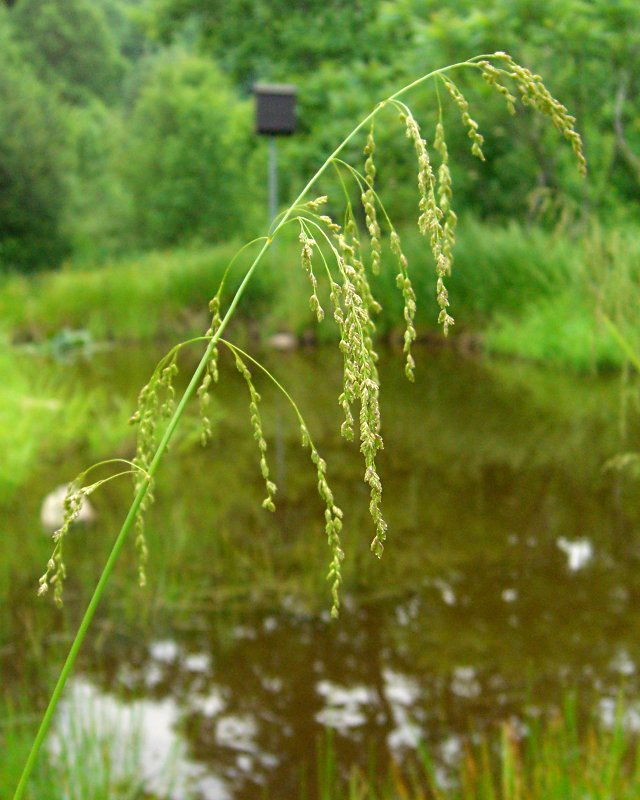

Conservation status
- Least Concern (IUCN 3.1)

Scientific classification
- Kingdom: Plantae
- Clade: Tracheophytes
- Clade: Angiosperms
- Clade: Monocots
- Clade: Commelinids
- Order: Poales
- Family: Poaceae
- Subfamily: Pooideae
- Genus: Glyceria
- Species: G. striata

Binomial name
- Glyceria striata (Lam.) Hitchc.

= Glyceria striata =

Species of flowering plant

Glyceria striata is a species of Glyceria which is known by the common names fowl mannagrass and ridged glyceria. It is native to much of North America, from Alaska and northern Canada to northern Mexico.

It is a common bunchgrass species found in wet areas, often in forests.

Glyceria striata bears erect stems exceeding a meter in maximum height and firm, narrow leaves. The spreading branches of the inflorescence hold oval-shaped to nearly round spikelets each with generally fewer than six florets.
