= Akuliaruseq =

Akuliaruseq may refer to the following landforms in Greenland, from north to south:

- Akuliaruseq Island, an island in the southern part of Upernavik Archipelago
- Akuliaruseq Peninsula, a mainland peninsula in the Uummannaq Fjord region
- Akuliaruseq, Kujalleq, a village of Kujalleq municipality
- Akuliaruseq (mountain), a mountain in Greenland
