= Qaarsorsuaq Island =

Uninhabited island in northwestern Greenland

Qaarsorsuaq
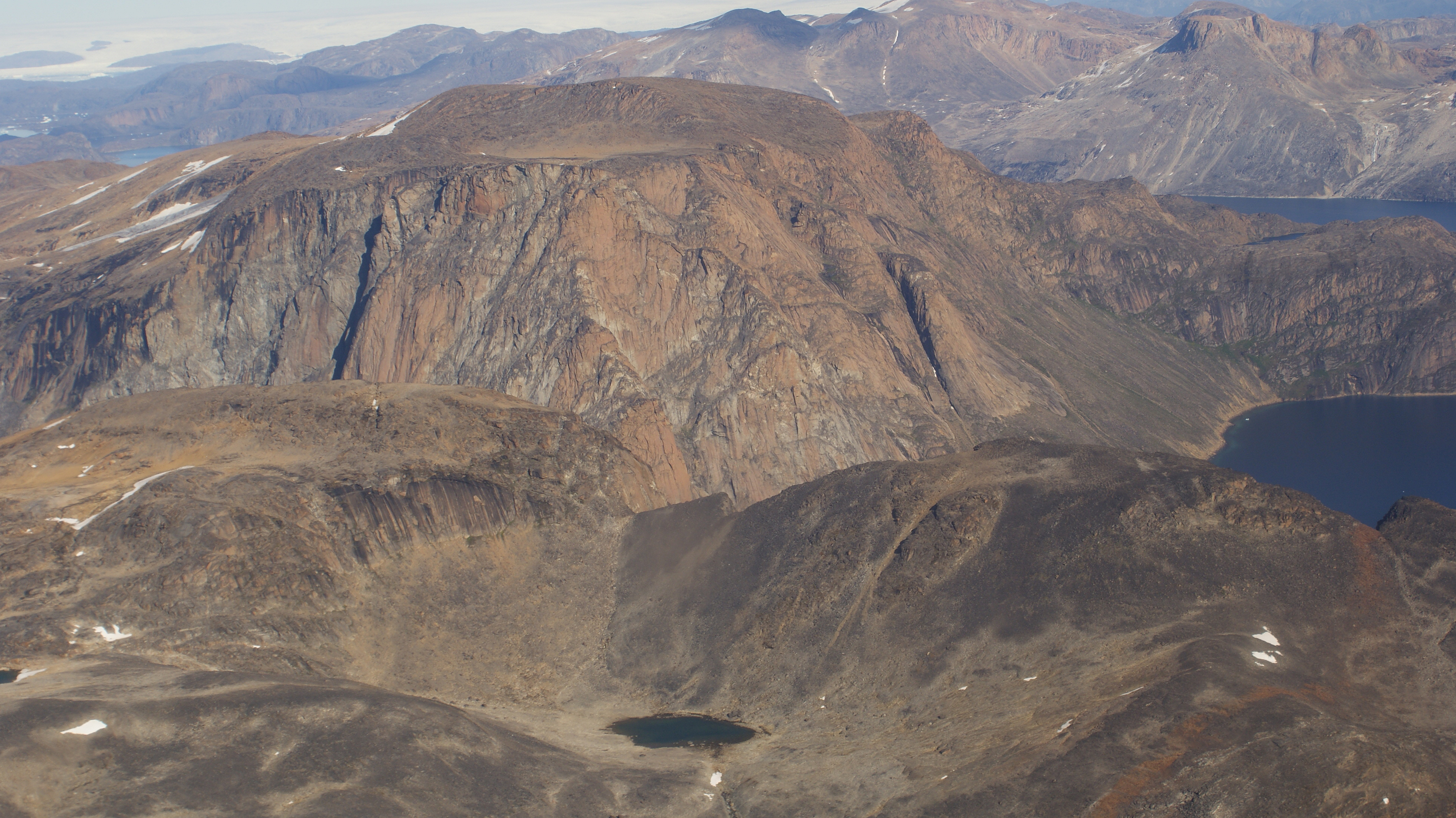
- Aerial view of Qaarsorsuaq Island

- Location within Greenland

Geography
- Location: Greenland
- Coordinates: 72°43′N 55°56′W
- Archipelago: Upernavik Archipelago
- Area: 124.7 km^{2} (48.1 sq mi)
- Length: 14.83 km (9.215 mi)
- Width: 17.6 km (10.94 mi)
- Coastline: 67.6 km (42 mi)
- Highest elevation: 1,042 m (3419 ft)
- Highest point: Sandersons Hope

Administration
- Greenland
- Municipality: Avannaata

Qaarsorsuaq Island (old spelling: Qaerssorsuaq) is an uninhabited island in Avannaata municipality in northwestern Greenland. At 124.7 km^{2} (48.1 mi^{2}), it is one of the largest islands in the Upernavik Archipelago, located in its southern part. The name of the island means "a large rock surface" in the Greenlandic language.

== Geography ==
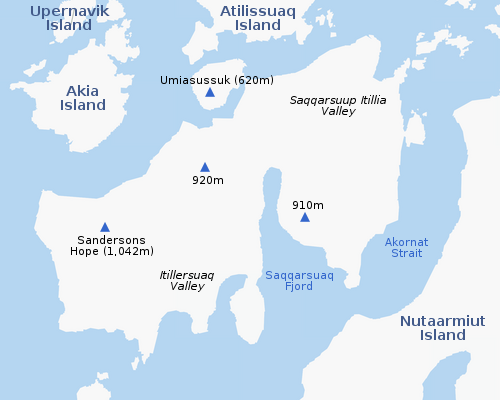
Map of the island

=== Location within the archipelago ===
Qaarsorsuaq Island is located in the outer belt of islands in the Upernavik Archipelago, in the group between the Upernavik Icefjord in the north, and Nunavik Peninsula in the south, approximately 7 km (4.3 mi) to the southeast of Upernavik town, from which it is separated by the smaller Akia Island.

In the north, the Torsuut strait separates it from Atilissuaq Island, and several skerries. In the northeast, small, low islands of Tapeq, Qeqertat, and Nunaa separate the island from the larger Aappilattoq Island, home to the Aappilattoq settlement. In the east and southeast, Qaarsorsuaq Island is separated from the large Nutaarmiut Island by the Akornat Strait.

=== Coastline ===
The island has a complicated shoreline, with several small bay and inlet indentations. The largest inlet is the Saqqarsuaq Fjord in the south.

==== Promontories ====
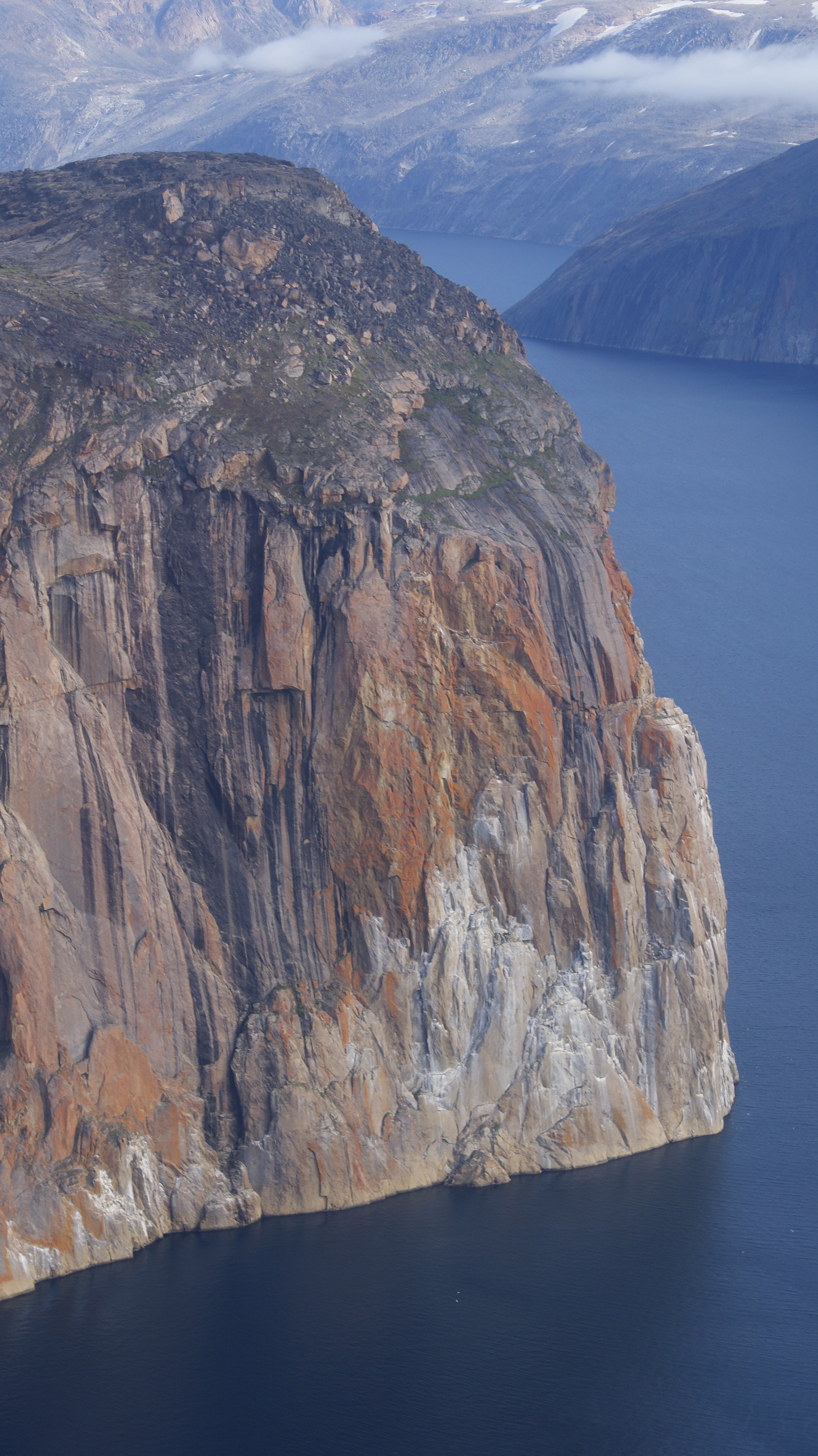
Aerial view of the cliff of Apparsuit (central-southern cape), jutting into Akornat Strait

Due to the complicated shoreline the island has a number of promontories, some of which bear identical names, such as Qoornoq and Apparsuit. The names: rock surface and rock fall (or rock wall), respectively, refer to the landform shapes of the promontories, and are very common in the archipelago.

Name	Direction	Latitude N	Longitude W
Naujannguaq	Northern Cape	72°46′57″	55°43′15″
Qoornoq (north)	Eastern Cape	72°44′34″	55°38′41″
Qoornoq (south)	Southeastern Cape	72°40′46″	55°45′00″
Apparsuit (Akornat Strait)	Central-southern Cape	72°39′24″	55°52′55″
Qaarsoq	Southern Cape	72°38′55″	56°01′46″
Inngia	Southwestern Cape	72°39′45″	56°08′46″
Apparsuit (Baffin Bay)	Western Cape	72°42′15″	56°10′52″

=== Mountains ===
The island is mountainous throughout, with several distinct summits. The highest point on the island is the summit of the Sandersons Hope mountain in the western part of the island, at 1,042 m (3,418.6 ft). Via a small isthmus in the north, the island is connected with an otherwise standalone mountain, the flooded peak of Umiasussuk, the trapezoid shape of which is the landmark of Upernavik town, visible from the Upernavik Airport and the entire eastern and northern coast of Upernavik Island.

=== Valleys ===
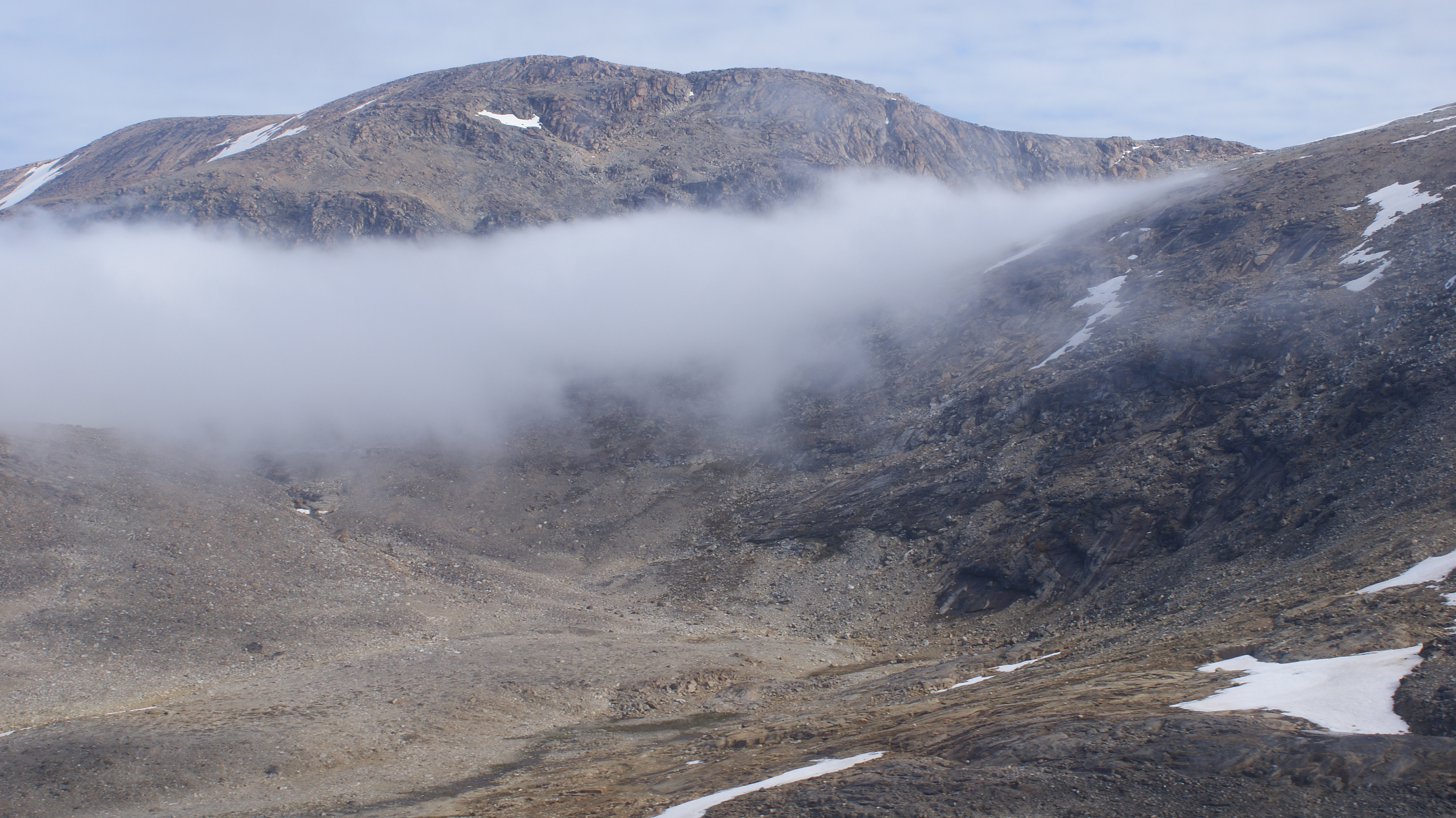
Aerial view of the Itillersuaq valley in the interior of the island

There are two significant valleys on the island. Saqqarsuup Itillia (old spelling: Sarqarssûp itivdlia) dissects the eastern part of the island into two separate massifs, the southern topping at a 910 m (2,990 ft) peak, and the northern topping at 470 m (1,540 ft) peak, to the east of the Umiasussuk mountain. The valley holds a small lake of the same name.

The southwestern coast is home to several small lakes, most of which are in the north–south oriented Itillersuaq (old spelling: Itivdlerssuaq) valley, through which leads a walking trail. The name of the valley means "a crossing point between two fjords" in the Greenlandic language.
