= Umiasussuk =

Mountain in Greenland

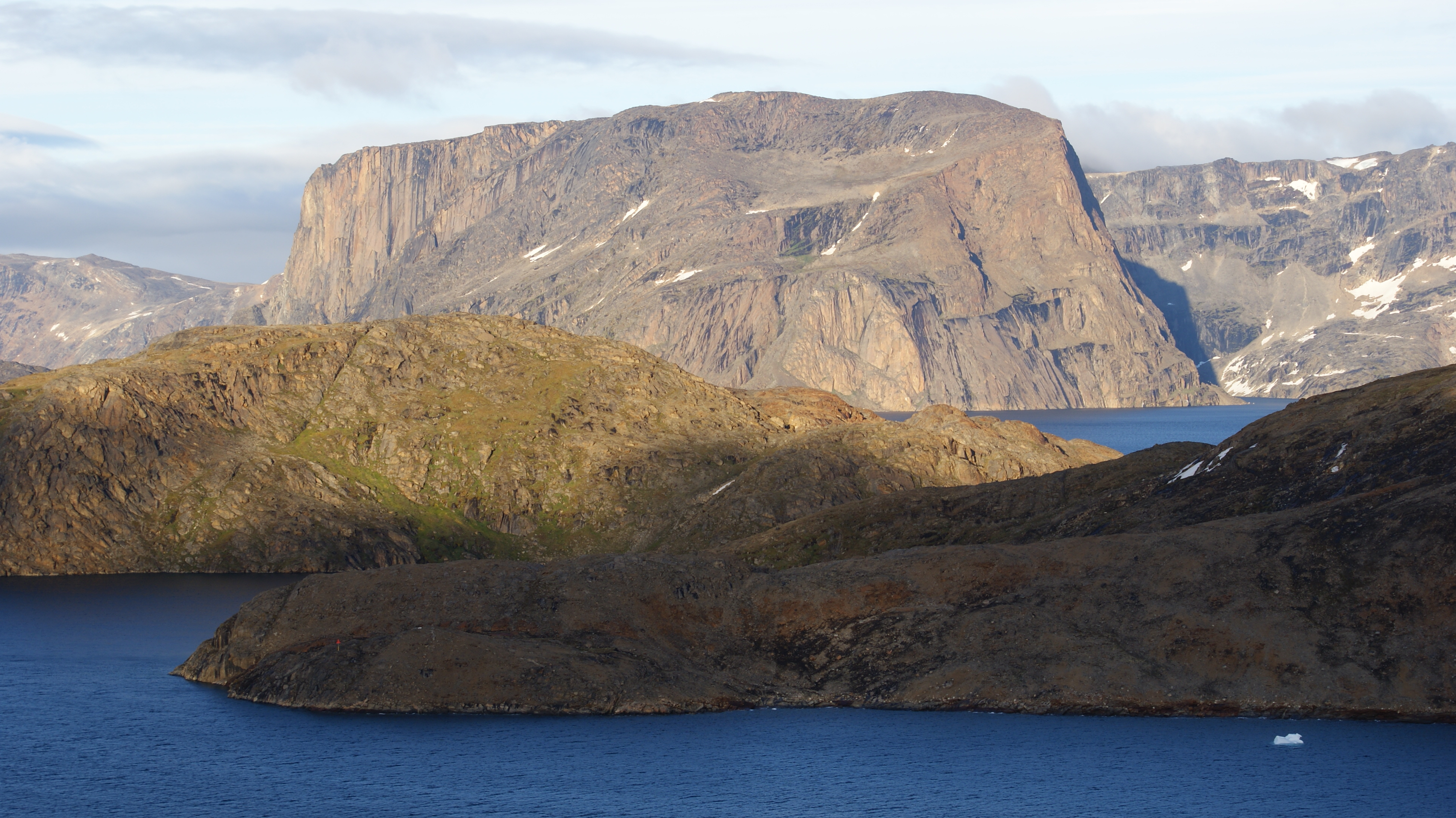
- Umiasussuk seen from the northwest, from Upernavik Island

Highest point
- Elevation: 620 m (2,030 ft)
- Prominence: 620 m (2,030 ft)
- Coordinates: 72°45′39″N 55°56′25″W

Geography
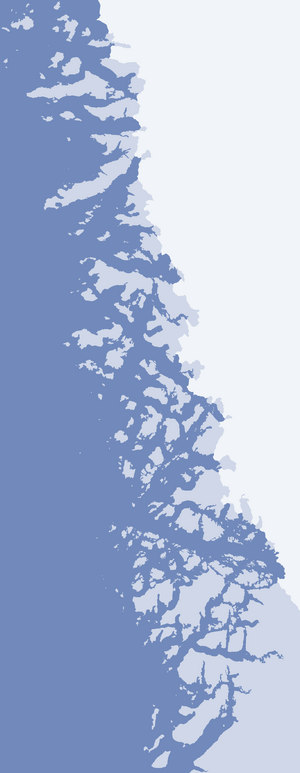
- Location within Upernavik Archipelago
- Location: Qaarsorsuaq Island, Upernavik Archipelago, Greenland

Umiasussuk (old spelling: Umiasugssuk) is a 620 m (2,030 ft) mountain in Avannaata municipality in northwestern Greenland, located in the northern part of Qaarsorsuaq Island in the Upernavik Archipelago. The name of the mountain means "a boat-shaped mountain" in the Greenlandic language.

== Geography ==
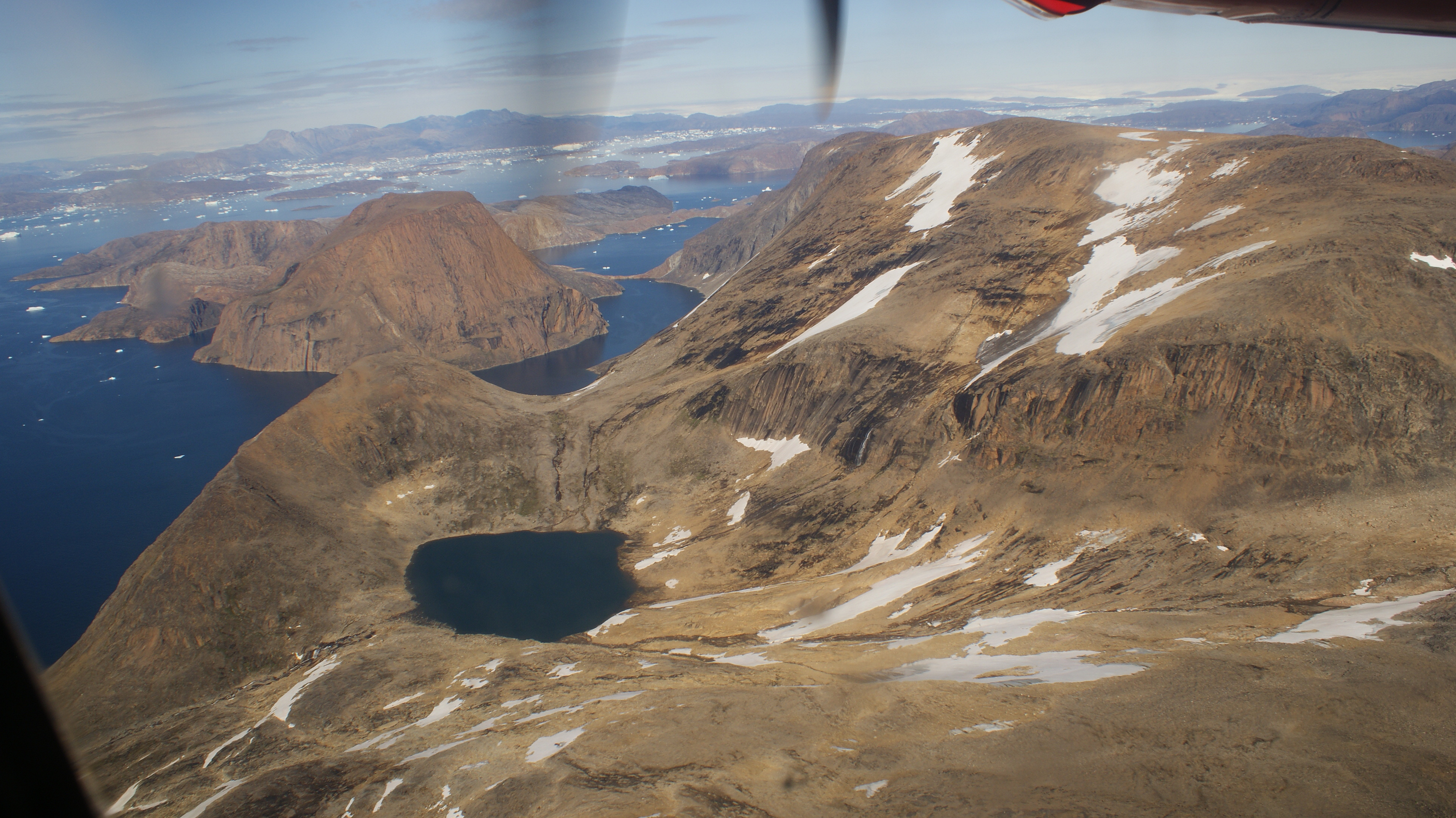
Aerial view of Umiasussuk (top left)

Umiasussuk is a standalone mountain, a flooded peak, whose trapezoid shape is the landmark of Upernavik town, visible from the Upernavik Airport 7 km (23,000 ft) away, and from the entire eastern and northern coast of Upernavik Island.

Via a small isthmus in the east, the mountain is connected with the remainder of the large Qaarsorsuaq Island. To the north, the Torsuut strait separates the mountain from Atilissuaq Island. To the west, the low Akia Island separates the mountain from Upernavik Island.
