= Amarortalik Island =

Island in Greenland

Amarortalik
- Location within Greenland

Geography
- Location: Greenland
- Coordinates: 72°33′N 54°53′W
- Archipelago: Upernavik Archipelago

Administration
- Greenland
- Municipality: Avannaata

Amarortalik Island is an uninhabited island in Avannaata municipality in northwestern Greenland. The name of the island means "the place of wolves" in the Greenlandic language.

== Geography ==
=== Location within the archipelago ===
Amarortalik Island is located in the southern part of the Upernavik Archipelago, in the group between Nunavik Peninsula in the south, and Upernavik Icefjord in the north.

In the west, the narrow Torsukattak Strait separates Amarortalik from Akuliaruseq Island. In the north, the small Kangerluarsuk Fjord separates it from Kangerluarsup Nunaa Peninsula, a peninsula branching off to the west from Koch's Land on the mainland of Greenland. Koch's land in turn is separated from Amarortalik by a small, unnamed strait. The long Eqalugaarsuit Sulluat Fjord separates the island from the large Kangeq Peninsula in the south.

=== Topography ===
Like all larger islands in the neighborhood, Amarortalik Island is very mountainous. The highest point is an unnamed peak of 823 m (2,700 ft) in the southern part of the island.

=== Geology ===
The rocks on the island are of Precambrian origin, with Albian-Campanian sediments.
