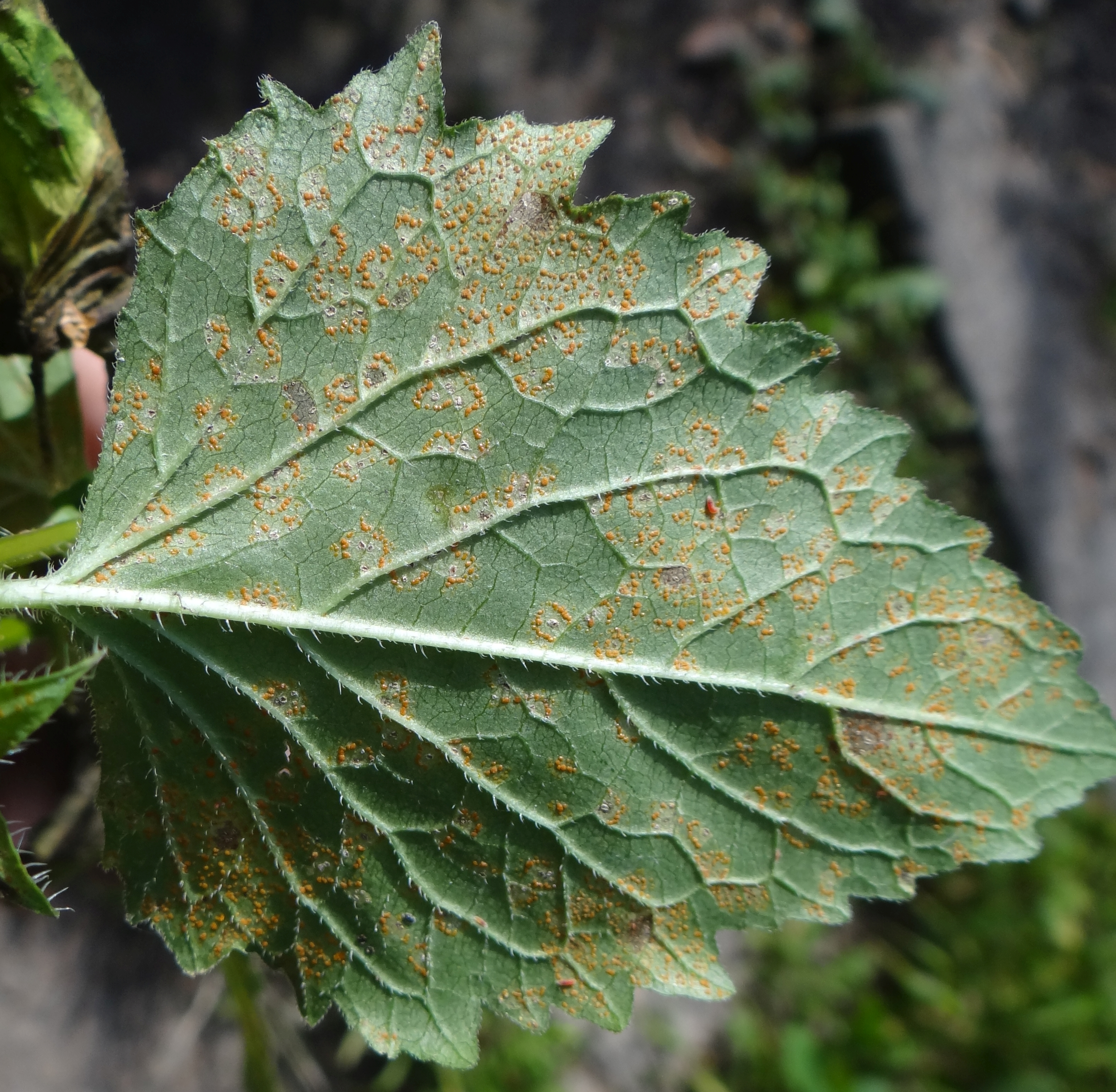
- P. campanulae on leaf of Campanula sp.

Scientific classification
- Kingdom: Fungi
- Division: Basidiomycota
- Class: Pucciniomycetes
- Order: Pucciniales
- Family: Pucciniaceae
- Genus: Puccinia
- Species: P. campanulae

Binomial name
- Puccinia campanulae Carmich. (1836)

Synonyms
- Micropuccinia campanulae (Carmich.) Arthur & H.S.Jacks. (1922); Puccinia campanulae-rotundifoliae Gäum. & Jaag (1935)

= Puccinia campanulae =

Species of fungus

Puccinia campanulae is a plant pathogen that causes rust on bellflower (Campanula).

In Iceland, it is known to infect Campanula rotundifolia, on which it produces teliospores, but it has not been found to infect Campanula uniflora, the other native Campanula species in Iceland. In Romania, it has been reported from Campanula lingulata and Campanula persicifolia.

== See also ==
- List of Puccinia species
