= Woman's Island =

Woman's Island may refer to:

- Upernavik Island, Greenland, formerly also known as Women's or Woman's Island
- Old Woman's Island or Little Colaba, a former island in Mumbai, India
- Kunoy (Faroese: "Woman's Island") in the Faroe Islands
