= Ammarqua Strait =

Geographical feature on island of Greenland

Coordinates: 72°37′N 55°17′W

Location within Greenland

Ammarqua Strait (old spelling: Angmarqua) is a strait in the southern part of the Upernavik Archipelago in Avannaata municipality in northwestern Greenland.

== Geography ==
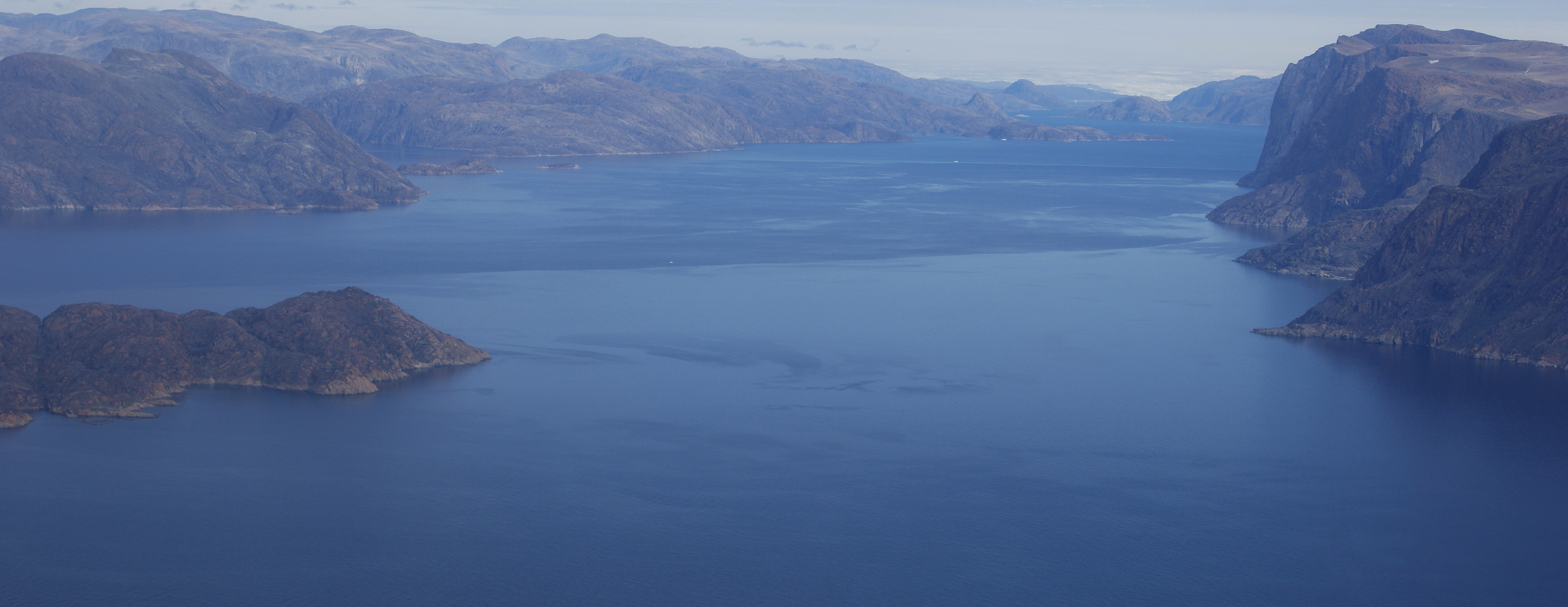
Aerial view of Ammarqua Strait

The strait separates Nutaarmiut Island from four large islands in the east, Uilortussoq Island and Saninngassoq Island in the north; Nako Island and Akuliaruseq Island in the south. The Eqalugaarsuit Suulluat Fjord opens into Ammarqua Strait immediately to the east of the southern cape, to the north of Kangeq Peninsula off the mainland of Greenland.

At the southern mouth of the strait at the confluence with Baffin Bay are two islands: the Ineraq Island and the double Singarnaq-Annertussoq Island, as well as smaller skerries.
