= Sandersons Hope =

Mountain in Avannaata, Greenland

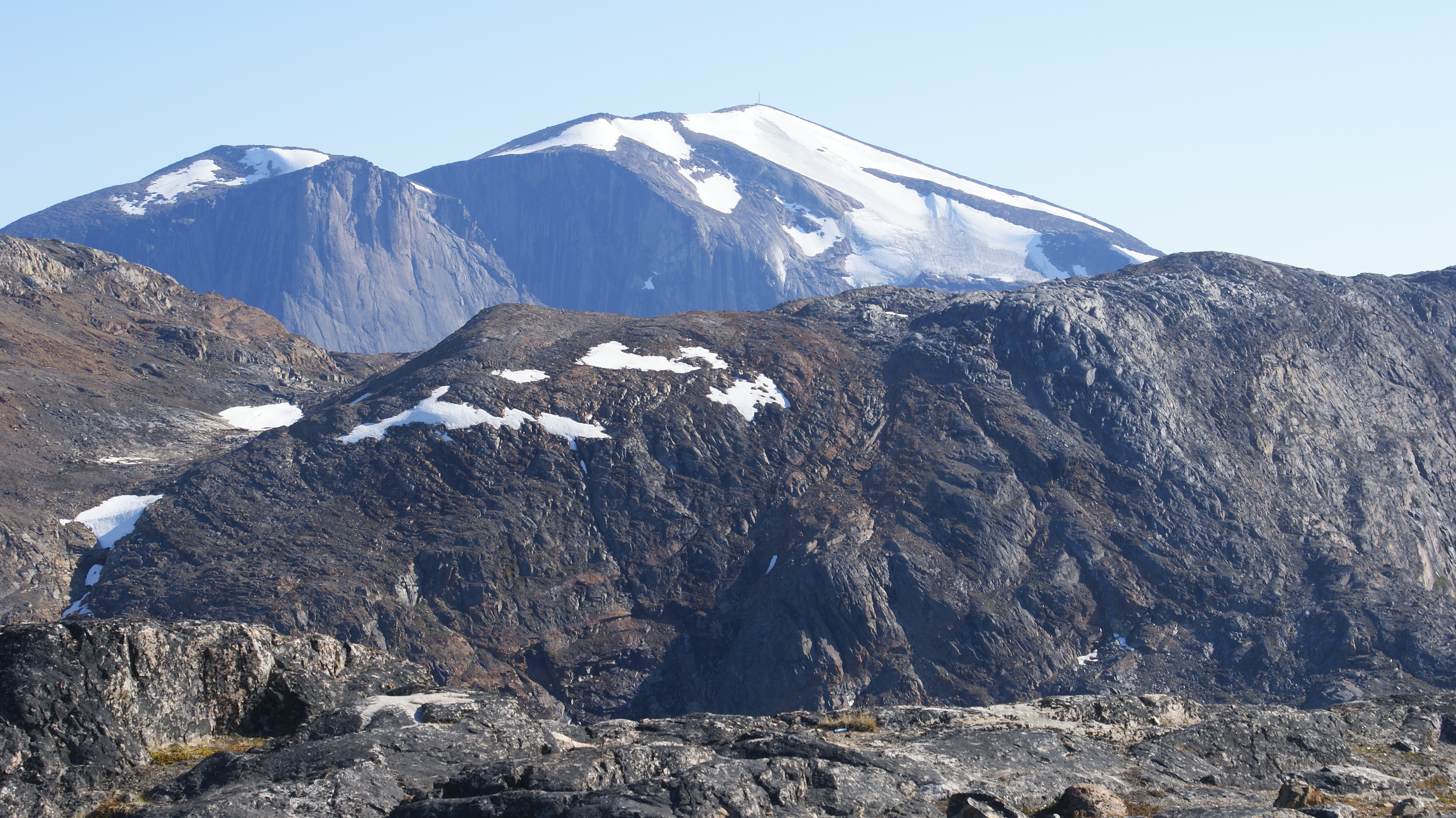
- Sandersons Hope seen from the north, from Upernavik Island

Highest point
- Elevation: 1,042 m (3,419 ft)
- Prominence: 1,042 m (3,419 ft)
- Coordinates: 72°42′14″N 56°03′50″W

Geography
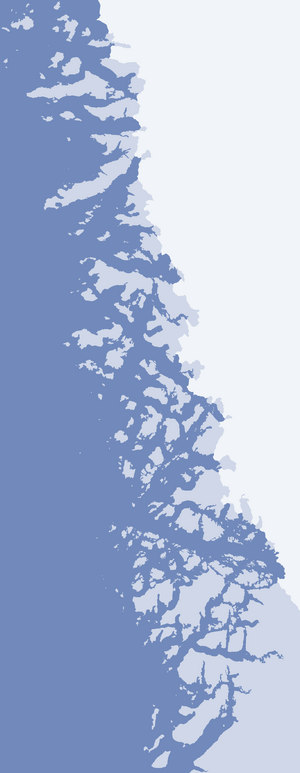
- Location within Upernavik Archipelago
- Location: Qaarsorsuaq Island, Upernavik Archipelago, Greenland

Sandersons Hope is a 1,042 m (3,419 ft) mountain in Avannaata municipality in northwestern Greenland, located in the western part of Qaarsorsuaq Island in the Upernavik Archipelago. It was named by John Davis in 1587.

== Geography ==
Sandersons Hope is covered by snow for most of the year, although it is not glaciated. It is visible from the Upernavik Airport 9.5 km (31,000 ft) away, and from the entire southeastern eastern coast of Upernavik Island.

== Gallery ==
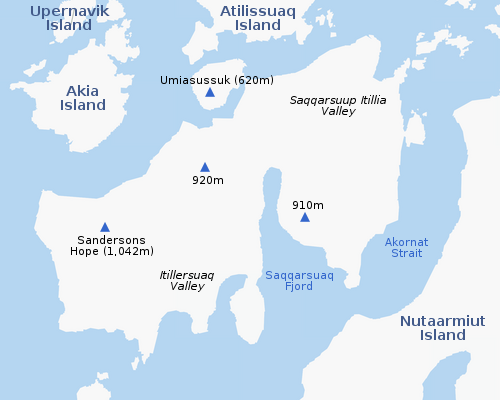
Location of Sandersons Hope on Qaarsorsuaq Island

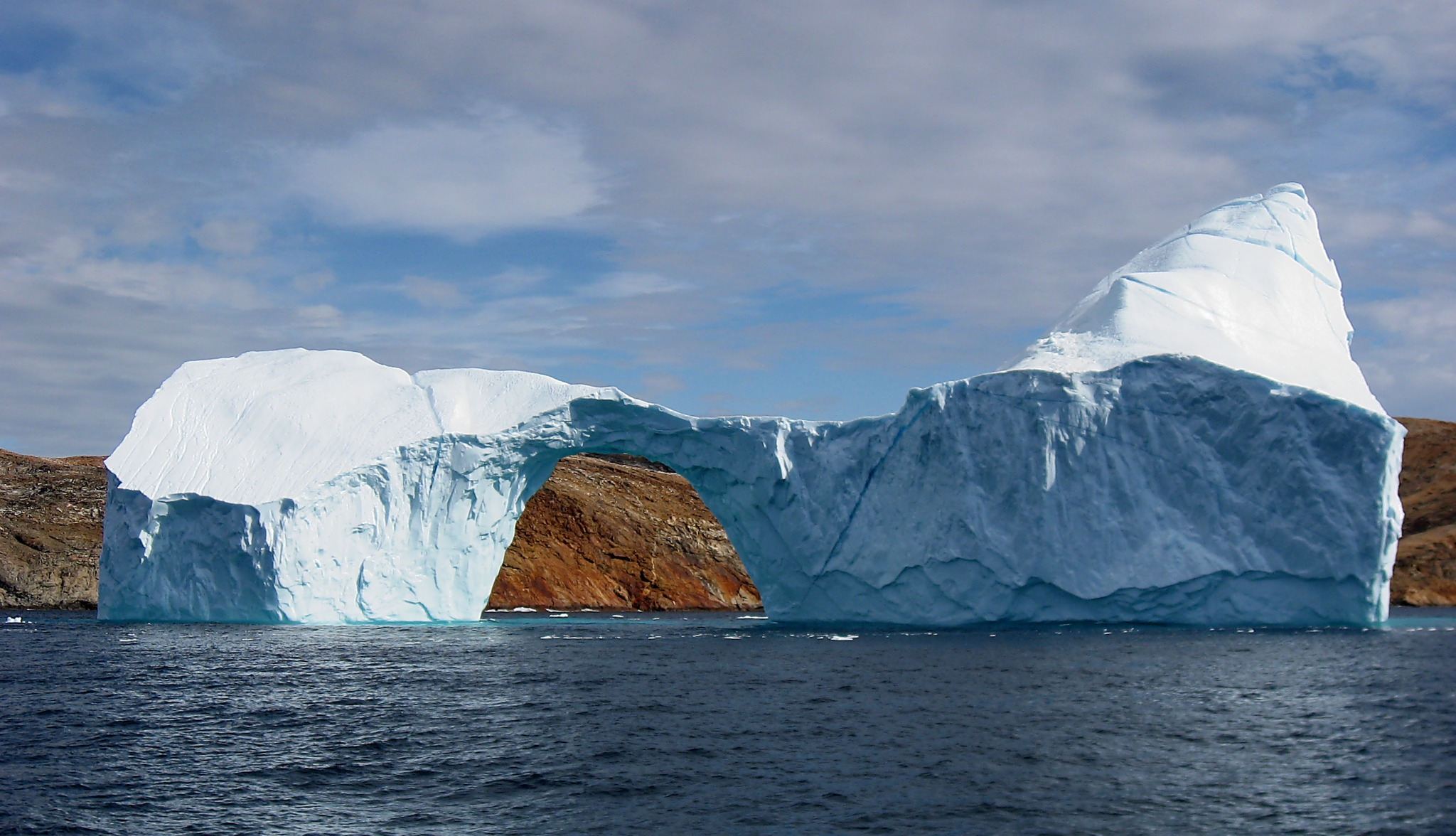
Iceberg near Sandersons Hope, July 28, 2007
