= Nutaarmiut Island =

Island in Greenland

Native name: Nutaarmiut
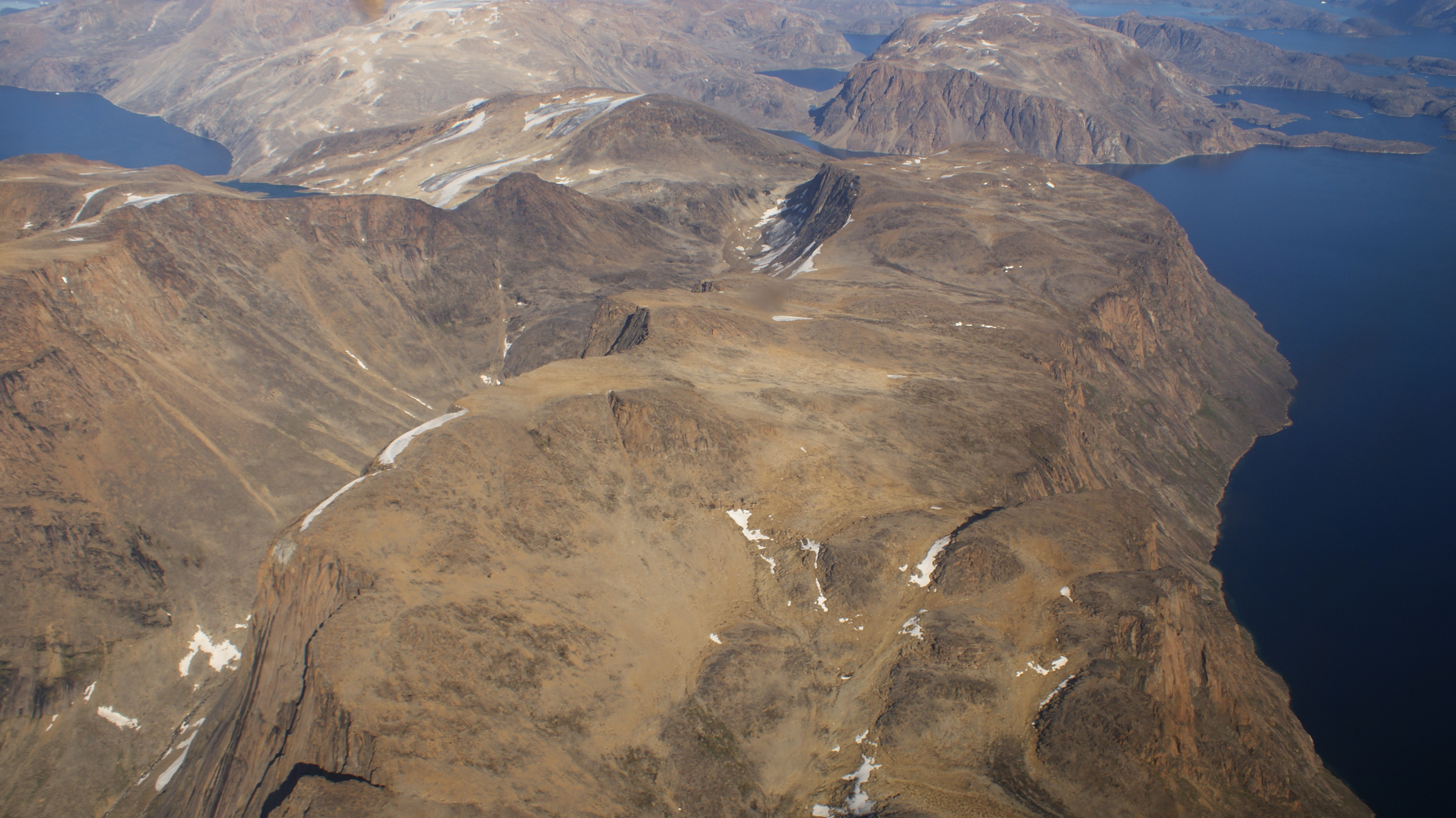
- Aerial view of Nutaarmiut Island

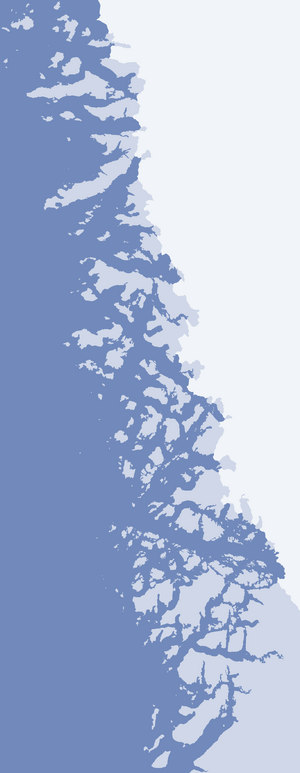
- Location of Nutaarmiut Island in Greenland Nutaarmiut Island (Greenland)
- Interactive map of Nutaarmiut Island

Geography
- Coordinates: 72.69918°N 55.41657°W
- Archipelago: Upernavik Archipelago
- Area: 354 km^{2} (137 sq mi)
- Area rank: 22nd largest in Greenland
- Length: 31 km (19.3 mi)
- Width: 21 km (13 mi)
- Highest elevation: 882 m (2894 ft)
- Highest point: Nalungiussaq

Administration
- Greenland
- Municipality: Avannaata

Demographics
- Population: 0 (2023)
- Pop. density: 0/km^{2} (0/sq mi)
- Ethnic groups: none

Nutaarmiut Island (old spelling: Nutârmiut) is an uninhabited island in Avannaata municipality in northwestern Greenland, with an area of 377 km^{2} (146 mi^{2}).

== Geography ==
The island is located in the southern part of Upernavik Archipelago, on the coast of Baffin Bay, approximately 17.5 km (10.9 mi) east-south-east of Upernavik town. To the west, the Akornat Strait separates the island from Qaarsorsuaq Island. To the northwest and northeast, small channels separate the island from Aappilattoq Island and several smaller skerries on the southern coast of the inner Upernavik Icefjord.

The Ammarqua Strait separates Nutaarmiut Island from four large islands in the east, Uilortussoq Island and Saninngassoq Island in the north; Nako Island and Akuliaruseq Island in the south. The Eqalugaarsuit Sulluat Fjord opens into Ammarqua Strait immediately to the east of the southern cape. In the southeast, the Ineraq Island and the double Singarnaq-Annertussoq Island separate Nutaarmiut Island from the open Baffin Bay.
