= Kangerlussuaq Fjord (Kangeq Peninsula) =

Fjord in Greenland

- Kangerlussuaq Inlet
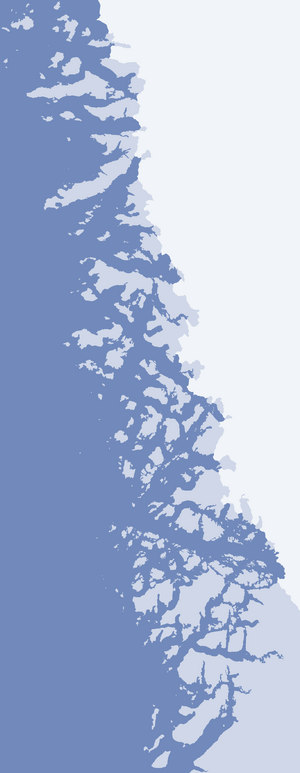
- Location in the Upernavik Archipelago area
- Location: Upernavik Archipelago
- Coordinates: 72°26′N 55°19′W
- Ocean/sea sources: Baffin Bay
- Basin countries: Greenland

Kangerlussuaq Fjord or Kangerlussuaq Inlet is a fjord in Avannaata Municipality, Western Greenland. It is located at the Kangeq Peninsula in the Upernavik Archipelago zone. This fjord cuts across the peninsula in a north–south direction.

== See also ==
- List of fjords of Greenland
