= Torsukattak Strait (Upernavik Archipelago) =

Strait in Avannaata, Greenland

Coordinates: 72°34′N 55°00′W

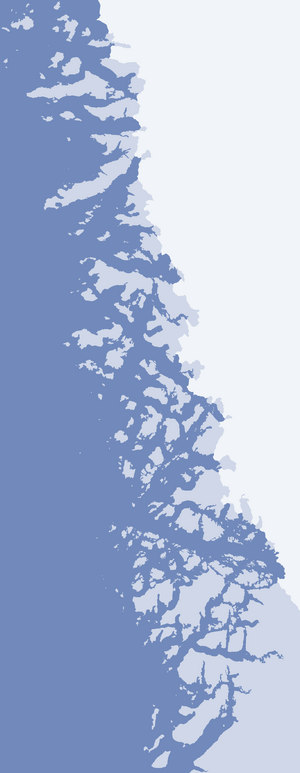
Torsukattak Strait (Upernavik Archipelago)

Torsukattak Strait (old spelling: Torssukátak) is a strait in Avannaata municipality in northwestern Greenland.

== Geography ==
Torsukattak Strait is located in the southern part of the Upernavik Archipelago, in the group between Nunavik Peninsula in the south, and Upernavik Icefjord in the north. The strait separates Akuliaruseq Island in the west from Amarortalik Island in the east. In the north, the strait empties into a small Kangerluarsuk Fjord off Koch's Land on the mainland of Greenland. In the south, it flows into Eqalugaarsuit Sulluat Fjord.
