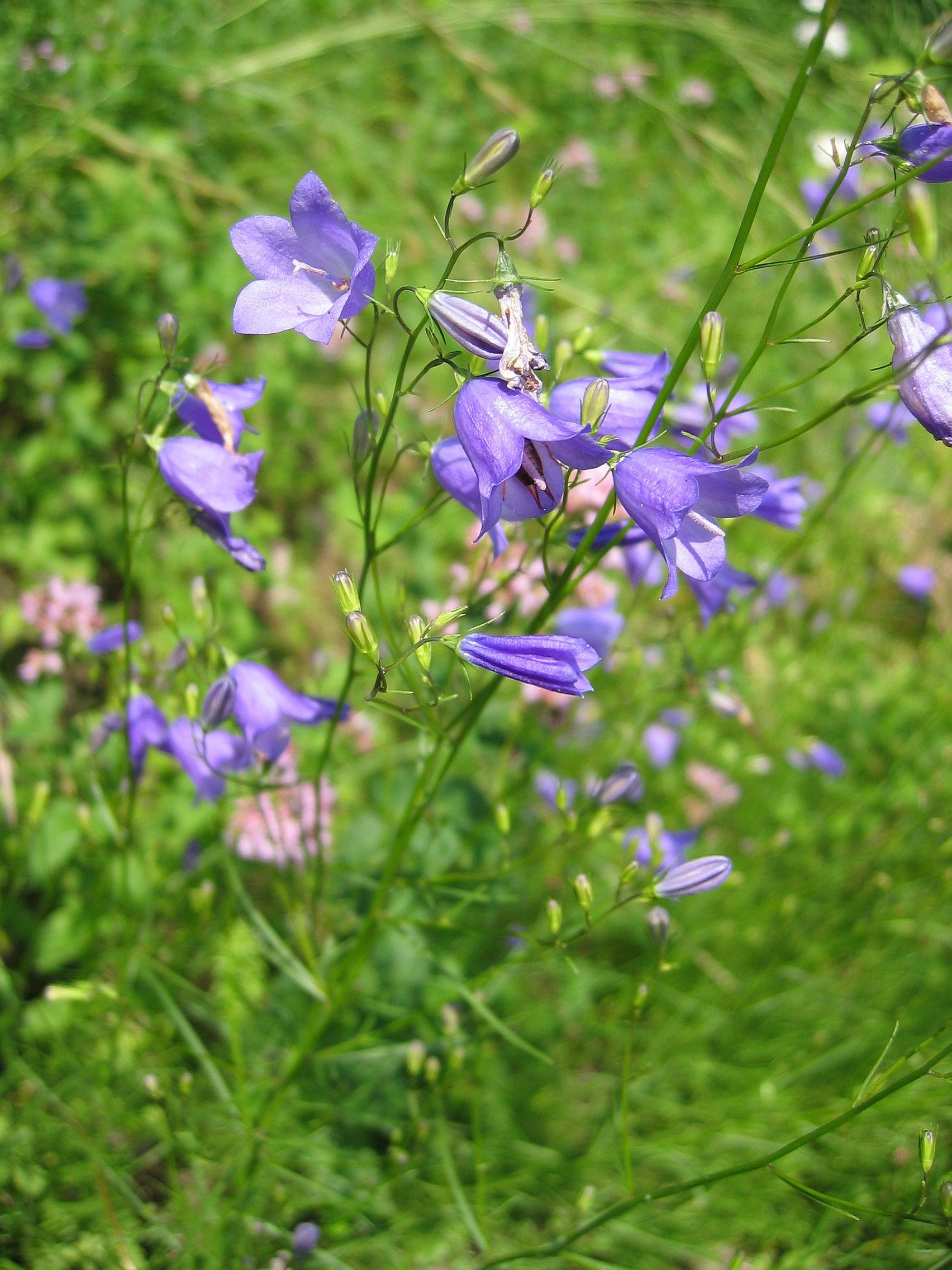

Scientific classification
- Kingdom: Plantae
- Clade: Tracheophytes
- Clade: Angiosperms
- Clade: Eudicots
- Clade: Asterids
- Order: Asterales
- Family: Campanulaceae
- Genus: Campanula
- Species: C. rotundifolia

Binomial name
- Campanula rotundifolia L.

Synonyms
- Synonymy: Campanula allophylla Raf. ex A.DC.; Campanula angustifolia Lam.; Campanula antirrhina Schleich.; Campanula asturica Podlech; Campanula bielzii Schur; Campanula bocconei Vill.; Campanula caballeroi Sennen & Losa; Campanula chinganensis A.I.Baranov; Campanula confertifolia (Reut.) Witasek; Campanula decloetiana Ortmann; Campanula heterodoxa Vest ex Schult.; Campanula hostii Baumg.; Campanula inconcessa Schott, Nyman & Kotschy; Campanula juncea Hill; Campanula lanceolata Lapeyr.; Campanula langsdorffiana (A. DC.) Trautv.; Campanula legionensis Pau; Campanula lobata Schloss. & Vuk.; Campanula lostrittii Ten.; Campanula minor Lam.; Campanula minuta Savi; Campanula pennina Reut.; Campanula pinifolia Uechtr. ex Pancic; Campanula pseudovaldensis Schur; Campanula solstitialis A.Kern.; Campanula tenuifolia Hoffm.; Campanula tenuifolia Mart.; Campanula tracheliifolia Losa ex Sennen; Campanula urbionensis Rivas Mart. & G.Navarro; Campanula wiedmannii Podlech; Depierrea campanuloides Schltdl.

= Campanula rotundifolia =

Species of flowering plant

Campanula rotundifolia, the harebell or common harebell, Scottish bluebell, or bluebell in Scotland, is a species of flowering plant in the bellflower family Campanulaceae. This herbaceous perennial is found throughout the north temperate regions of the Old World according to the Plants of the World Online database, or throughout the northern hemisphere in other interpretations (see Taxonomy, below). In Scotland, it is often known simply as bluebell. It is the floral emblem of Sweden where it is known as small bluebell. It produces its violet-blue, bell-shaped flowers in late summer and autumn.

The Latin specific epithet rotundifolia means "round leaved". This refers to the basal leaves; not all leaves are round in shape, with middle and upper stem leaves being linear.

== Description ==
Campanula rotundifolia is a slender, prostrate to erect herbaceous perennial, spreading by seed and rhizomes. The basal leaves are long-stalked, rounded to heart-shaped, usually slightly toothed, with prominent hydathodes, and often wither early. Leaves on the flowering stems are long and narrow and the upper ones are unstemmed. The inflorescence is a panicle or raceme, with one to many flowers borne on very slender pedicels. The flowers usually have five (occasionally 4, 6 or 7) pale to mid violet-blue petals fused together into a bell shape, about 12–30 mm (15/32–1 3/16 in) long and five long, pointed green sepals behind them. Plants with pale pink or white flowers may also occur. The petal lobes are triangular and curve outwards. The seeds are produced in a capsule about 3–4 mm (1/8–5/32 in) diameter and are released by pores at the base of the capsule. Seedlings are minute, but established plants can compete with tall grass. As with many other Campanula species, all parts of the plant exude white latex when injured or broken.

The flowering period is long and varies by location. In the British Isles, harebell flowers from July to November. The flowers are pollinated by bees, but can self-pollinate.

== Taxonomy ==
Campanula rotundifolia was first formally described in 1753 by Carl Linnaeus. As of 2023, no varieties or subspecies of Campanula rotundifolia are accepted in Plants of the World Online (POWO). Several species have been previously described as varieties or subspecies of C. rotundifolia:

- Campanula alaskana (Campanula rotundifolia var. alaskana, C. r. var. hirsuta) - Alaskan bellflower; Alaska, northwestern Canada
- Campanula giesekiana (C. r. var. dubia, C. r. var. groenlandica) - Giesecke's harebell; eastern Canada, Greenland, Iceland, Scandinavia, northwest Russia
- Campanula intercedens (C. r. var. dentata, C. r. var. intercedens) - intermediate bellflower; eastern Canada, northeastern United States
- Campanula kladniana (C. r. subsp. kladniana); Romania, Ukraine
- Campanula macrorhiza (C. r. var. aitanica, C. r. var. alcoiana); France (including Corsica), Italy, Spain
- Campanula moravica (C. r. subsp. moravica); eastern Europe
- Campanula nejceffii (C. r. var. bulgarica); central Bulgaria
- Campanula petiolata (C. r. var. petiolata) - western harebell; western North America
- Campanula ruscinonensis (C. r. var. ruscinonensis); eastern Pyrenees in southern France and northeastern Spain
- Campanula willkommii (C. r. subsp. willkommii); Sierra Nevada in southern Spain

Although POWO and World Flora Online (WFO) accept these as separate species, many other sources do not. For example, both the Database of Vascular Plants of Canada (VASCAN) and the USDA Natural Resources Conservation Service PLANTS database (PLANTS) do not accept any of these species as valid or even regard them as valid subspecies. This is also the case with authoritative floras such as Flora of Colorado.

While it is now commonly known as harebell or bluebell, it was historically known by several other names including blawort, hair-bell, lady's thimble, witch's bells, and witch's thimbles.

Elsewhere in Britain, "bluebell" refers to Hyacinthoides non-scripta, and in North America, "bluebell" typically refers to species in the genus Mertensia, such as Mertensia virginica (Virginia bluebells).

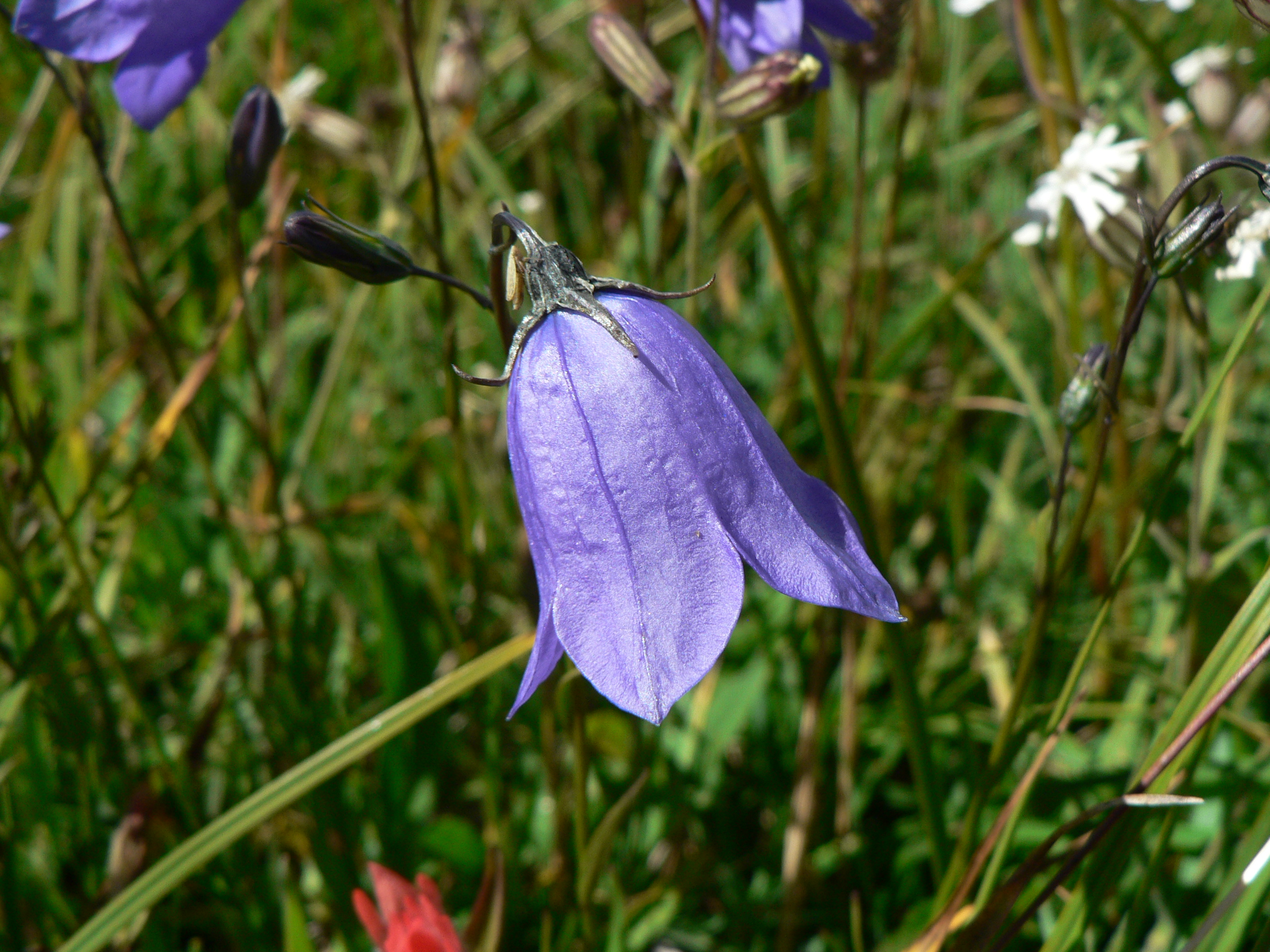
Petal lobes curve outwards

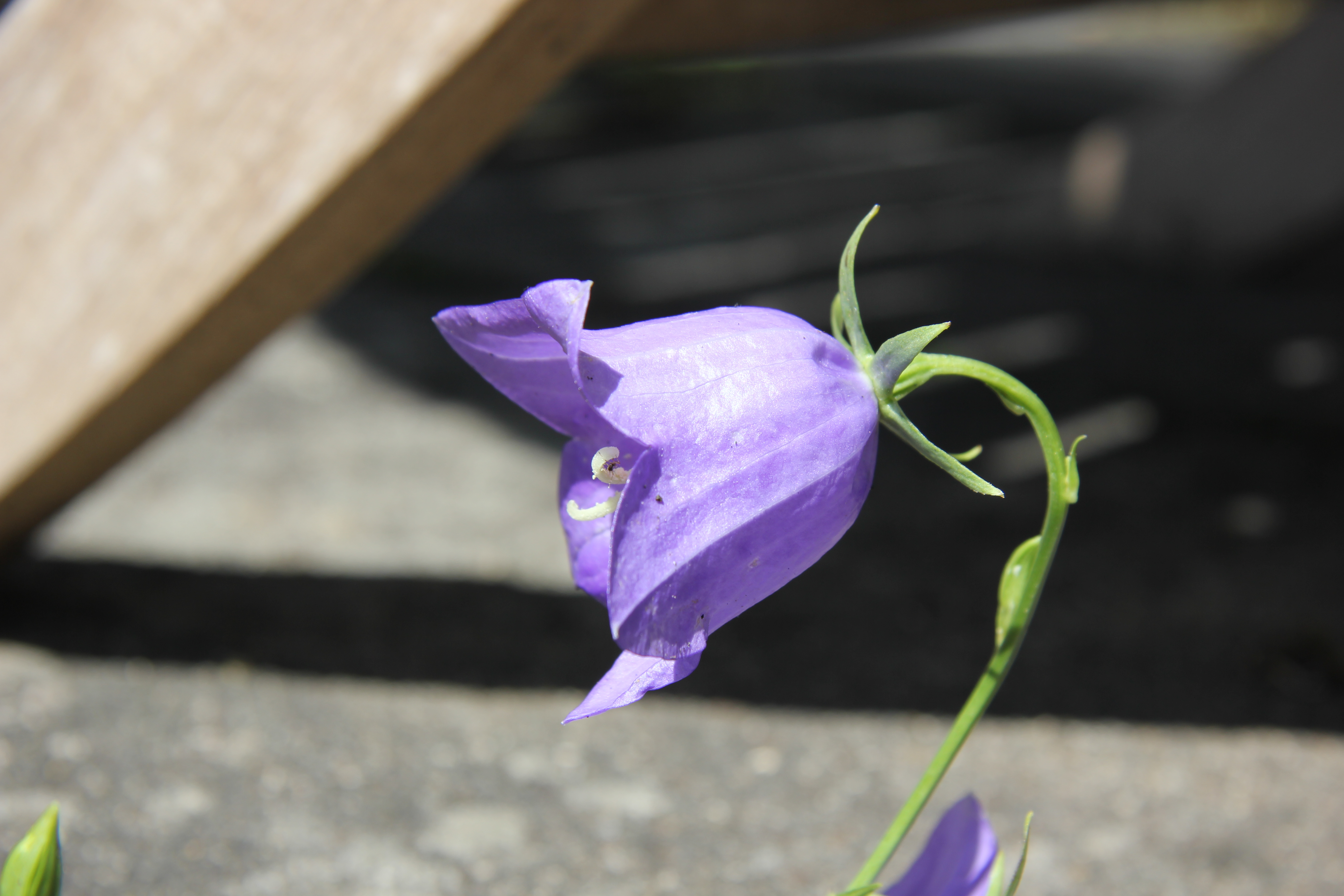
Growing wild on a soil covered concrete slab

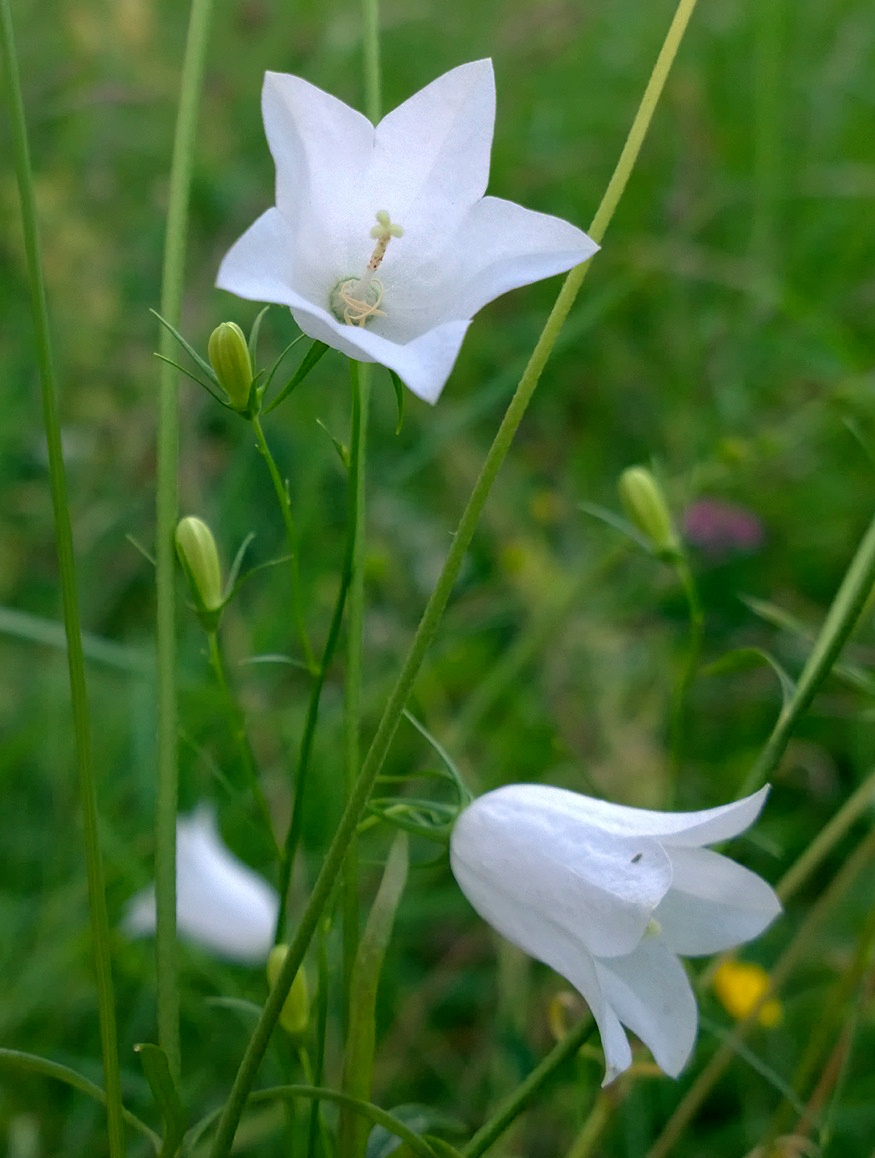
White variant

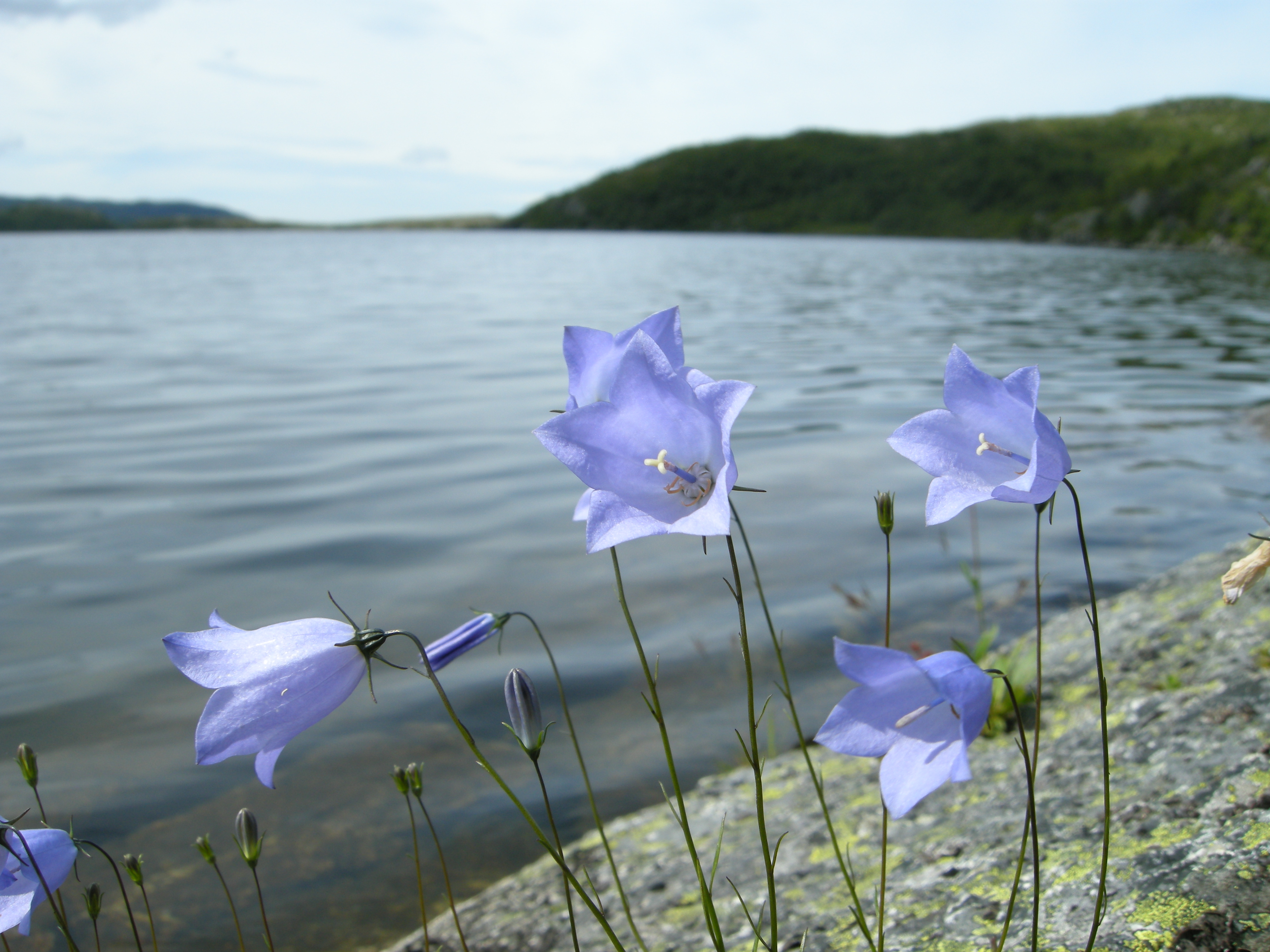
In southern Norway

== Distribution and habitat ==
Following the POWO database, Campanula rotundifolia occurs from Iceland south through Great Britain and Ireland to Spain, and east across Europe and Asia to the Pacific coast of Russia and northeastern China, but absent from North America. Some other European authors also accept its occurrence in Spitzbergen, and the southern coasts of Greenland.

Some sources and authorities like the VASCAN and PLANTS do not currently separate out different species for North America. If using these sources it is widely distributed through North America including all of Canada and most of the United States.

It occurs as tetraploid or hexaploid populations in Britain and Ireland, but diploids occur widely in continental Europe. In Britain, the tetraploid population has an easterly distribution and the hexaploid population a westerly distribution, and very little mixing occurs at the range boundaries.

Harebells grow in dry, nutrient-poor grasslands and heaths. The plant often successfully colonises cracks in walls or cliff faces and stable dunes.

C. rotundifolia is more inclined to occupy climates that have an average temperature below 0 °C in the cold months and above 10 °C in the summer.

In Iceland, research on Campanula rotundifolia has revealed that it is a host of at least three species of pathogenic fungi, Coleosporium tussilaginis, Puccinia campanulae and Sporonema campanulae (and the teleomorph Leptotrochila radians).

== In culture ==
The harebell is dedicated to Saint Dominic.

In 2002 Plantlife named it the county flower of Yorkshire in the United Kingdom.

William Shakespeare makes a reference to 'the azured hare-bell' in Cymbeline:

With fairest flowers,
Whilst summer lasts, and I live here, Fidele,
I'll sweeten thy sad grave: thou shalt not lack
The flower that's like thy face, pale primrose, nor
The azured hare-bell, like thy veins; no, nor
The leaf of eglantine, whom not to slander,
Out-sweeten'd not thy breath. (Note: In Jessica Kerr's and Opelia Dowden's Shakespeare's Flowers published in 1970 they infer that Shakespeare was actually making reference to Hyacinthoides non-scripta.)

Christina Rossetti (1830–1894) wrote a poem entitled 'Hope is Like A Harebell':

Hope is like a harebell, trembling from its birth,
Love is like a rose, the joy of all the earth,
Faith is like a lily, lifted high and white,
Love is like a lovely rose, the world's delight.
Harebells and sweet lilies show a thornless growth,
But the rose with all its thorns excels them both.

Emily Dickinson uses the harebell as an analogy for desire that grows cold once that which is cherished is attained:

Did the Harebell loose her girdle
To the lover Bee
Would the Bee the Harebell hallow
Much as formerly?

Did the paradise – persuaded
Yield her moat of pearl
Would the Eden be an Eden
Or the Earl – an Earl
