= Akuliaruseq Island =

Island in Greenland

Akuliaruseq
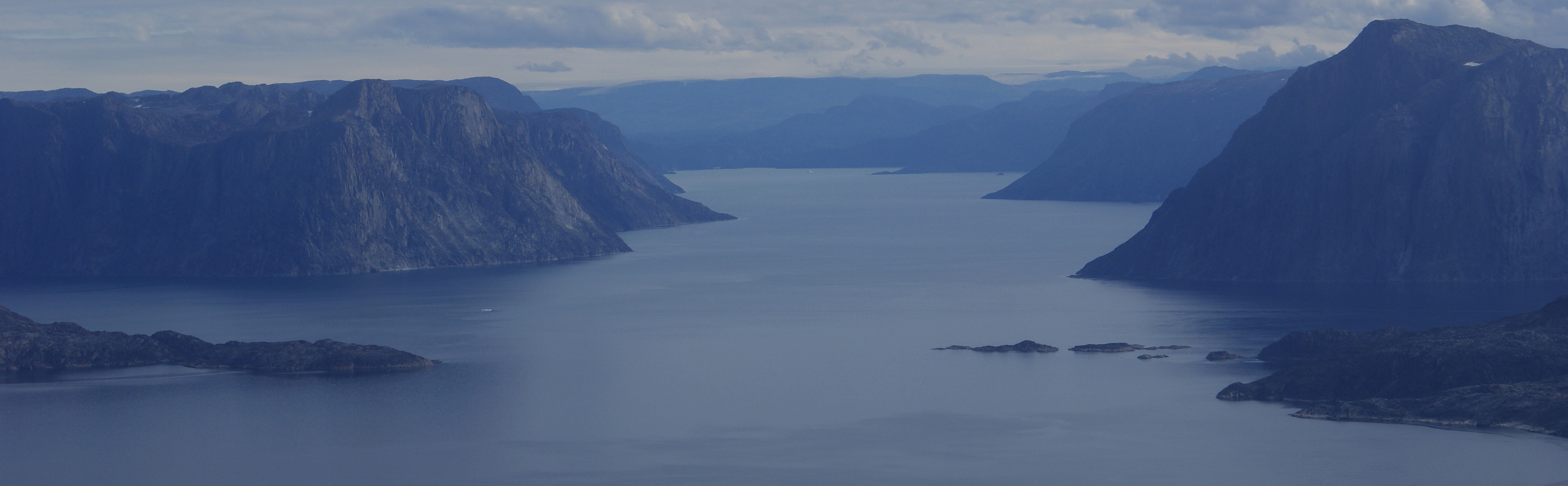
- Akuliaruseq Island (left), Eqalugaarsuit Fjord (center), and Kangeq Peninsula (right)

- Location within Greenland

Geography
- Location: Greenland
- Coordinates: 72°33′30″N 55°10′00″W
- Archipelago: Upernavik Archipelago

Administration
- Greenland
- Municipality: Avannaata

Akuliaruseq Island is an uninhabited island in the Avannaata municipality in northwestern Greenland.

== Geography ==
=== Location within the archipelago ===
Akuliaruseq Island is located in the southern part of the Upernavik Archipelago, in the group between Nunavik Peninsula in the south, and Upernavik Icefjord in the north.

In the west, Ammarqua Strait separates Akuliaruseq Island from Nutaarmiut Island, the largest island in the archipelago. A small, unnamed channel branching to the east off Ammarqua separates the island from Nako Island in the north. In the east, the narrow Torsukattak Strait separates Akuliaruseq from Amarortalik Island.

The long Eqalugaarsuit Sulluat Fjord separates the island from the large Kangeq Peninsula in the south. The southern coastline is indented by a small Puugutaata Ilua bay branching off the fjord. It is the only indentation in the otherwise undeveloped coastline of the island.

=== Topography ===
Like all larger islands in the neighborhood, Akuliaruseq Island is very mountainous. The highest point is an unnamed peak of 720 m (2,360 ft) in the western part of the island. Apart from the coastal lowland isthmus in the southeast, the majority of the island is occupied by a single, flooded mountain. Another previously flooded mountain, Puugutaa, culminating in a 550 m (1,800 ft) peak is located on the other side of the low isthmus.

=== Geology ===
The rocks on the island are of Precambrian origin, with Albian-Campanian sediments.
