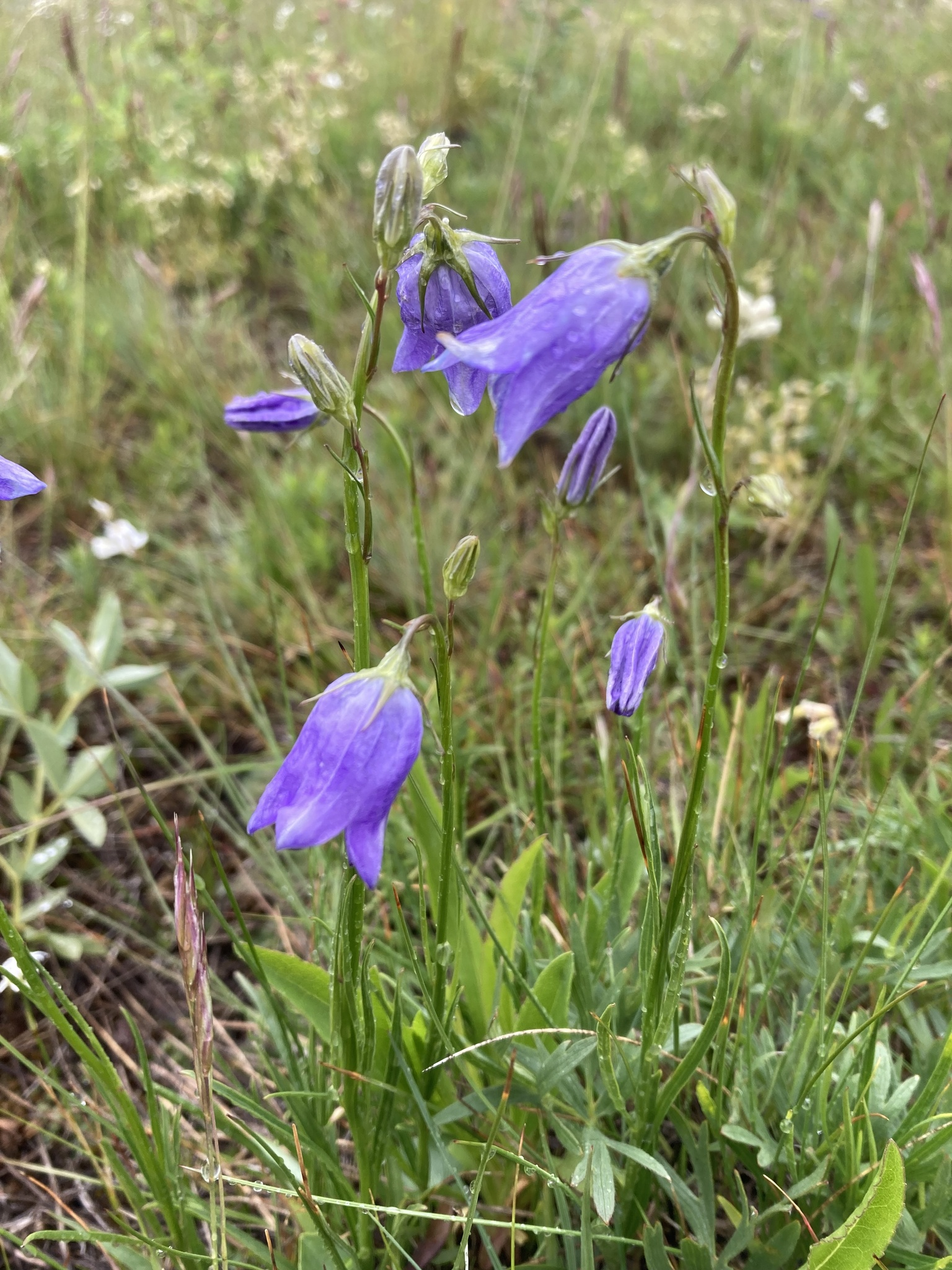
- In Alberta, Canada

Conservation status
- Secure (NatureServe)

Scientific classification
- Kingdom: Plantae
- Clade: Tracheophytes
- Clade: Angiosperms
- Clade: Eudicots
- Clade: Asterids
- Order: Asterales
- Family: Campanulaceae
- Genus: Campanula
- Species: C. alaskana

Binomial name
- Campanula alaskana (A.Gray) W.Wight

= Campanula alaskana =

Species of flowering plant

Campanula alaskana, the Alaska bellflower, is a species of flowering plant in the family Campanulaceae, native to north-western North America (the Aleutian Islands, Alaska, the Yukon, British Columbia, Washington state). It was first described by Asa Gray in 1886 as Campanula rotundifolia var. alaskana and elevated to a full species by William Wright in 1918.
