= Akia Island =

Island in northwestern Greenland

Akia
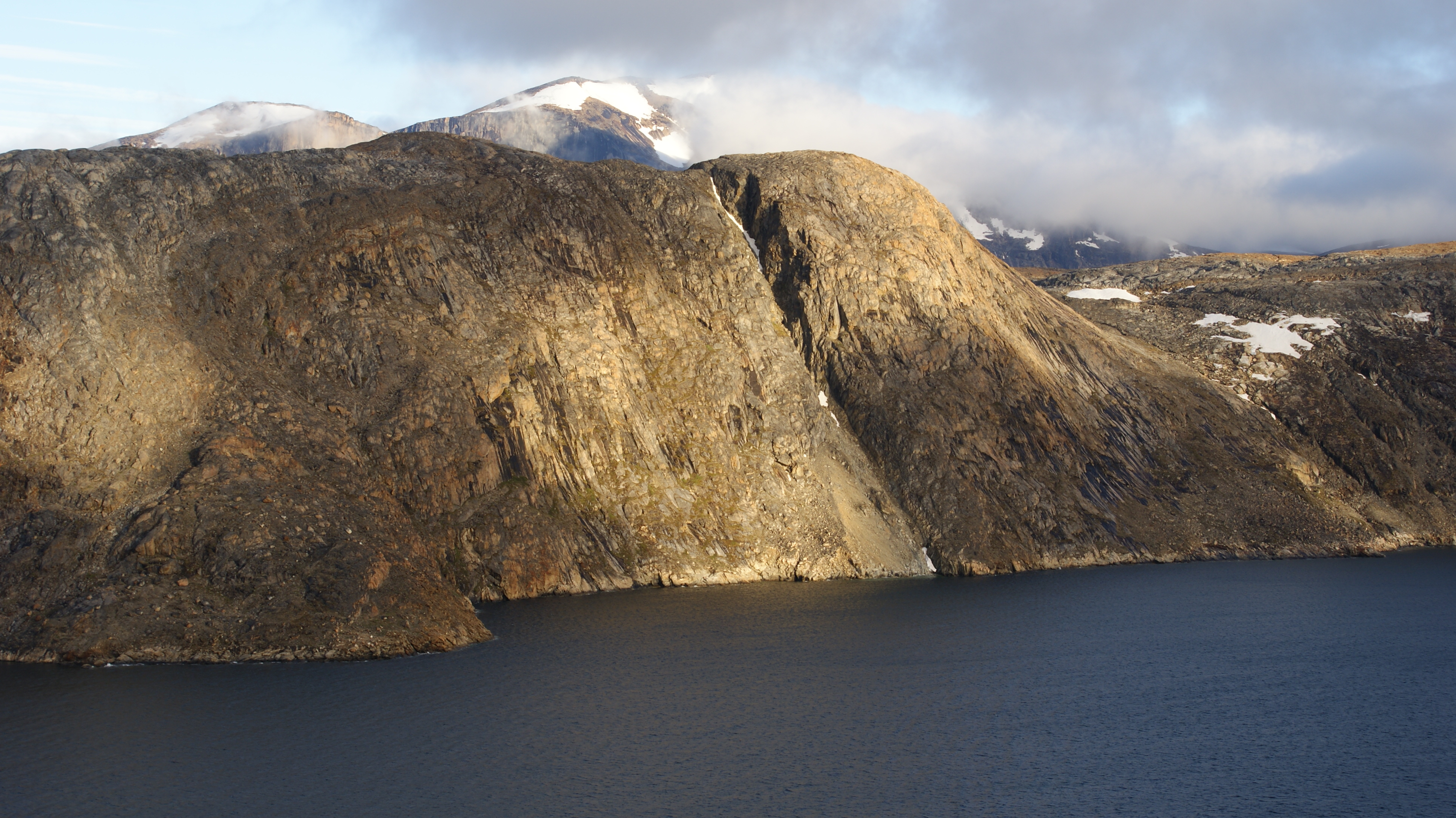
- Akia Island seen from the north

- Location within Greenland

Geography
- Location: Greenland
- Coordinates: 72°45′10″N 56°07′00″W
- Archipelago: Upernavik Archipelago
- Length: 5.8 km (3.6 mi)
- Width: 5.8 km (3.6 mi)

Administration
- Greenland
- Municipality: Avannaata

Akia Island (Danish: Langø) is an uninhabited island in Avannaata municipality in northwestern Greenland. The name of the island means "turned on its side" in the Greenlandic language.

== Geography ==
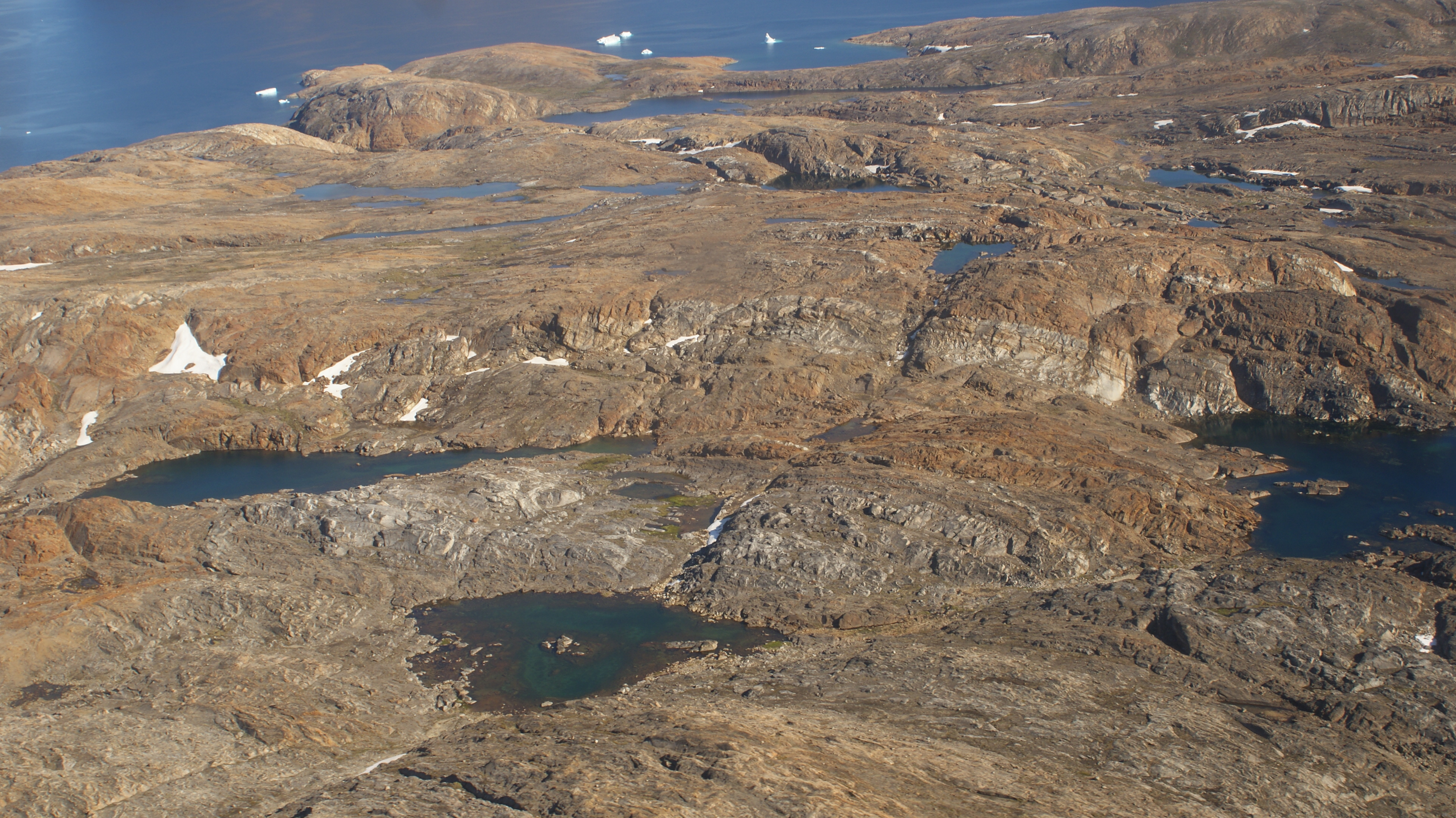
Aerial view of the interior of Akia Island

Akia Island is located in the outer belt of islands in the Upernavik Archipelago, in the group between the Upernavik Icefjord in the north, and Nunavik Peninsula in the south, approximately 500 m (1,600 ft) to the southeast of Upernavik Island, on the other side of a small waterway separating the islands.

In the east and south, another small waterway separates Akia from a larger Qaarsorsuaq Island. In the west, several small skerries such as Avannarleq (Danish: Nordø), Qeqertasussuk (Danish: Bruuns ø), and Aorrussaq (Danish: Hvalø) buffer the western coast from the open waters of Baffin Bay.

Pear-shaped and hilly, the island culminates in an unnamed 220 m (720 ft) peak in the central-northern part of the island. There are many small ponds and lakes in the interior of the island.

=== Promontories ===
Name	Direction	Latitude N	Longitude W
Pamiua (Danish: Søndre Næs)	Western Cape	72°45′41″	56°12′52″
(none)	Northern Cape	72°47′22″	56°03′17″
Sarpinat	Eastern Cape (not the easternmost point)	72°45′58″	56°02′36″
Umiartorfik	Southern Cape	72°44′06″	56°06′56″
