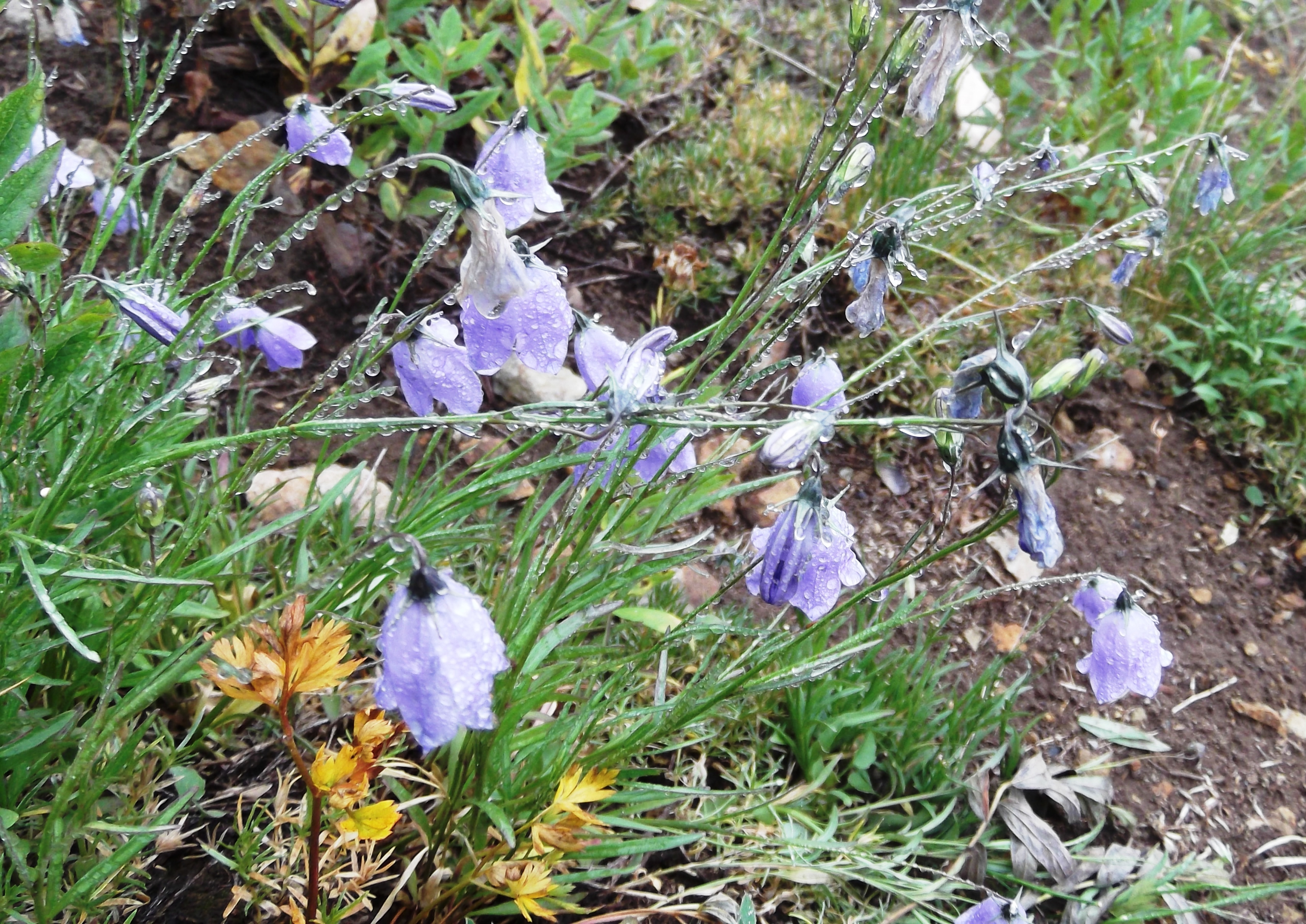

Scientific classification
- Kingdom: Plantae
- Clade: Tracheophytes
- Clade: Angiosperms
- Clade: Eudicots
- Clade: Asterids
- Order: Asterales
- Family: Campanulaceae
- Genus: Campanula
- Species: C. petiolata

Binomial name
- Campanula petiolata A.DC.

Synonyms
- Campanula macdougalii Rydb.; Campanula sacajaweana Peck; Campanula rotundifolia var. petiolata (A.DC.) J.K.Henry; Campanula stylocampa Eastw.

= Campanula petiolata =

Species of flowering plant

Campanula petiolata is a flowering plant that is called western harebell when it is distinguished from Campanula rotundifolia or simply harebell when it is considered the same species. It is in the bellflower family (Campanulaceae). This herbaceous perennial is found in areas of western North America with continental climates. It produces violet-blue, bell-shaped flowers in late summer and autumn. It is closely related to Campanula rotundifolia and is considered either a subspecies or the same species by many botanists.

== Description ==
Campanula petiolata is a slender, prostrate to erect herbaceous perennial 10–50 centimeters tall when fully developed. The leaves at the base of the plant (basal leaves) are round to egg shaped (ovate) in shape, mostly toothed, and usually disappear before the plants flower. The basal leaves are more often ovate than round.

The leaves on the lower stem are slightly widened in the middle to resembling a skinny lance point (lanceolate) with saw toothed edges (serrate). The upper leaves are reduced to being long and thin like a grass blade (linear) or just slightly lanceolate. Due to the drier habitats of North America the foliage is firmer than that of Campanula rotundifolia. The leaf surfaces are usually smooth, but are rarely slightly rough in texture with fine hairs (scabrous-pubescent).

The flowering stems are usually smooth, but when hairy the very small hairs cover the stem completely rather than being confined to lines on the stem. The stems tend to be more upright (strict) than Campanula rotundifolia. The inflorescence is a panicle or raceme, with 1 to many flowers borne on very slender pedicels. The flowers are a bell shape with five points from the five sepals fused together (5-cleft calyx). The flower is sometimes broader than it is long. The flowers are usually a pale lavender to dawn blue in color. Plants with pale white or albino flowers may also occur, the former with a pink-lavender stigma and the later with a creamy white stigma.

When flowering is finished the plant produces a nodding capsule that contains the very minute seeds. It has short underground rhizomes.

== Taxonomy ==
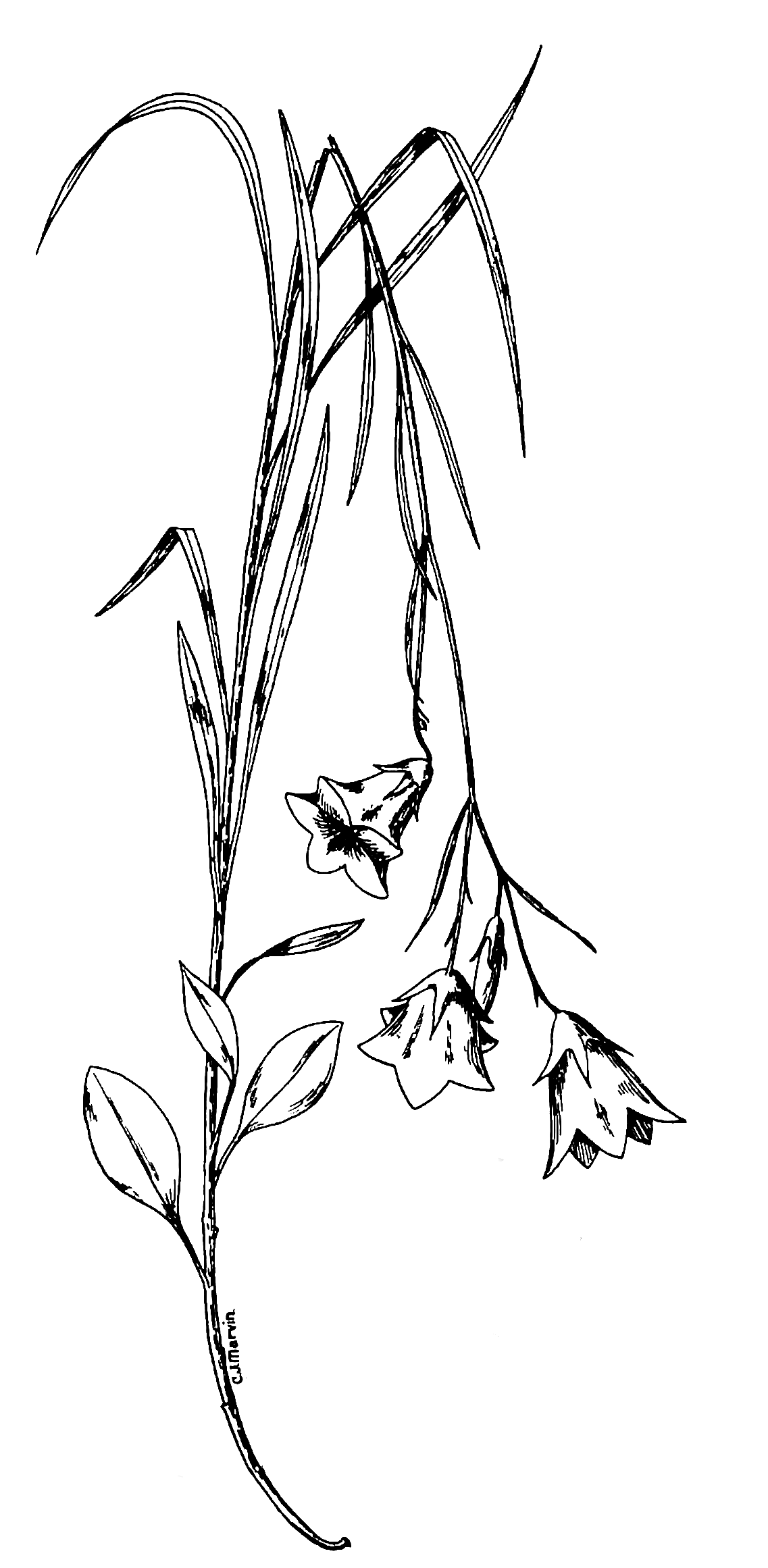
Campanula petiolata illustrated by CJ Marvin, from Wild Flowers and Trees of Colorado by Francis Ramaley 1909

Campanula petiolata was scientifically described and named by Alphonse Pyramus de Candolle in his 1830 publication, Monographie des campanulées. It was subsequently described as a subspecies of Campanula rotundifolia as var. petiolata by Joseph Kaye Henry in 1915. Reprints of some authoritative plant identification books, such as Handbook of Northwest Flowering Plants by Gilkey and Powell, continued to list C. petiolata as a separate species as late as 1961.

It is considered an accepted species by Plants of the World Online, World Flora Online, and World Plants. It also is used as a taxon to record observations on iNaturalist. In contrast the USDA Natural Resources Conservation Service PLANTS database lists it as a synonym to Campanula rotundifolia.

Regardless of the validity of Campanula petiolata as a species, modern research indicates the European and North American populations separated due to a colonization event approximately 114 thousand years before the present. North American populations are derived from and most closely related to the Campanula rotundifolia populations of Northern Europe, especially those in Sweden and Ireland.

=== Names ===
The binomial name Campanula petiolata refers to the bell shaped flowers of its genus and to leaves being petiolate, having a short stalk to attach them to the main stem. The wildflower writer Claude A. Barr used the common name western harebell to distinguish this species from the European species. Often a full list of European common or traditional names are also attributed to Campanula petiolata when it is assumed it is the same species as the flower that grow in Europe, such as "bellflower", "lady's thimble", "witch's thimble", "heathbells", "bluebells", "fairies’ thimbles", and "dead men’s bells".

== Habitat and range ==
Plants of the world online records Campanula petiolata as growing in the far north of Canada in Nunavut and the Yukon southwards to the United States west of the Dakotas, Colorado, and Texas. The southern limit of its range extends into north east of Mexico. In the Pacific Northwest they are unevenly distributed from sea level to approximately 1900 meters in elevation. In the Southern Rocky Mountains they are often found on grassy hillsides, in lodgepole pine forests, along road cuts in montane ecosystems from the foothills to the timberline. In northern Mexico it grows in three states, Chihuahua, Coahuila, and Nuevo León. Campanula petiolata will grow in relatively dry areas in the mountains or in medium (mesic) soils, but require well drained gravely or sandy soils if conditions have more moisture.

== Ecology ==
The leaf-cutter bee species Megachile melanophaea has been collected from the flowers of Campanula petiolata at least once. It is one of the few plants that will continue to bloom in the high mountain parks of Colorado into the summer from mid July to August.

== Cultivation ==
The western harebell is rhizomatous, forming a clump of plants and tends to have more of this character when growing in sunny conditions.
