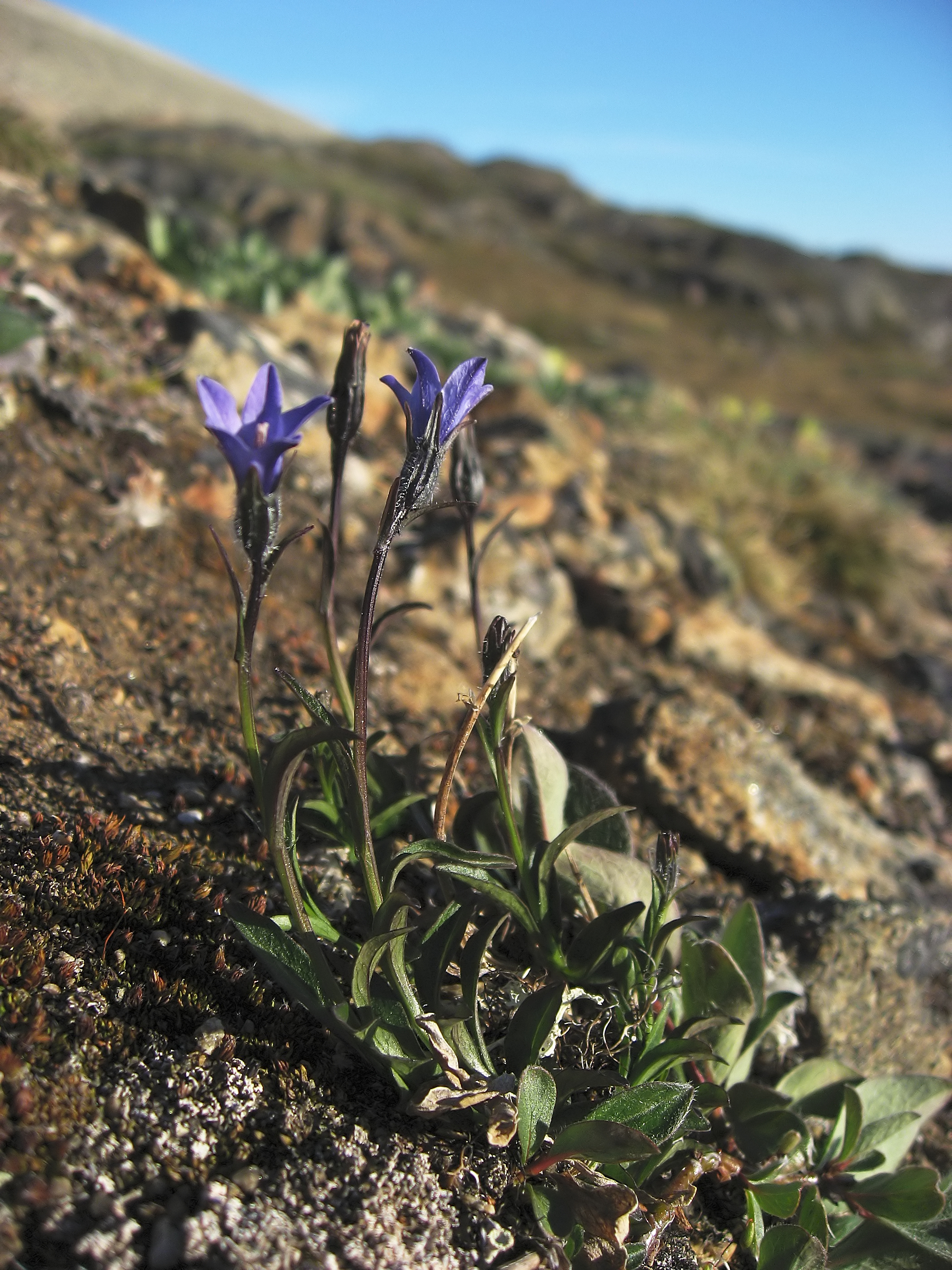
- Melanocalyx uniflora

Scientific classification
- Kingdom: Plantae
- Clade: Tracheophytes
- Clade: Angiosperms
- Clade: Eudicots
- Clade: Asterids
- Order: Asterales
- Family: Campanulaceae
- Genus: Melanocalyx (Fed.) Morin

Synonyms
- Campanula subsect. Melanocalyx Fed.

= Melanocalyx =

Genus of flowering plants

Melanocalyx is a genus of flowering plants in the family Campanulaceae. It includes two species native to subarctic regions of Eurasia and North America and subalpine regions of the Rocky Mountains of western Canada and the west-central United States.

- Melanocalyx tschuktschorum (Jurtzev & Fed.) Khoreva
- Melanocalyx uniflora (L.) Morin
