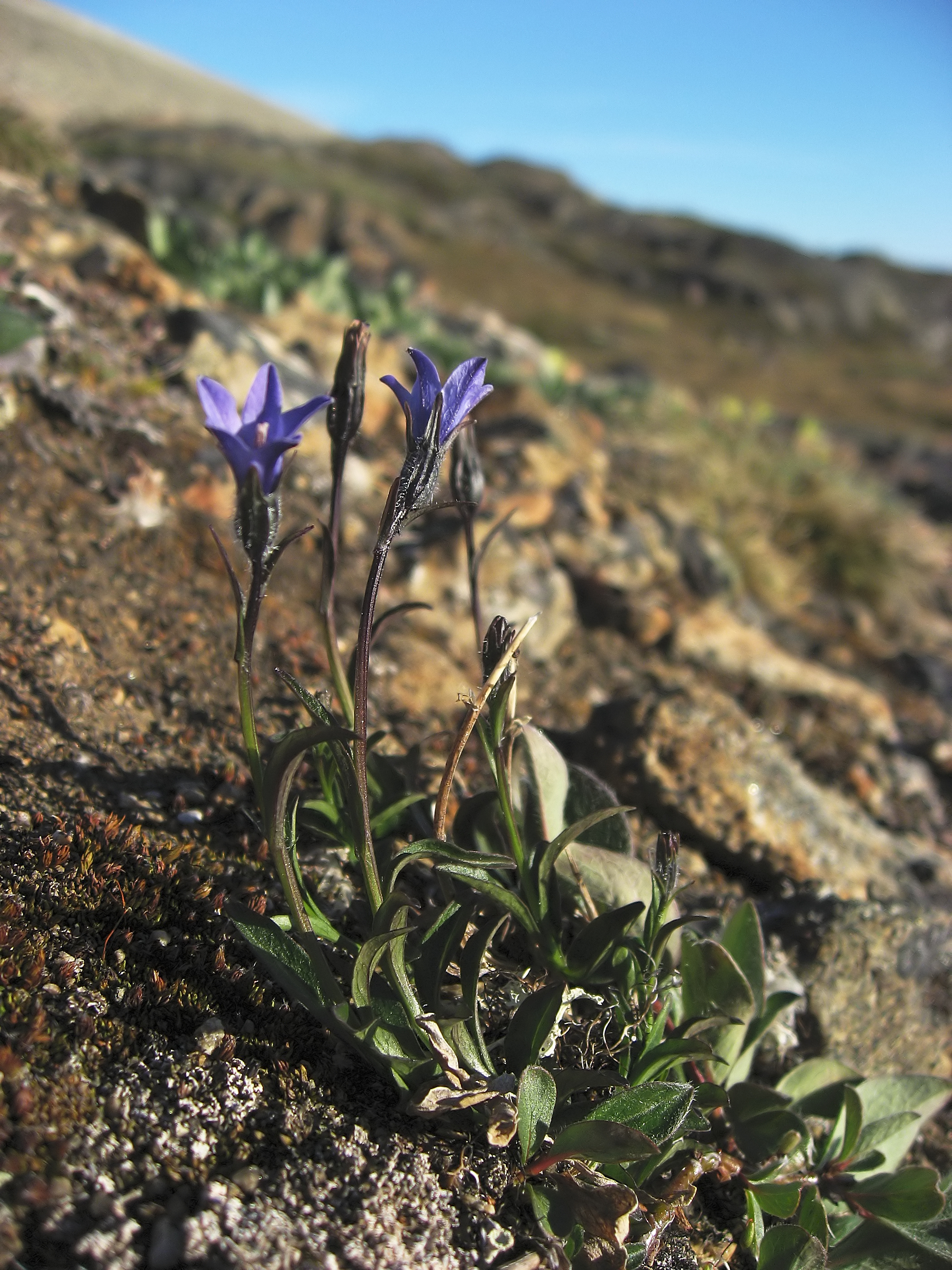
- In Upernavik, Greenland

Scientific classification
- Kingdom: Plantae
- Clade: Embryophytes
- Clade: Tracheophytes
- Clade: Spermatophytes
- Clade: Angiosperms
- Clade: Eudicots
- Clade: Asterids
- Order: Asterales
- Family: Campanulaceae
- Genus: Melanocalyx
- Species: M. uniflora

Binomial name
- Melanocalyx uniflora (L.) Morin

Synonyms
- Campanula uniflora L.

= Melanocalyx uniflora =

Plant species in the bellflower family

Melancalyx uniflora, known commonly as arctic bellflower and arctic harebell, is a short and slender rhizomatous perennial in the bellflower family Campanulaceae. It is distributed in arctic North America, including the Rocky Mountains and Greenland, in the Asian part of Beringia and in Iceland, Svalbard, the Scandes Mountains and Novaja Zemlja.

The species was recorded by Linnaeus on his 1732 expedition to Lapland and described in his Flora Lapponica (1737).

== Description ==
Arctic harebell is a small perennial, herbaceous plant measuring 5 to 14 centimeters tall. However, in the early 1900s some very tall specimens measuring 22 cm were collected on the southern coast of the Coronation Gulf in Northern Canada. Each plant has a very large and wrinkly main taproot off of which multiple underground stems grow to the soil surface where the rosettes of leaves grow. These underground stems are slender and have leaves that have been reduced to scales. In younger plants the top of the main root is closer to the soil surface with much shorter underground stems.

Its leaves are hairless and have either smooth or crenulate edges, very fine wavy teeth. Its basal leaves, those attached directly to the base of the plant, are oval to lanceolate, shaped like the head of a spear. They are about 2 cm in length and have very short petioles.

During blooming and for short time afterwards the top of the stem bends so that the flowers hang pointing downwards, but as the seed capsule develops the stem changes to hold it upright. The flowers are solitary at the end of each stem with petals that are fused into a funnel 15 to 18 millimeters long and blue in color.

In Iceland, Melanocalyx uniflora is a host of Pleospora herbarum, a common pathogenic fungus.

== Taxonomy ==
Campanula uniflora was scientifically described and named by Carl Linnaeus in Species Plantarum in 1753. In 2020 Nancy Ruth Morin moved it to a new genus named Melanocalyx and this is the accepted name listed in Plants of the World Online. However, Campanula uniflora continues to be listed as the accepted name in World Flora Online and the name used by organizations like NatureServe. Under this classification it is part of the genus Campanula in the family Campanulaceae.

=== Names ===
The species name is Botanical Latin meaning "one flowered". Campanula uniflora is known by the common names arctic harebell, arctic bellflower, and alpine harebell.

== Range ==
Melanocalyx uniflora is widespread in the northern hemisphere. In Europe it is native to the island nation of Iceland and the Fennoscandian Peninsula in the nations of Norway, Sweden, and Finland. In Norway they can be found as far south as 62° N, growing in an isolated population in the southern Scandinavian Mountains, but are more common in the north where they cross over into Sweden as well. It also is part of the flora of the Faroe Islands, Svalbard, North European Russia, and the Novaya Zemlya archipelago south of 74° N.

To the east in Asia the species is documented in the Russian Far East in Chita Oblast, the Sakha Republic, Khabarovsk Krai, Magadan Oblast and the neighboring Chukotka Autonomous Okrug, and the Kamchatka Peninsula. Across the Bering Strait in North America it is native to all of the far north from Alaska to Greenland. In Greenland it grows on both east and west coasts except for the very far south and is even rarely found on north side of the island. Further to the south it grows in the northern parts of Manitoba, Québec, and Labrador. In the west it grows down the Rocky Mountains through British Columbia and Alberta into the United States in Washington, Idaho, Montana, Utah, Wyoming, Colorado, and New Mexico.

It is a less common plant that prefers to grow in alkaline soils or rocks.
