= Akornat Strait =

Strait in Avannaata, Greenland

Coordinates: 72°42′N 55°40′W

Location within Greenland

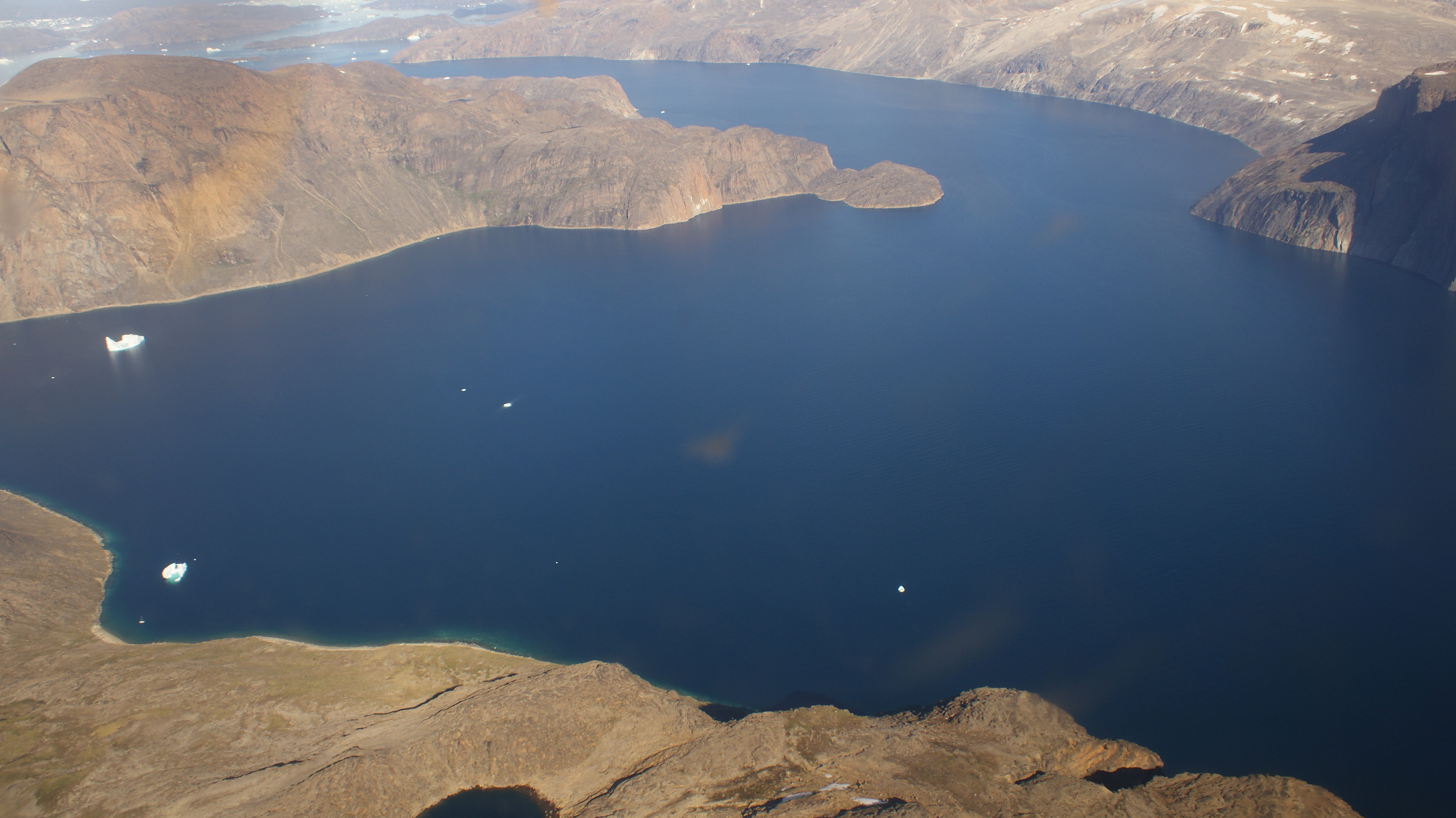
Aerial view of Akornat Strait

Akornat Strait (Danish: Sortenhul) is a strait in the Upernavik Archipelago in Avannaata municipality in northwestern Greenland. It separates Qaarsorsuaq Island in the northwest from Nutaarmiut Island in the southeast. The strait waterway opens into Baffin Bay in the southwest, and into the inner waterways of the archipelago in the northeast.
