= Akuliaruseq Peninsula =

Geographic feature of Greenland

Coordinates: 71°30′N 52°15′W

Akuliaruseq Peninsula is a peninsula in Avannaata municipality in northwestern Greenland. It is located in the Uummannaq Fjord region. It was visited by an Italian expedition in 1974. It is located to the north of the Qioqe Peninsula.
