= Mount Akuliaruseq =

Mountain in Kujalleq, Greenland

Akuliaruseq
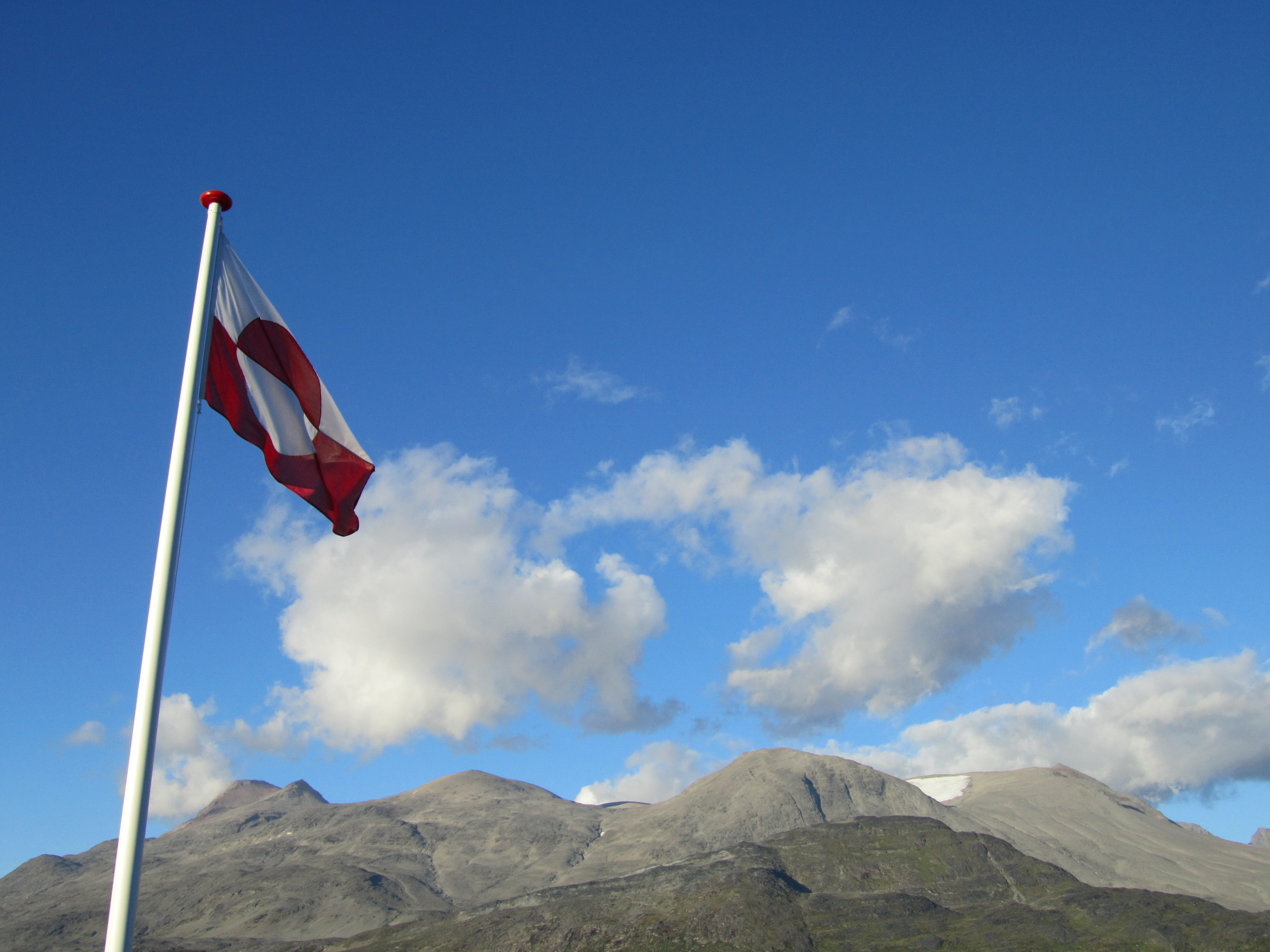
- Mount Akuliaruseq

Highest point
- Elevation: 1,352 m (4,436 ft)
- Coordinates: 60°17′N 44°28′W

Geography
- Location within Greenland
- Country: Greenland
- Municipality: Kujalleq

Akuliaruseq is a 1352 m high mountain in southern Greenland.
