= Akuliaruseq, Kujalleq =

Village in Greenland

Akulariuseq
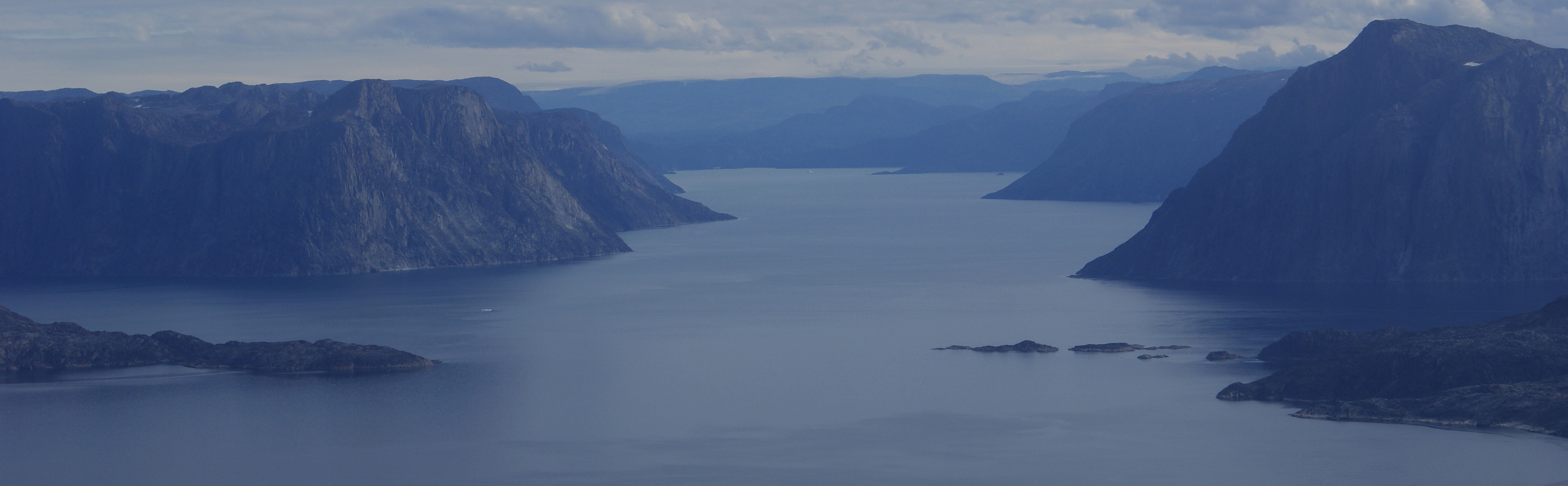
- Interactive map of Akulariuseq
- Coordinates: 60°28′N 45°30′W
- Country: Denmark
- Autonomous territory: Greenland
- Municipality: Kujalleq
- Abandoned: 2010
- Time zone: UTC-3

Akuliaruseq is an abandoned Greenland settlement (since 2010) and is part of the municipality of Kujalleq.
