= Upernavik =

Town in Greenland

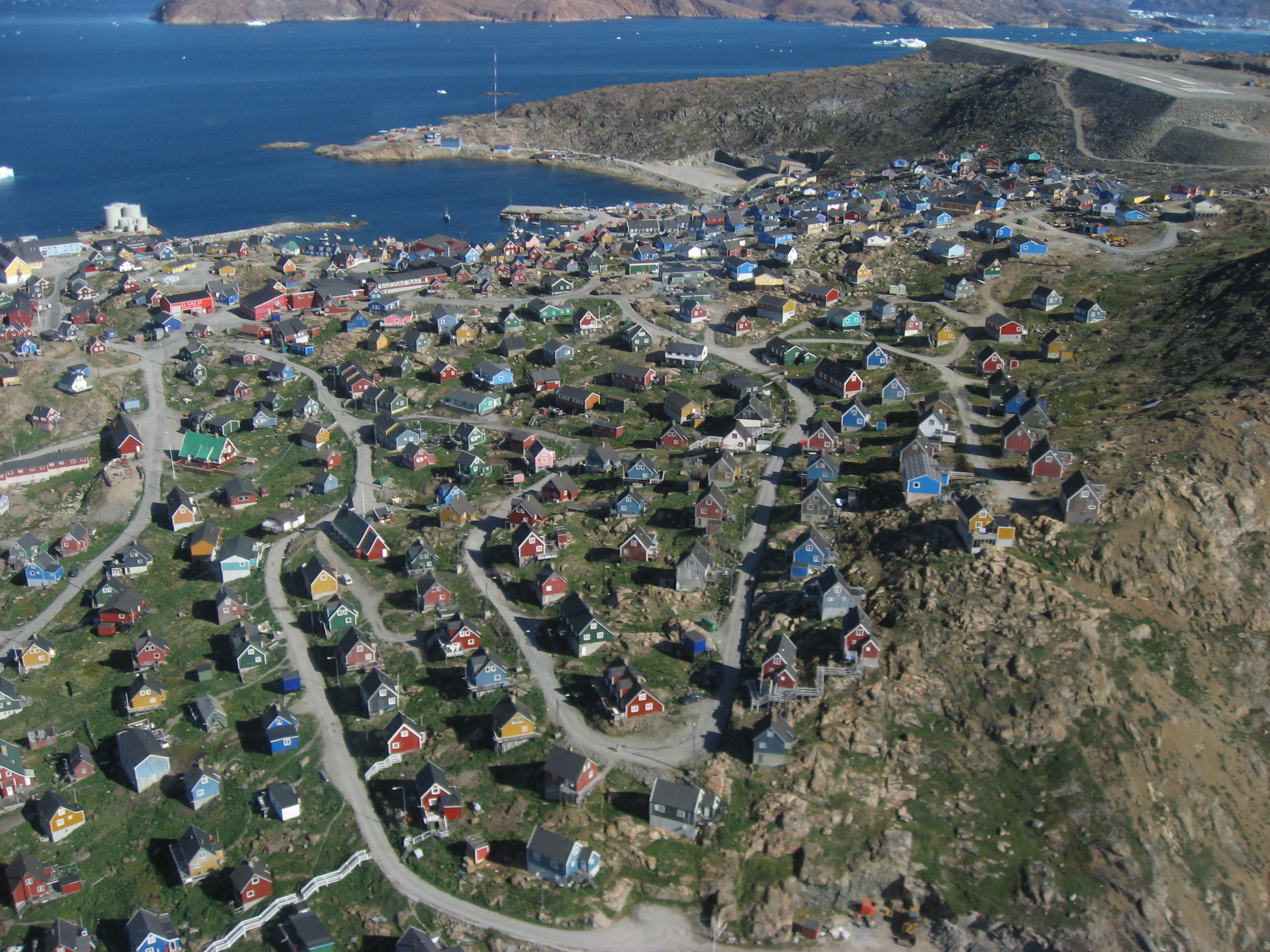
- Upernavik in July 2007

- Location within Greenland
- Coordinates: 72°47′13″N 56°08′50″W
- State: Kingdom of Denmark
- Constituent country: Greenland
- Municipality: Avannaata

Population (2025)
  - Total: 1,087
- Time zone: UTC−02:00 (Western Greenland Time)
  - Summer (DST): UTC−01:00 (Western Greenland Summer Time)
- Postal code: 3962

Upernavik is a small town in the Avannaata municipality in northwestern Greenland, located on a small island of the same name. With 1,087 inhabitants as of 2025, it is the twelfth-largest town in Greenland. It contains the Upernavik Museum.

== History ==
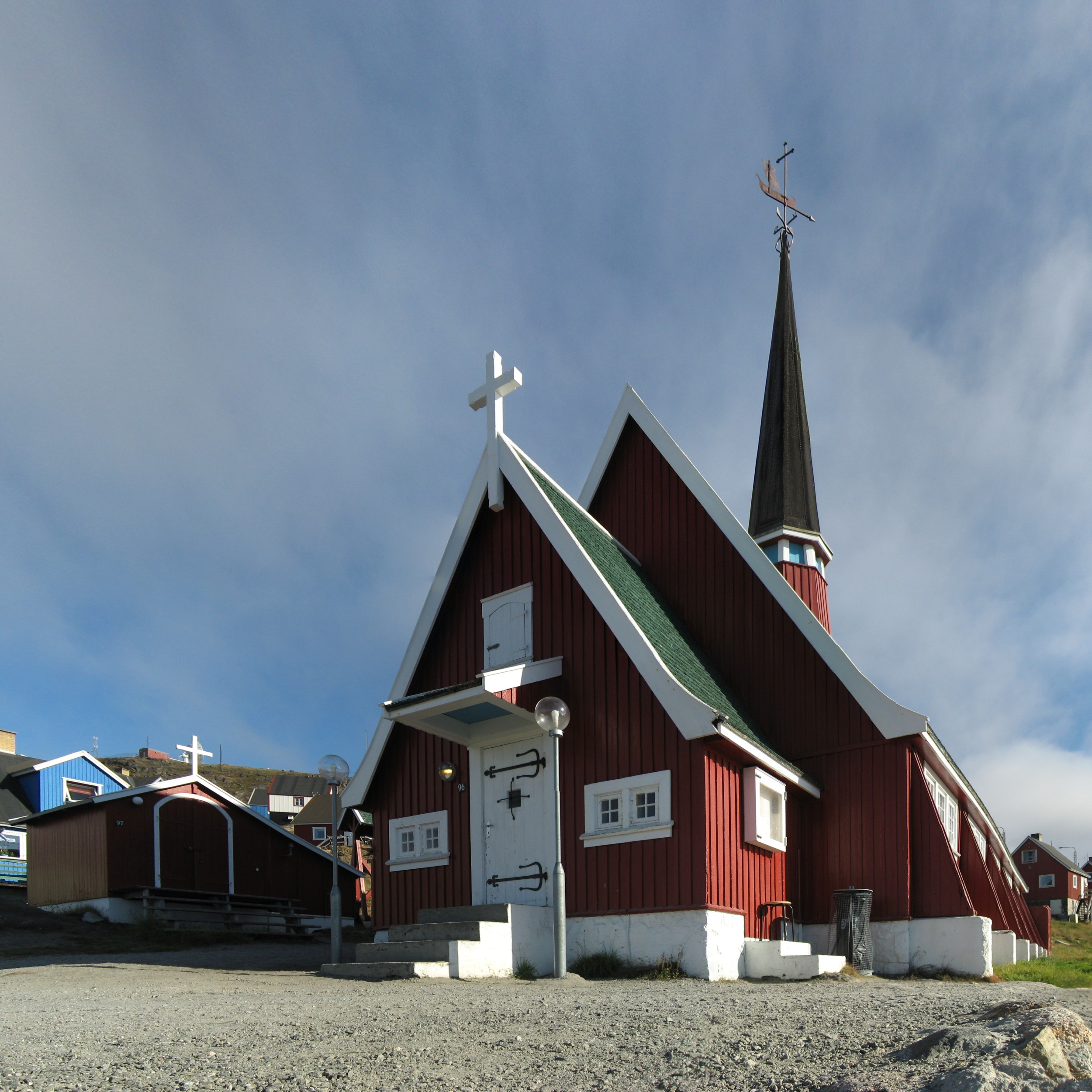
New church

The town was founded as Upernavik in 1772. From the former name of its island, it was sometimes known as Women's Island; its name was also sometimes Anglicized to "Uppernavik".

In 1824, the Kingittorsuaq Runestone was found outside the town. It bears runic characters left by Norsemen, probably from the late 13th century. The runic characters list the names of three Norsemen and mention the construction of a rock cairn nearby.

This is the furthest north that any Norse artifacts have been found, other than those small artifacts that could have been carried north by Inuit traders, and marks the northern known limit of Viking exploration.

Sailors searching for lost polar expeditions sometimes used the city as a staging ground.

== Transport ==
Upernavik is served by Air Greenland, with scheduled flights from Upernavik Airport to Qaanaaq, Qaarsut, and Ilulissat. Most settlements in the archipelago are served during weekdays with the Bell 212 helicopter.

AUL ferries have ceased passenger services north of Ilulissat, leaving Upernavik totally dependent on Air Greenland services, which are frequently cancelled due to weather conditions. Cargo arrives several times a year on Royal Arctic Line when sea ice permits, usually beginning in early to mid May annually.

== Archipelago ==
Upernavik is located within Upernavik Archipelago, a vast archipelago of small islands on the coast of northeastern Baffin Bay. The archipelago extends from the northwestern coast of Sigguup Nunaa peninsula in the south at approximately 71°50′N 56°00′W to the southern end of Melville Bay (Greenlandic: Qimusseriarsuaq) in the north at approximately 74°50′N 57°30′W.

== Population ==
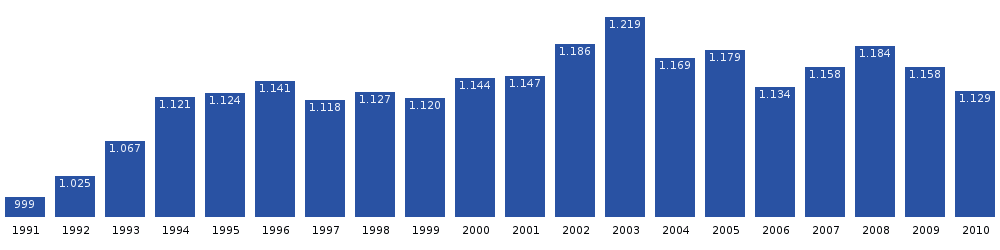
Population growth, 1991–2010

With 1,067 inhabitants as of 2025, Upernavik is the third-largest town in the Avannaata municipality. The population has been relatively stable over the last two decades and has increased by more than 28% relative to the 1990 levels, with migrants from the smaller settlements in the archipelago helping keep the population level stable. Cyclist Hanne Malmberg was born in Upernavik. She represented Denmark at the 1992 Summer Olympics.

== Climate ==
Upernavik has a tundra climate (Köppen climate classification ET). Winters are very cold and snowy and summers are quite cool. With a mean of just 6.4 °C (43.5 °F) in July, trees are unable to grow. Autumn and winter are the wettest time of the year and spring is the driest.

Climate data for Upernavik (1991–2020 normals, extremes 1958–2020)
Month	Jan	Feb	Mar	Apr	May	Jun	Jul	Aug	Sep	Oct	Nov	Dec	Year
Record high °C (°F)	11.0 (51.8)	8.0 (46.4)	10.0 (50.0)	9.4 (48.9)	15.0 (59.0)	18.0 (64.4)	22.6 (72.7)	19.9 (67.8)	14.3 (57.7)	13.0 (55.4)	9.6 (49.3)	12.2 (54.0)	22.6 (72.7)
Mean daily maximum °C (°F)	−14.3 (6.3)	−16.5 (2.3)	−16.0 (3.2)	−8.9 (16.0)	−0.9 (30.4)	6.2 (43.2)	9.4 (48.9)	8.2 (46.8)	3.3 (37.9)	−1.8 (28.8)	−5.9 (21.4)	−9.4 (15.1)	−3.9 (25.0)
Daily mean °C (°F)	−16.7 (1.9)	−19.2 (−2.6)	−19.0 (−2.2)	−11.9 (10.6)	−3.3 (26.1)	3.2 (37.8)	6.4 (43.5)	5.7 (42.3)	1.4 (34.5)	−3.4 (25.9)	−7.6 (18.3)	−11.4 (11.5)	−6.3 (20.6)
Mean daily minimum °C (°F)	−18.9 (−2.0)	−21.6 (−6.9)	−21.7 (−7.1)	−14.7 (5.5)	−5.5 (22.1)	0.6 (33.1)	3.8 (38.8)	3.6 (38.5)	−0.2 (31.6)	−4.9 (23.2)	−9.2 (15.4)	−13.3 (8.1)	−8.5 (16.7)
Record low °C (°F)	−34.9 (−30.8)	−38.4 (−37.1)	−39.0 (−38.2)	−30.2 (−22.4)	−22.6 (−8.7)	−7.5 (18.5)	−4.0 (24.8)	−3.8 (25.2)	−12.2 (10.0)	−14.5 (5.9)	−25.6 (−14.1)	−31.6 (−24.9)	−39.0 (−38.2)
Average precipitation mm (inches)	12 (0.5)	13 (0.5)	8 (0.3)	14 (0.6)	10 (0.4)	14 (0.6)	29 (1.1)	26 (1.0)	38 (1.5)	33 (1.3)	34 (1.3)	20 (0.8)	251 (9.9)
Average precipitation days (≥ 0.1 mm)	9.1	8.6	6.9	9.1	8.3	7.6	9.2	8.7	12.6	13.5	16.2	14.9	123.4
Average snowy days	9.0	8.5	6.7	9.0	7.8	5.5	1.0	0.7	8.2	12.8	15.9	14.7	98.4
Average relative humidity (%)	80.6	80.7	79.3	80.0	83.8	80.3	77.7	77.9	79.0	80.0	78.4	79.9	79.8
Mean monthly sunshine hours	0	18	106	214	234	225	271	214	104	38	2	0	1,426
Source: Danish Meteorological Institute (precipitation and snow 1958–1981, humidity 2005-2020, sun 1931–1960)
