= Kangeq Peninsula =

Peninsula in Greenland

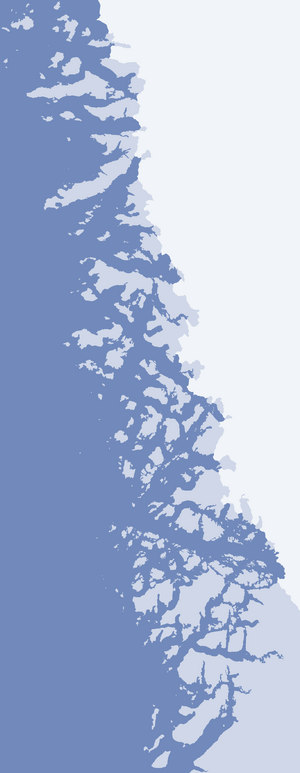
- Location within Upernavik Archipelago

Geography
- Location: West Greenland
- Coordinates: 72°27′N 55°10′W
- Adjacent to: Baffin Bay

Administration
- Greenland (Denmark)
- Municipality: Avannaata

Demographics
- Population: Uninhabited

Kangeq Peninsula is a peninsula of Greenland. It is located in the Upernavik Archipelago. The Kangerlussuaq Fjord (Kangeq Peninsula) cuts across the peninsula in a north–south direction.
