= Upernavik Island =

Island in Greenland

Coordinates: 72°47′N 56°09′W

Upernavik Island is an island of Greenland. It is located in Baffin Bay in the Upernavik Archipelago. The town of Upernavik is on the island.

It used to be known as Women's Island or Woman's Island.
