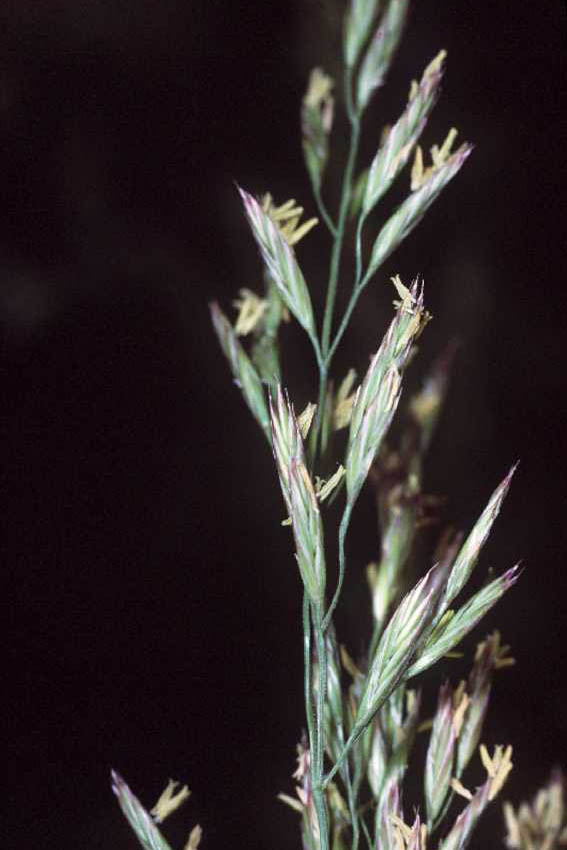
- Festuca pratensis

Scientific classification
- Kingdom: Plantae
- Clade: Tracheophytes
- Clade: Angiosperms
- Clade: Monocots
- Clade: Commelinids
- Order: Poales
- Family: Poaceae
- Subfamily: Pooideae
- Supertribe: Poodae
- Tribe: Poeae
- Subtribe: Loliinae
- Genus: Festuca; Tourn. ex L. (1753)

Synonyms
- Synonymy: Amphigenes Janka (1860); Anatherum Nábelek (1929), nom. illeg.; Argillochloa W.A.Weber (1984); Asprella Host (1809), nom. illeg.; Chloamnia Raf. (1825); Ctenopsis De Not. (1847); Dasiola Raf. (1825); Dielsiochloa Pilg. (1943); Distomomischus Dulac (1867); Drymochloa Holub (1984); Festucaria Link (1844), nom. illeg.; Festucaria Heist. ex Fabr. (1759); × Festulpia Melderis ex Stace & R.Cotton (1974); Gramen E.H.L.Krause (1914), nom. illeg.; Helleria E.Fourn. (1886), nom. illeg.; Hellerochloa Rauschert (1982); Hesperochloa (Piper) Rydb. (1912); Leiopoa Ohwi (1932); Leucopoa Griseb. (1852); Loliolum V.I.Krecz. & Bobrov (1934); Loretia Duval-Jouve (1880); Micropyrum (Gaudin) Link (1844); Mygalurus Link (1821); Nabelekia Roshev. (1937); Narduretia Villar (1925); Narduroides Rouy (1913); Nardurus (Bluff, Nees & Schauer) Rchb. (1841); Podophorus Phil. (1856); Prosphysis Dulac (1867), nom. superfl.; Psilurus Trin. (1820); Tragus Panz. (1813), nom. illeg.; Vulpia C.C.Gmel. (1805); Wasatchia M.E.Jones (1912), nom. superfl.; Zerna Panz. (1813), nom. superfl.

= Festuca =

Genus of flowering plants

Festuca (fescue) is a genus of flowering plants belonging to the grass family Poaceae (subfamily Pooideae). They are evergreen, herbaceous, or perennial, tufted grasses with a height range of 10–200 cm (4–79 in) and a cosmopolitan distribution, occurring on every continent except Antarctica. The genus is closely related to ryegrass (Lolium), and recent evidence from phylogenetic studies using DNA sequencing of plant mitochondrial DNA shows that the genus lacks monophyly. As a result, plant taxonomists have moved several species, including the forage grasses tall fescue and meadow fescue, from the genus Festuca into the genus Lolium or alternatively into the segregated genus Schedonorus.

Because the taxonomy is complex, scientists have not determined how many true species belong to the genus, but estimates range from more than 400 to over 640.

Fescue pollen is a significant contributor to hay fever.

== Taxonomy ==
The genus Festuca represents a major evolutionary line of the tribe Poeae. The ancient group has produced various segregates that possess more advanced characteristics than Festuca, including racemose inflorescences and more annual habits.

The word "festuca" is a Latin word meaning "stem" or "stalk", first used by Pliny the Elder to describe a weed. The word Festuca first appears to describe grasses in Dodoens' "Stirpium historiae pemptades sex, sive libri XXX" in 1583. However, the plant Dodoens described as Festuca altera is truly Bromus secalinus. Other authors before Linnaeus used the name to describe other various species of Bromus. In the first edition of Genera Plantarum, Linnaeus describes seven species of Festuca, five of which are truly Bromus grasses, with the other two being Festuca gigantea and Festuca pratensis. In 1753, the genus is accepted as first being formally described, in Linnaeus' "Species Plantarum". Eleven species were described, with F. ovina being the type species. Of these 11, one species was Danthonia, one Poa, and one Koeleria. The first major monograph on the genus was Hackel's "Monographia Festucarum Europaearum" in 1882. Since Linnaeus' publications, seven genera have been proposed for groups of perennial fescues and 15 for annual fescues, all with varying degrees of acceptance. For example in 1906, the subgenus Vulpia was introduced for North American species. The annual habit and shorter anthers of Vulpia have since been enough to distinguish Vulpia as a separate genus from Festuca.

The taxonomy of the genus is ultimately problematic and controversial, as evidenced by the large number of small genera closely related to Festuca. Often, distinguishing species within the genus requires the analysis of highly specific morphological differences on characters such as ovary pubescence or leaf sclerenchyma patterns. This distribution of sclerenchyma tissue is an important distinguishing characteristic between species, and though species can be locally distinguished without analyzing these characteristics, to distinguish the genus as a whole, the analysis is necessary.

== Description ==
Festuca grasses are perennial and bisexual plants that are densely to loosely cespitose. Some grasses are rhizomatous, some lack rhizomes, and rarely species are stoloniferous. The culms of the grasses are typically glabrous and smooth, though some species have scabrous culms or culms that are pubescent below the inflorescences. The leaf sheaths range from open to the base to closed to the top. Some species have sheaths that persist over years and typically have deciduous blades, and some species have sheaths that quickly shred into fibers and decay in senescence and typically have blades that are not deciduous. Species lack auricles. The membranous ligules measure 0.1–8 mm (0.0039–0.3150 in) and are typically longest at the margins. The ligules are typically truncate and ciliate, though they can occasionally be acute or erose. The flat and conduplicate leaf blades are involute or convolute and are sometimes glaucous or pruinose. The abaxial surfaces of leaf blades are glabrous or scabrous and occasionally pubescent or puberulent. The adaxial surfaces of leaf blades are typically scabrous, though occasionally are hirsute or puberulent. The abaxial sclerenchyma tissue forms longitudinal strands that vary in presence from the margins and opposite of the midvein to adjacent to some or every lateral vein. These longitudinal strands occasionally merge into interrupted or continuous bands. Bands of confluent strands that reach veins are known as "pillars". The adaxial sclerenchyma tissue sometimes forms strands that are opposite or extend to epidermal veins. Some strands form "girders" together with the abaxial sclerenchyma tissue that connect epidermides at some or all veins.

The inflorescences of species are open or contracted panicles, occasionally racemes, with one to two (rarely three) branches at their lower node. The branches are erect and begin to spread during anthesis, and occasionally lower branches are reflexed. The spikelets have 2–12, mostly bisexual florets. The rachillas are typically either scabrous or pubescent, but can occasionally be smooth and glabrous. The subequal or unequal glumes are ovate to lanceolate, acute to acuminate, and are typically exceeded by the florets. The lower glumes are as long or shorter than their adjacent lemmas and have one (rarely two or three) veins, and the upper glumes have three (rarely four or five) veins. The calli are typically glabrous and smooth, but can be occasionally scabrous or rarely pubescent. The chartaceous or sometimes coriaceous lemmas have somewhat dorsally rounded and distally keeled bases. The lemmas typically have five (rarely six or seven) veins. The lemmas have acute to attenuate apices that are occasionally doubly pointed, and terminal awns or mucros. The bidentate paleas are shorter to longer than the lemmas, with scabrous-ciliate veins. The regions between the veins are smooth and glabrous near the base of the paleas and become scabrous or puberulent distally. All grasses have three anthers. The ovaries are glabrous with occasionally hispidulous apices on which hairs persist when ovaries become caryopses. The oblong caryopses have adaxial grooves. The linear hila vary in length from half as long to as long as the caryopses.

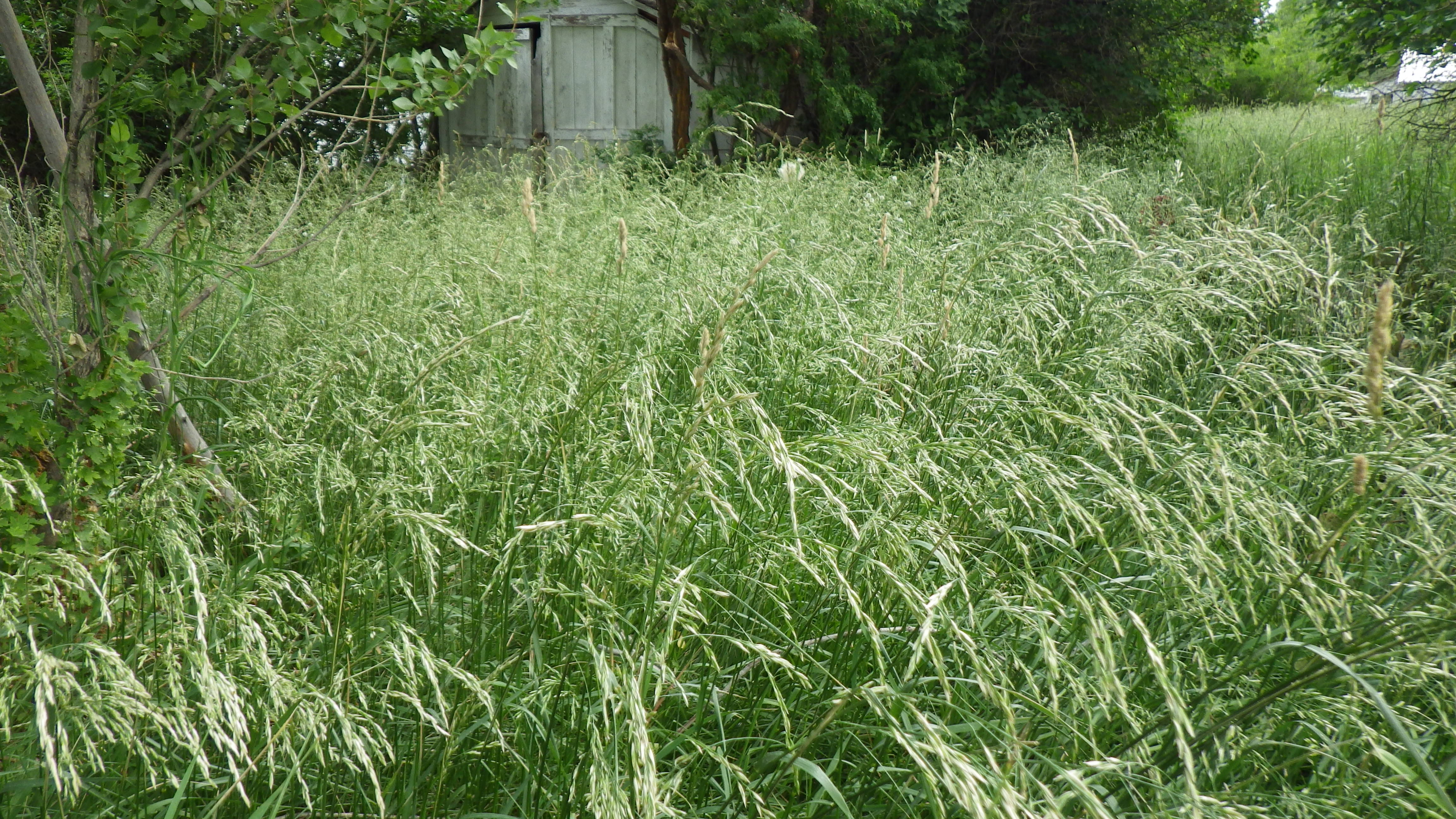
Fescue grass, Montana

== Uses ==
Some fescues are used as ornamental and turf grasses and as pasture and hay for livestock, being a highly nutritious stock feed. Festuca rubra and F. rubra subsp. commutata are used as lawn grasses, and these species, F. arundinacea and F. trachyphylla, are used in parks, deforested areas, and sports fields for land stabilization. F. saximontana and F. idahoensis are used as rangeland grasses for livestock, and fescues often provide good forage for native wildlife. F. ovina and its various subspecies are the most important grazing fescues for North America, and F. arundinacea is one of the most important hay and pasture grasses in Europe.

Fescue quickly establishes on bare ground, suffocating native plants, and persists over several years. Native grassland plants take years to establish deep root system of 5–15 feet (species specific), while fescue roots maximum depth is 2–3 feet. Historically used in soil erosion control programs, Tall fescue (F. arundinacea) particularly, 'Kentucky 31', a cultivar species, was used in land reclamation during the Dust Bowl of the 1930s in the US, triggered by the removal of deep root systems for row crop cultivation. Fescues have been used as building material, as rope and as a variety of other things in indigenous Ethiopian communities, in particular the Guassa Community Conservation Area where it is referred to as 'Guassa Grass'. The grasses F. amethystina, F. cinerea, F. elegans, F. glauca, and F. pallens are all grown as ornamentals.

Fescue is sometimes used as feed for horses. However, fescue poisoning, caused by ergot alkaloids produced by the endophytic fungus Epichloë coenophiala, is a risk for pregnant mares. During the last three months of pregnancy fescue poisoning increases the risk of spontaneous abortion, stillbirths, retained placenta, absent milk production, and prolonged pregnancy. Incorporating legumes into the fescue can be a way to increase livestock gains and conception rates, even if the fescue is infected.

== Infrageneric ranks ==
Infrageneric ranks:

- Festuca sect. Amphigenes (Janka) Tzvelev
- Festuca sect. Aristulatae E.B. Alexeev
- Festuca subg. Asperifolia E.B. Alexeev 1981
- Festuca sect. Atropis (Trin.) 1936
- Festuca sect. Aulaxyper Dumort.
- Festuca subg. Austrofestuca Tzvelev 1971
- Festuca sect. Banksia E.B. Alexeev 1984
- Festuca [unranked] Bovinae Fr. ex Andersson 1852
- Festuca sect. Bovinae (Fr. ex Andersson) Hack. 1882
- Festuca sect. Breviaristatae Krivot. 1960
- Festuca sect. Bromochloa Drejer

== Species ==
Over 660 species are currently accepted. Species include:

- Festuca abyssinica A.Rich.
- Festuca actae Connor
- Festuca alatavica (St.-Yves) Roshev.
- Festuca aloha Catalán, Soreng & P.M.Peterson – aloha fescue
- Festuca alpina Suter – alpine fescue
- Festuca altaica Trin. – northern rough fescue, Altai fescue
- Festuca altissima All. – wood fescue
- Festuca amethystina L. – tufted fescue
- Festuca ampla Hack.
- Festuca amplissima Rupr. ex Galeotti
- Festuca arenaria Osbeck – rush-leaf fescue
- Festuca argentina (Speg.) Parodi
- Festuca arizonica Vasey – Arizona fescue, pinegrass
- Festuca armoricana Kerguélen
- Festuca arvernensis Auquier, Kerguélen & Markgr.-Dann. – field fescue
- Festuca baffinensis – Baffin Island fescue
- Festuca beckeri
- Festuca brachyphylla – alpine fescue, rock fescue
- Festuca breviglumis – Swallen
- Festuca brunnescens
- Festuca burnatii
- Festuca caerulescens
- Festuca caldasii
- Festuca californica – California fescue
- Festuca callieri
- Festuca calligera – southwestern fescue
- Festuca campestris – mountain rough fescue
- Festuca caprina
- Festuca chimborazensis
- Festuca cinerea
- Festuca circinata
- Festuca contracta – tufted fescue
- Festuca cretacea
- Festuca cumminsii
- Festuca chrysophylla
- Festuca dahurica
- Festuca dasyclada – oil shale fescue
- Festuca densipaniculata
- Festuca dimorpha
- Festuca djimilensis
- Festuca dolichophylla
- Festuca donax
- Festuca drymeja
- Festuca durissima
- Festuca earlei – Earle's fescue
- Festuca edlundiae – Edlund's fescue
- Festuca elegans
- Festuca elmeri – coast fescue
- Festuca eskia
- Festuca extremiorientalis
- Festuca filiformis – fine-leaved sheep's fescue
- Festuca flacca
- Festuca frederikseniae
- Festuca gautieri – bearskin fescue
- Festuca gigantea – giant fescue
- Festuca glacialis
- Festuca glauca – blue fescue, gray fescue
- Festuca glumosa
- Festuca gracillima
- Festuca hallii – plains rough fescue
- Festuca hawaiiensis – Hawaii fescue
- Festuca heterophylla – various-leaved fescue, shade fescue
- Festuca hyperborea – boreal fescue
- Festuca hystrix
- Festuca idahoensis – Idaho fescue, blue bunchgrass
- Festuca indigesta
- Festuca jubata – Macaronesia fescue
- Festuca juncifolia
- Festuca kingii – spike fescue
- Festuca komarovii
- Festuca kurtziana
- Festuca laxa
- Festuca lemanii – confused fescue
- Festuca lenensis – tundra fescue
- Festuca ligulata – Guadalupe fescue
- Festuca litvinovii
- Festuca longifolia – blue fescue
- Festuca longipes
- Festuca lucida
- Festuca magellanica
- Festuca mairei – Atlas fescue
- Festuca matthewsii – alpine fescue tussock
- Festuca minutiflora – smallflower fescue
- Festuca molokaiensis – Moloka'i fescue
- Festuca monticola
- Festuca muelleri
- Festuca multinodis
- Festuca nigrescens – alpine Chewing's fescue
- Festuca novae-zelandiae – fescue tussock
- Festuca occidentalis – western fescue
- Festuca octoflora
- Festuca ovina – sheep's fescue
- Festuca pallens
- Festuca pallescens
- Festuca panciciana
- Festuca paradoxa – cluster fescue
- Festuca parciflora
- Festuca perennis– (historical) perennial and Italian ryegrass
- Festuca petraea – Azorean fescue
- Festuca picturata
- Festuca pilgeri
- Festuca polycolea
- Festuca porcii
- Festuca procera
- Festuca psammophila
- Festuca pseudoeskia
- Festuca pseudodalmatica
- Festuca pseudodura
- Festuca pseudovina – pseudovina
- Festuca pulchella
- Festuca punctoria
- Festuca purpurascens
- Festuca pyrenaica
- Festuca quadriflora
- Festuca richardsonii – arctic fescue
- Festuca riccerii
- Festuca rigescens
- Festuca rivularis
- Festuca rubra – red fescue
  - Festuca rubra subsp. commutata – Chewing's fescue
- Festuca rupicaprina
- Festuca rupicola – furrowed fescue
- Festuca saximontana – Rocky Mountain fescue
- Festuca scabra – munnik fescue
- Festuca scabriuscula
- Festuca scariosa
- Festuca sclerophylla
- Festuca sibirica
- Festuca sinensis
- Festuca sodiroana
- Festuca sororia – ravine fescue
- Festuca spectabilis
- Festuca stricta
- Festuca subulata – bearded fescue
- Festuca subuliflora – crinkle-awn fescue
- Festuca subulifolia
- Festuca subverticillata – nodding fescue
- Festuca tatrae
- Festuca thurberi – Thurber's fescue
- Festuca trachyphylla
- Festuca vaginalis
- Festuca vaginata
- Festuca valesiaca – Volga fescue
- Festuca varia
- Festuca venusta
- Festuca versuta – Texas fescue
- Festuca violacea
- Festuca viridula – green fescue
- Festuca vivipara – viviparous fescue
- Festuca viviparoidea – northern fescue
- Festuca washingtonica – Washington fescue
- Festuca weberbaueri
- Festuca xanthina
- Festuca yalaensis

=== Formerly placed here ===
Several former Festuca species are now placed in other genera, including species from subgenus Schedonorus.

- Locajonoa coerulescens (Desf.) Soreng (as Festuca coerulescens Desf.)
- Lolium arundinaceum (Schreb.) Darbysh. (as Festuca arundinacea Schreb. and Festuca elatior L.) – tall fescue
- Lolium giganteum (L.) Darbysh. (as Festuca gigantea (L.) Vill.) – giant fescue
- Lolium mazzettianum (E.B.Alexeev) Darbysh. (as Festuca mazzettiana E.B.Alexeev)
- Lolium pratense (Huds.) Darbysh. (as Festuca pratensis Huds.) – meadow fescue, English bluegrass
