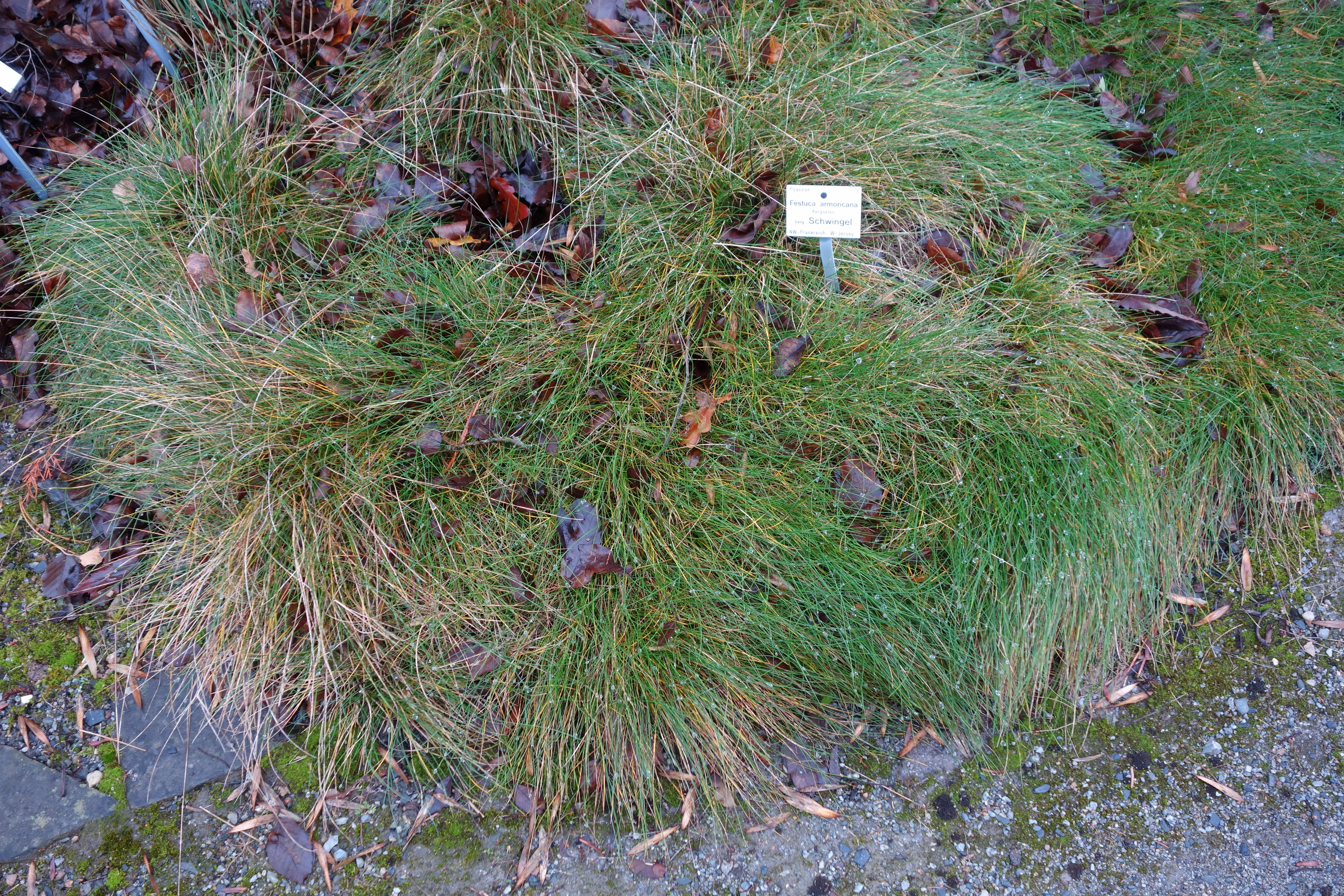

Scientific classification
- Kingdom: Plantae
- Clade: Tracheophytes
- Clade: Angiosperms
- Clade: Monocots
- Clade: Commelinids
- Order: Poales
- Family: Poaceae
- Subfamily: Pooideae
- Genus: Festuca
- Species: F. armoricana

Binomial name
- Festuca armoricana Kerguélen

= Festuca armoricana =

Species of grass

Festuca armoricana, the Breton fescue, is a species of grass endemic to Europe. It was first described in 1975 by Kerguélen.

== Characteristics ==
It is a densely-clumped perennial with culms 9–36 cm long.
