= Festuca sclerophylla =

Scientific classification
- Kingdom: Plantae
- Clade: Tracheophytes
- Clade: Angiosperms
- Clade: Monocots
- Clade: Commelinids
- Order: Poales
- Family: Poaceae
- Subfamily: Pooideae
- Genus: Festuca
- Species: F. sclerophylla

Binomial name
- Festuca sclerophylla Boiss. ex Bisch. (1849)

Species of grass

Festuca sclerophylla is a species of grass in the family Poaceae. It is native to western Asia, from eastern Türkiye to Afghanistan. It is perennial and grows in temperate biomes.
