= Festuca quadriflora =

Scientific classification
- Kingdom: Plantae
- Clade: Tracheophytes
- Clade: Angiosperms
- Clade: Monocots
- Clade: Commelinids
- Order: Poales
- Family: Poaceae
- Subfamily: Pooideae
- Genus: Festuca
- Species: F. quadriflora

Binomial name
- Festuca quadriflora Honck.

Species of grass

Festuca quadriflora is a species of grass in the family Poaceae. It is native to Central Pyrenees and Alps. It is perennial and grows in temperate biomes. It was first described in 1782.
