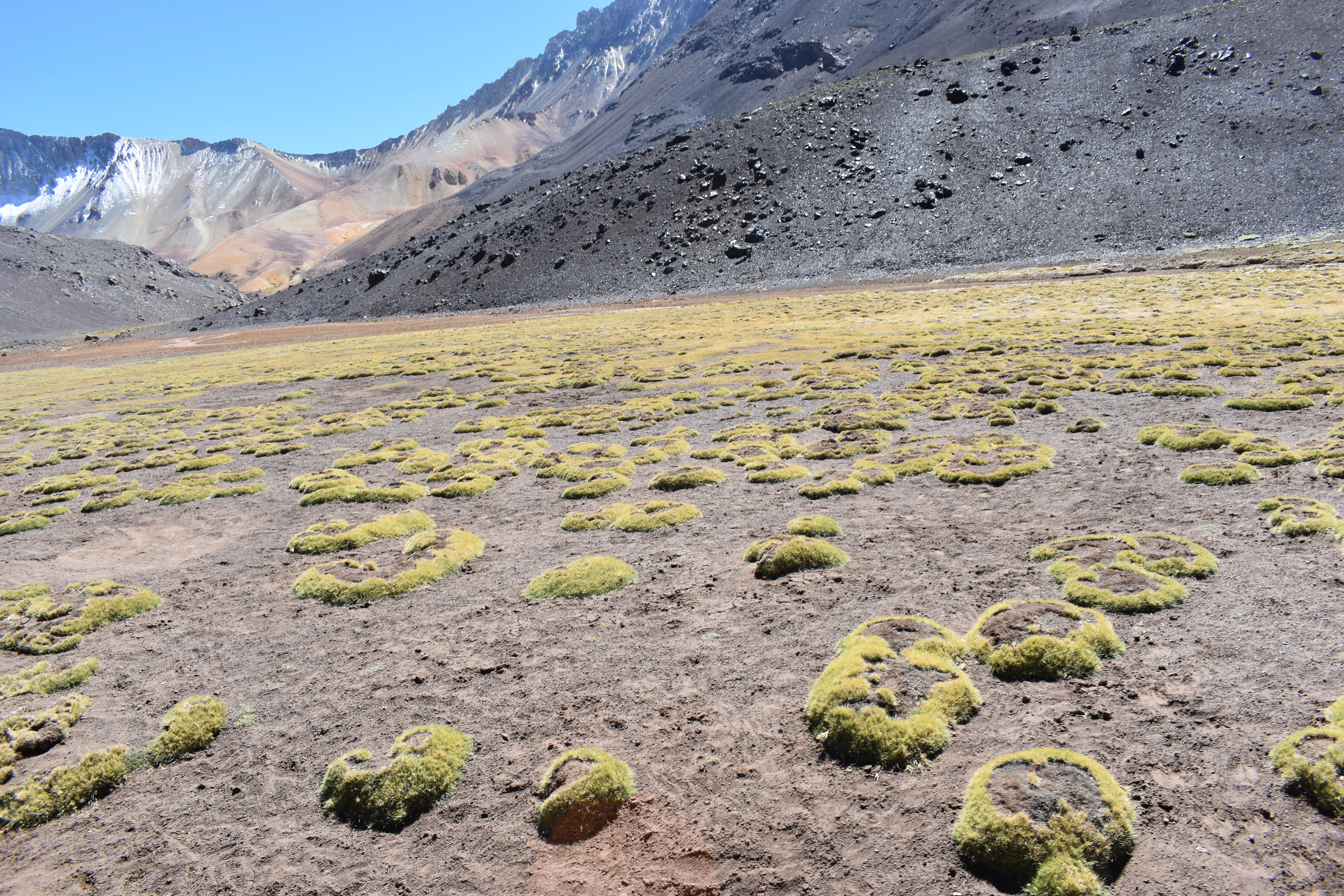

Scientific classification
- Kingdom: Plantae
- Clade: Tracheophytes
- Clade: Angiosperms
- Clade: Monocots
- Clade: Commelinids
- Order: Poales
- Family: Poaceae
- Subfamily: Pooideae
- Genus: Festuca
- Species: F. kurtziana

Binomial name
- Festuca kurtziana St.-Yves

= Festuca kurtziana =

Species of grass

Festuca kurtziana is a species of grass in the family Poaceae. It is native to Argentina, and Central Chile. It is perennial and mainly grows on subalpine or subarctic biomes. It was first published in 1927.
