= Festuca monticola =

Scientific classification
- Kingdom: Plantae
- Clade: Tracheophytes
- Clade: Angiosperms
- Clade: Monocots
- Clade: Commelinids
- Order: Poales
- Family: Poaceae
- Subfamily: Pooideae
- Genus: Festuca
- Species: F. monticola

Binomial name
- Festuca monticola Phil.

Synonyms
- Festuca gracillima var. monticola; Festuca subandina

Species of grass

Festuca monticola is a species of grass in the family Poaceae. It is native to South Chile and South Argentina. It is perennial and grows in temperate biomes. This species was first described in 1873 by Rodolfo Amando Philippi. No subspecies are listed in the Catalog of Life.
