= Festuca pseudoeskia =

Scientific classification
- Kingdom: Plantae
- Clade: Tracheophytes
- Clade: Angiosperms
- Clade: Monocots
- Clade: Commelinids
- Order: Poales
- Family: Poaceae
- Subfamily: Pooideae
- Genus: Festuca
- Species: F. pseudeskia

Binomial name
- Festuca pseudeskia Boiss. (1838)

Species of grass

Festuca pseudeskia is a species of grass in the family Poaceae. It is endemic to the Sierra Nevada of southern Spain.
