= Festuca stricta =

Scientific classification
- Kingdom: Plantae
- Clade: Embryophytes
- Clade: Tracheophytes
- Clade: Spermatophytes
- Clade: Angiosperms
- Clade: Monocots
- Clade: Commelinids
- Order: Poales
- Family: Poaceae
- Subfamily: Pooideae
- Genus: Festuca
- Species: F. stricta

Binomial name
- Festuca stricta Host

Species of grass

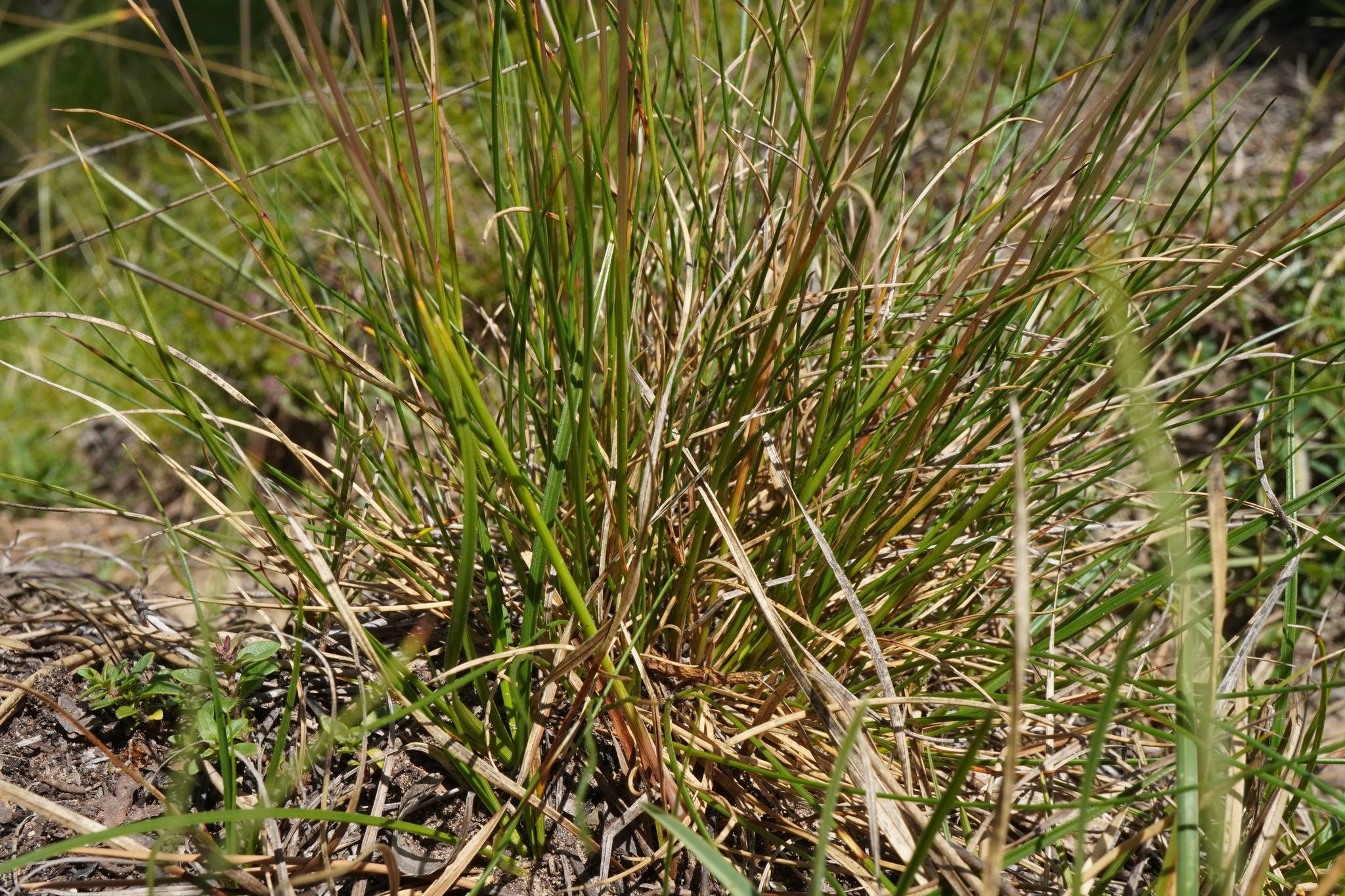

Festuca stricta is a species of grass in the family Poaceae. It is native to Europe. It is perennial and grows in temperate biomes. It was first described in 1802.
