= Festuca longipes =

Scientific classification
- Kingdom: Plantae
- Clade: Tracheophytes
- Clade: Angiosperms
- Clade: Monocots
- Clade: Commelinids
- Order: Poales
- Family: Poaceae
- Subfamily: Pooideae
- Genus: Festuca
- Species: F. longipes

Binomial name
- Festuca longipes Stapf

Synonyms
- Festuca costata var. fascicularis Nees in Fl. Afr. Austral. Ill.: 447 (1841)

Species of grass

Festuca longipes is a species of grass in the family Poaceae. It is native to South Africa. It is perennial and mainly grows in subtropical biomes. Festuca longipes was first published in 1900 by Otto Stapf.
