= Festuca sororia =

Scientific classification
- Kingdom: Plantae
- Clade: Tracheophytes
- Clade: Angiosperms
- Clade: Monocots
- Clade: Commelinids
- Order: Poales
- Family: Poaceae
- Subfamily: Pooideae
- Genus: Festuca
- Species: F. sororia

Binomial name
- Festuca sororia Piper

Species of grass

Festuca sororia is a species of grass in the family Poaceae. It is native to the U.S. states of California, Missouri and New Mexico. It is perennial and prefers to grow in subalpine or subarctic biomes. It was first described in 1913.
