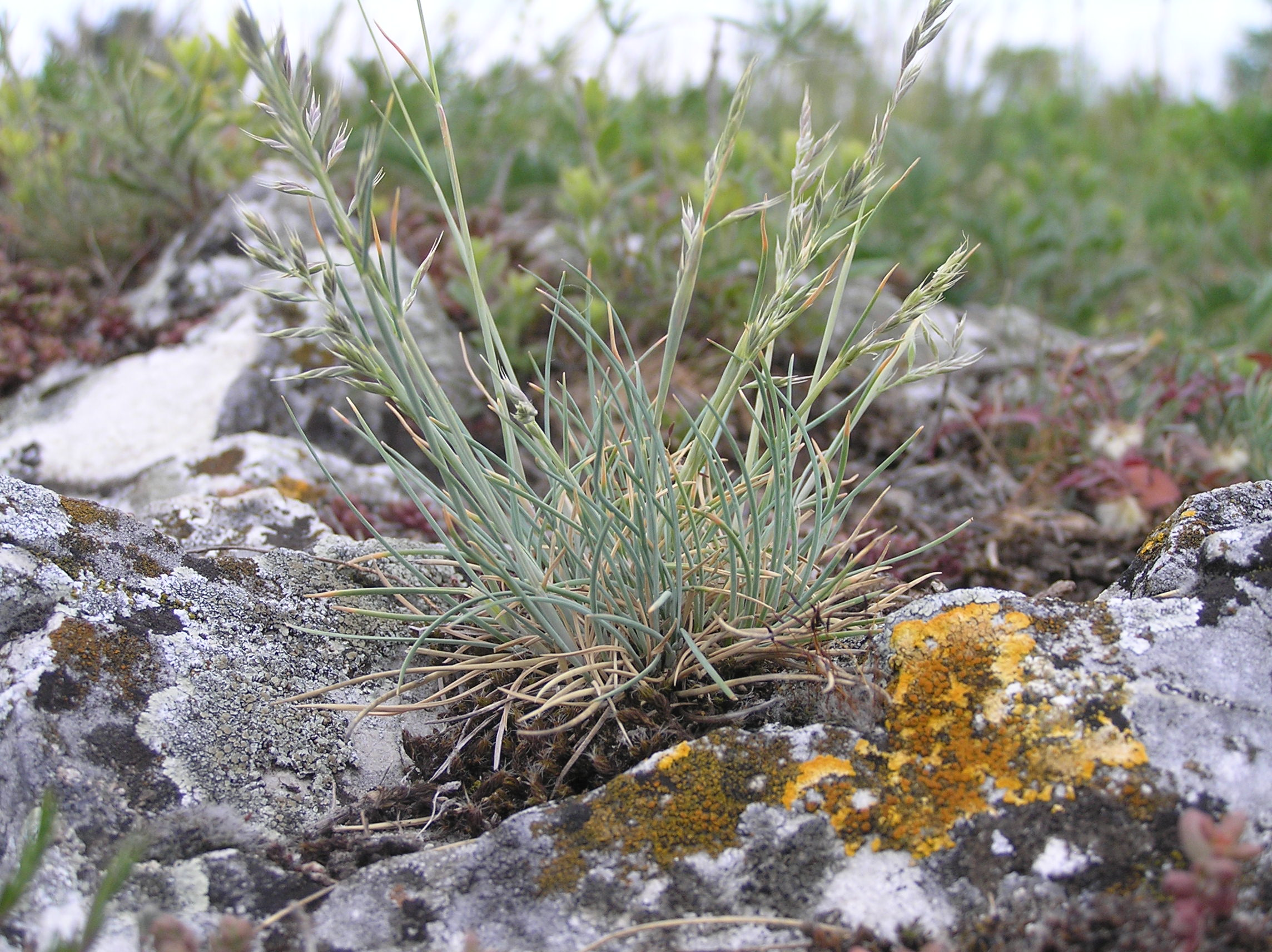

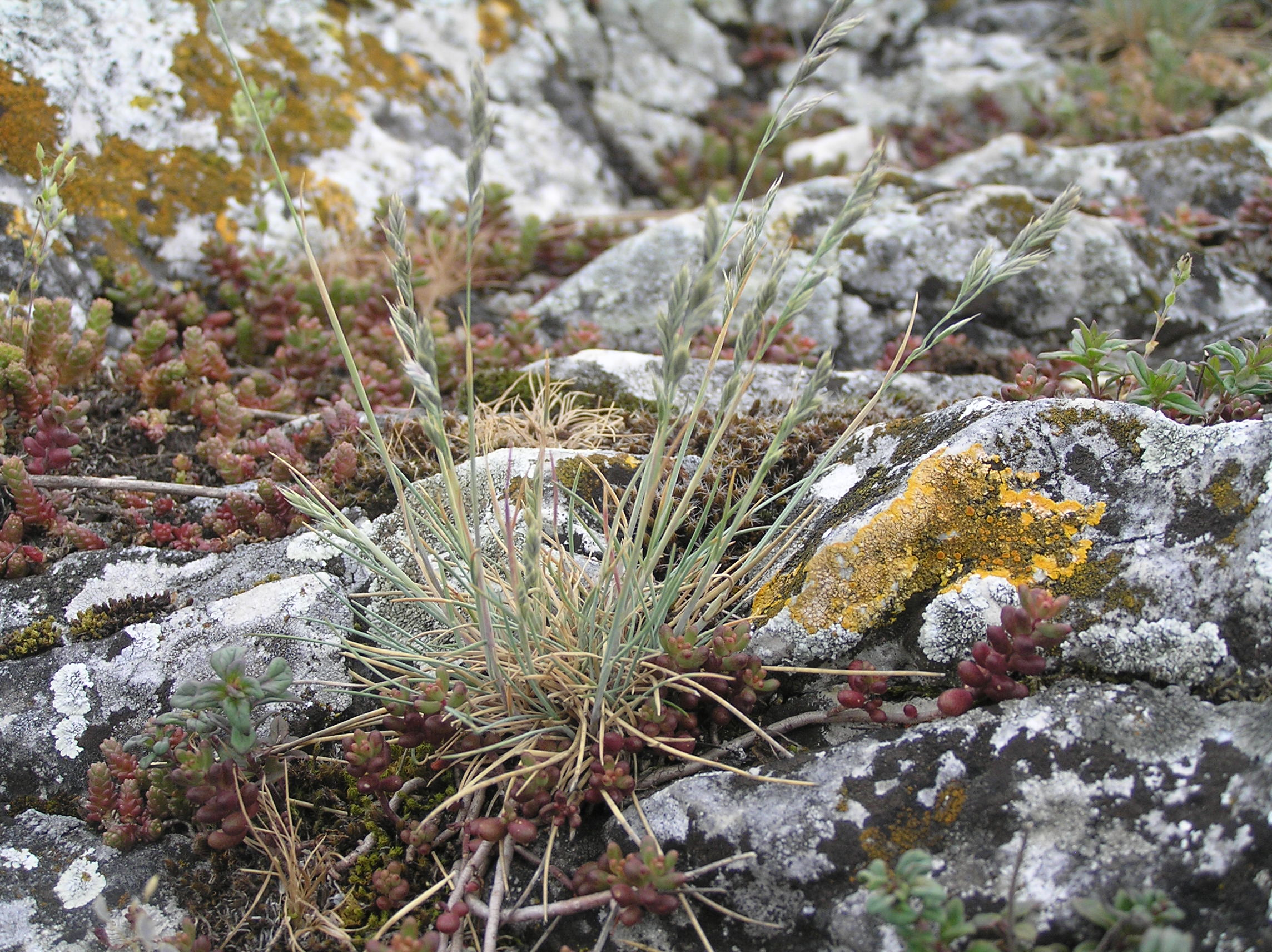

Scientific classification
- Kingdom: Plantae
- Clade: Tracheophytes
- Clade: Angiosperms
- Clade: Monocots
- Clade: Commelinids
- Order: Poales
- Family: Poaceae
- Subfamily: Pooideae
- Genus: Festuca
- Species: F. pallens

Binomial name
- Festuca pallens Host

= Festuca pallens =

Species of grass

Festuca pallens, the blue fescue, is a species of grass.
