= Festuca versuta =

Conservation status
- Vulnerable (NatureServe)

Scientific classification
- Kingdom: Plantae
- Clade: Tracheophytes
- Clade: Angiosperms
- Clade: Monocots
- Clade: Commelinids
- Order: Poales
- Family: Poaceae
- Subfamily: Pooideae
- Genus: Festuca
- Species: F. versuta

Binomial name
- Festuca versuta Beal

Synonyms
- Festuca obtusa subsp. versuta (Beal) St.-Yves; Festuca johnsonii (Vasey) Piper; Festuca nutans var. johnsonii Vasey; Festuca texana Vasey

Species of grass

Festuca versuta, also known as Texas fescue, is a species of grass in the family Poaceae. The species was first published in 1896. This species is native to East Central USA.

== Habitat ==
Festuca versuta is perennial and mainly grows in warm temperate biomes.
