= Festuca frederikseniae =

Conservation status
- Vulnerable (NatureServe)

Scientific classification
- Kingdom: Plantae
- Clade: Embryophytes
- Clade: Tracheophytes
- Clade: Spermatophytes
- Clade: Angiosperms
- Clade: Monocots
- Clade: Commelinids
- Order: Poales
- Family: Poaceae
- Subfamily: Pooideae
- Genus: Festuca
- Species: F. frederikseniae

Binomial name
- Festuca frederikseniae E.B.Alexeev

Synonyms
- Festuca duriuscula var. hirsuta Lange; Festuca ovina var. hirsuta Lange; Festuca vivipara subsp. hirsuta (Schol.) Fred.; Festuca vivipara var. hirsuta Schol.

Species of grass

Festuca frederikseniae, also known as North Atlantic fescue or Frederksen's fescue, is a species of grass native to Greenland, Newfoundland, Labrador, and to a few islands in eastern Québec (Mingan Archipelago and Anticosti Island). In Iceland and southern Greenland, a few populations have been found that may be hybrids between F. rubra and either F. frederikseniae or F. vivipara. The purported hybrids have been named F. x villosa-vivipara. All these species grow on cliffs and on rocky or sandy soils in alpine tundra. It was first described in 1985.

== Characteristics ==
Festuca frederikseniae is a caespitose herb forming tight clumps of plants up to 45 cm (18 inches) tall. Leaf blades are conduplicate (folded lengthwise). Inflorescence is up to 10 cm (4 inches) long with densely hairy spikelet bracts and fascicles.
