= Festuca spectabilis =

Scientific classification
- Kingdom: Plantae
- Clade: Tracheophytes
- Clade: Angiosperms
- Clade: Monocots
- Clade: Commelinids
- Order: Poales
- Family: Poaceae
- Subfamily: Pooideae
- Genus: Festuca
- Species: F. spectabilis

Binomial name
- Festuca spectabilis Bertol.

Species of grass

Festuca spectabilis is a species of grass in the family Poaceae. It is native to South Alps, North Appennini, and Balkan Peninsula. It is perennial and grows in temperate biomes. It was first described in 1834.
