= Festuca lucida =

Scientific classification
- Kingdom: Plantae
- Clade: Tracheophytes
- Clade: Angiosperms
- Clade: Monocots
- Clade: Commelinids
- Order: Poales
- Family: Poaceae
- Subfamily: Pooideae
- Genus: Festuca
- Species: F. lucida

Binomial name
- Festuca lucida Stapf

Species of grass

Festuca lucida is a species of grass in the family Poaceae. It is native in West Himalaya. It is a perennial and mainly grows in temperate biomes. This species was first described in 1896.
