= Festuca earlei =

Scientific classification
- Kingdom: Plantae
- Clade: Tracheophytes
- Clade: Angiosperms
- Clade: Monocots
- Clade: Commelinids
- Order: Poales
- Family: Poaceae
- Subfamily: Pooideae
- Genus: Festuca
- Species: F. earlei

Binomial name
- Festuca earlei Rydb.

Synonyms
- Festuca brachyphylla var. utahensis (St.-Yves) Litard. in Candollea 10: 108 (1945); Festuca brevifolia var. utahensis St.-Yves in Candollea 2: 257 (1925)

Species of grass

Festuca earlei, also known as Earle's fescue, is a species of grass in the family Poaceae. This species is native to Arizona, Colorado, New Mexico, and Utah. Is perennial and prefers temperate biomes. This species was first described in 1905.
