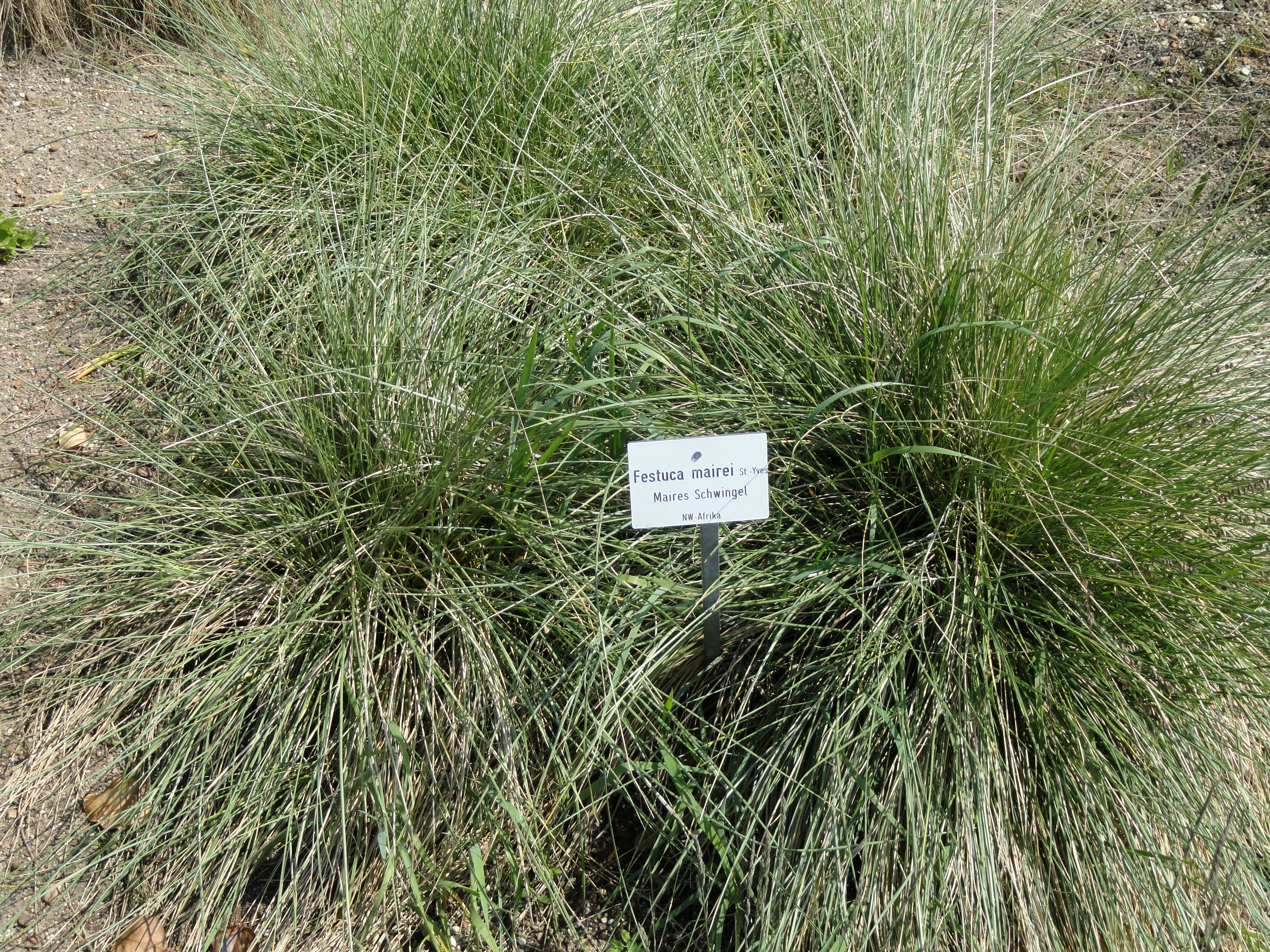

Scientific classification
- Kingdom: Plantae
- Clade: Tracheophytes
- Clade: Angiosperms
- Clade: Monocots
- Clade: Commelinids
- Order: Poales
- Family: Poaceae
- Subfamily: Pooideae
- Genus: Festuca
- Species: F. mairei

Binomial name
- Festuca mairei St.-Yves

= Festuca mairei =

Densely-clumped species of grass

Festuca mairei, the Atlas fescue, is a species of grass in the family Poaceae. The bunchgrass is endemic to north Africa.

== Characteristics ==
Festuca mairei is densely-clumped, evergreen and forms mounds that grow tall up to 24 to 36 inches. It has culms 50–100 cm long. It is cultivated as an ornamental grass known for its tidy foliage. It normally grows up to 60 to 90 centimetres wide. It has a khaki green hue in appearance.
