= Festuca panciciana =

Scientific classification
- Kingdom: Plantae
- Clade: Tracheophytes
- Clade: Angiosperms
- Clade: Monocots
- Clade: Commelinids
- Order: Poales
- Family: Poaceae
- Subfamily: Pooideae
- Genus: Festuca
- Species: F. panciciana

Binomial name
- Festuca panciciana (Hack.) K.Richt. (1890)

Synonyms
- Festuca dalmatica subsp. panciciana (Hack.) Beldie (1972); Festuca ovina var. panciciana Hack. (1882)

Species of grass

Festuca panciciana is a species of grass in the family Poaceae. It is native to the Balkans. It is perennial and grows in temperate biomes. It was first described in 1890.
