= Festuca procera =

Scientific classification
- Kingdom: Plantae
- Clade: Tracheophytes
- Clade: Angiosperms
- Clade: Monocots
- Clade: Commelinids
- Order: Poales
- Family: Poaceae
- Subfamily: Pooideae
- Genus: Festuca
- Species: F. procera

Binomial name
- Festuca procera Kunth

Synonyms
- Diplachne procera (Kunth) Spreng.; Festuca leioclada Hack.; Festuca orgyalis Willd.; Festuca peruviana E.B.Alexeev; Festuca scabra Willd.; Festuca scabriflora Steud.; Festuca sublimis Pilg.

Species of grass

Festuca procera is a species of grass in the family Poaceae. It is native to Colombia and Peru. It is perennial and prefers to grow in montane tropical biomes. It was first described in 1816.
