= Festuca komarovii =

Scientific classification
- Kingdom: Plantae
- Clade: Tracheophytes
- Clade: Angiosperms
- Clade: Monocots
- Clade: Commelinids
- Order: Poales
- Family: Poaceae
- Subfamily: Pooideae
- Genus: Festuca
- Species: F. komarovii

Binomial name
- Festuca komarovii Krivot.

Synonyms
- Festuca sibirica var. planifolia Roshev. in Fl. Zabaical. 1: 87 (1929)

Species of grass

Festuca komarovii is a species of grass in the family Poaceae. It is native to Buryatiya, Irkutsk, and Mongolia. It is perennial and mainly grows in temperate biomes. It was first published in 1955.
