= Festuca glacialis =

Scientific classification
- Kingdom: Plantae
- Clade: Tracheophytes
- Clade: Angiosperms
- Clade: Monocots
- Clade: Commelinids
- Order: Poales
- Family: Poaceae
- Subfamily: Pooideae
- Genus: Festuca
- Species: F. glacialis

Binomial name
- Festuca glacialis (Miégev. ex Hack.) K.Richt.

Synonyms
- Festuca ovina var. glacialis Miégev. ex Hack. in Monogr. Festuc. Eur.: 115 (1882)

Species of grass

Festuca glacialis is a species of grass in the family Poaceae. This species is native to France, and Spain. It is perennial and prefers subalpine or subarctic biomes. Festuca glacialis was first described in 1890.
