= Festuca rivularis =

Scientific classification
- Kingdom: Plantae
- Clade: Tracheophytes
- Clade: Angiosperms
- Clade: Monocots
- Clade: Commelinids
- Order: Poales
- Family: Poaceae
- Subfamily: Pooideae
- Genus: Festuca
- Species: F. rivularis

Binomial name
- Festuca rivularis Boiss. (1838)

Species of grass

Festuca rivularis is a species of grass in the family Poaceae. It is native to the mountains of southwestern Europe and to northeastern Greece. It is perennial and grows in temperate biomes.
