= Festuca robustifolia =

Scientific classification
- Kingdom: Plantae
- Clade: Tracheophytes
- Clade: Angiosperms
- Clade: Monocots
- Clade: Commelinids
- Order: Poales
- Family: Poaceae
- Subfamily: Pooideae
- Genus: Festuca
- Species: F. robustifolia

Binomial name
- Festuca robustifolia Markgr.-Dann. (1978)

Species of grass

Festuca robustifolia is a species of grass in the family Poaceae. It is native to central and southern Italy and Sicily. It is perennial and grows in temperate biomes. It was first described in 1978.
