= Festuca rigescens =

Scientific classification
- Kingdom: Plantae
- Clade: Tracheophytes
- Clade: Angiosperms
- Clade: Monocots
- Clade: Commelinids
- Order: Poales
- Family: Poaceae
- Subfamily: Pooideae
- Genus: Festuca
- Species: F. rigescens

Binomial name
- Festuca rigescens (J.Presl) Kunth (1833)

Species of grass

Festuca rigescens is a species of grass in the family Poaceae. It is native to Peru, Bolivia, northwestern Argentina, and northern and central Chile. It is perennial and grows in subalpine or subarctic biomes. It was first described in 1833.
