= Festuca venusta =

Scientific classification
- Kingdom: Plantae
- Clade: Tracheophytes
- Clade: Angiosperms
- Clade: Monocots
- Clade: Commelinids
- Order: Poales
- Family: Poaceae
- Subfamily: Pooideae
- Genus: Festuca
- Species: F. venusta

Binomial name
- Festuca venusta St.-Yves

Species of grass

Festuca venusta is a species of grass in the family Poaceae. The species was first published in 1929. This species is native to South Siberia, and Mongolia.

== Habitat ==
Festuca venusta is perennial and mainly grows in temperate biomes.
