= Festuca minutiflora =

Scientific classification
- Kingdom: Plantae
- Clade: Tracheophytes
- Clade: Angiosperms
- Clade: Monocots
- Clade: Commelinids
- Order: Poales
- Family: Poaceae
- Subfamily: Pooideae
- Genus: Festuca
- Species: F. minutiflora

Binomial name
- Festuca minutiflora Rydb.

Synonyms
- Festuca brachyphylla var. endotera (St.-Yves) Litard.; Festuca brevifolia var. endotera St.-Yves; Festuca ovina var. minutiflora (Rydb.) Howell

Species of grass

Festuca minutiflora, the smallflower fescue, is a species of grass in the family Poaceae. It is native to Alaska, Alberta, Arizona, British Columbia, California, Colorado, Idaho, Montana, Nevada, New Mexico, Oregon, Utah, Wyoming, and the Yukon. Festuca minutiflora was first published in 1905 by Per Axel Rydberg.

== Habitat ==
It is perennial and mainly grows in temperate biomes.
