= Festuca subulifolia =

Scientific classification
- Kingdom: Plantae
- Clade: Tracheophytes
- Clade: Angiosperms
- Clade: Monocots
- Clade: Commelinids
- Order: Poales
- Family: Poaceae
- Subfamily: Pooideae
- Genus: Festuca
- Species: F. subulifolia

Binomial name
- Festuca subulifolia Benth.

Species of grass

Festuca subulifolia is a species of grass in the family Poaceae. It is native in West South America. It is a perennial and mainly grows in montane tropical biomes. It was described and published by George Bentham in 1846.
