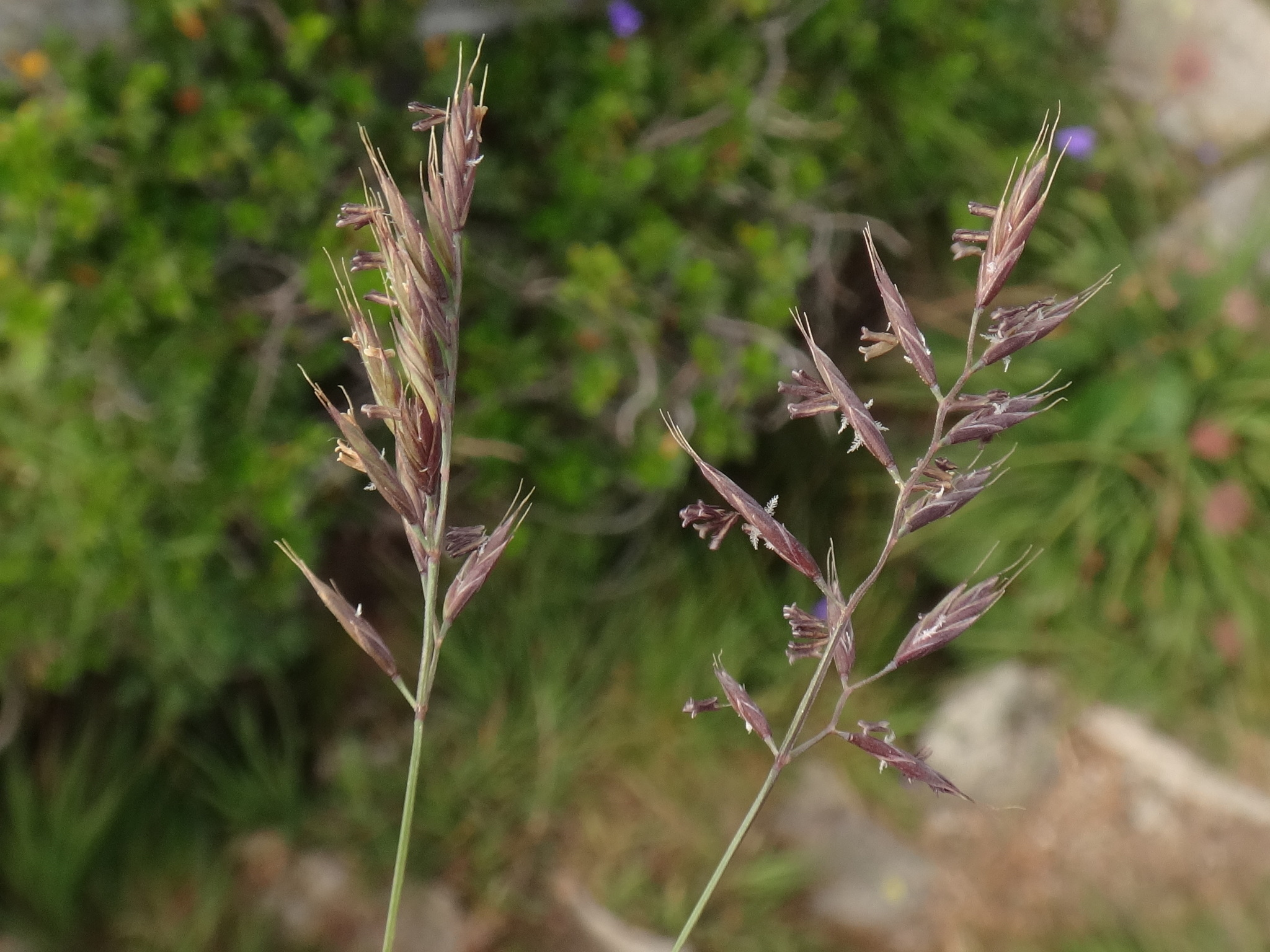

Scientific classification
- Kingdom: Plantae
- Clade: Tracheophytes
- Clade: Angiosperms
- Clade: Monocots
- Clade: Commelinids
- Order: Poales
- Family: Poaceae
- Subfamily: Pooideae
- Genus: Festuca
- Species: F. pseudodura

Binomial name
- Festuca pseudodura Steud. (1854)

Synonyms
- List: Festuca dura Host (1802); Festuca dura var. pubifolia J.Vetter (1915); Festuca halleri var. dura (Hegi) P.Fourn. (1934); Festuca halleri subsp. dura (Hegi) P.Fourn. (1934); Festuca tauricola J.Vetter Hegi (1906); Festuca tauricola var. pilosa J.Vetter (1927); Festuca tauricola var. pilosa J.Vetter (1927)

= Festuca pseudodura =

Species of grass

Festuca pseudodura is a species of grass in the family Poaceae. It is native to the eastern Alps. It is a perennial plant and prefers to grow in temperate biomes.
