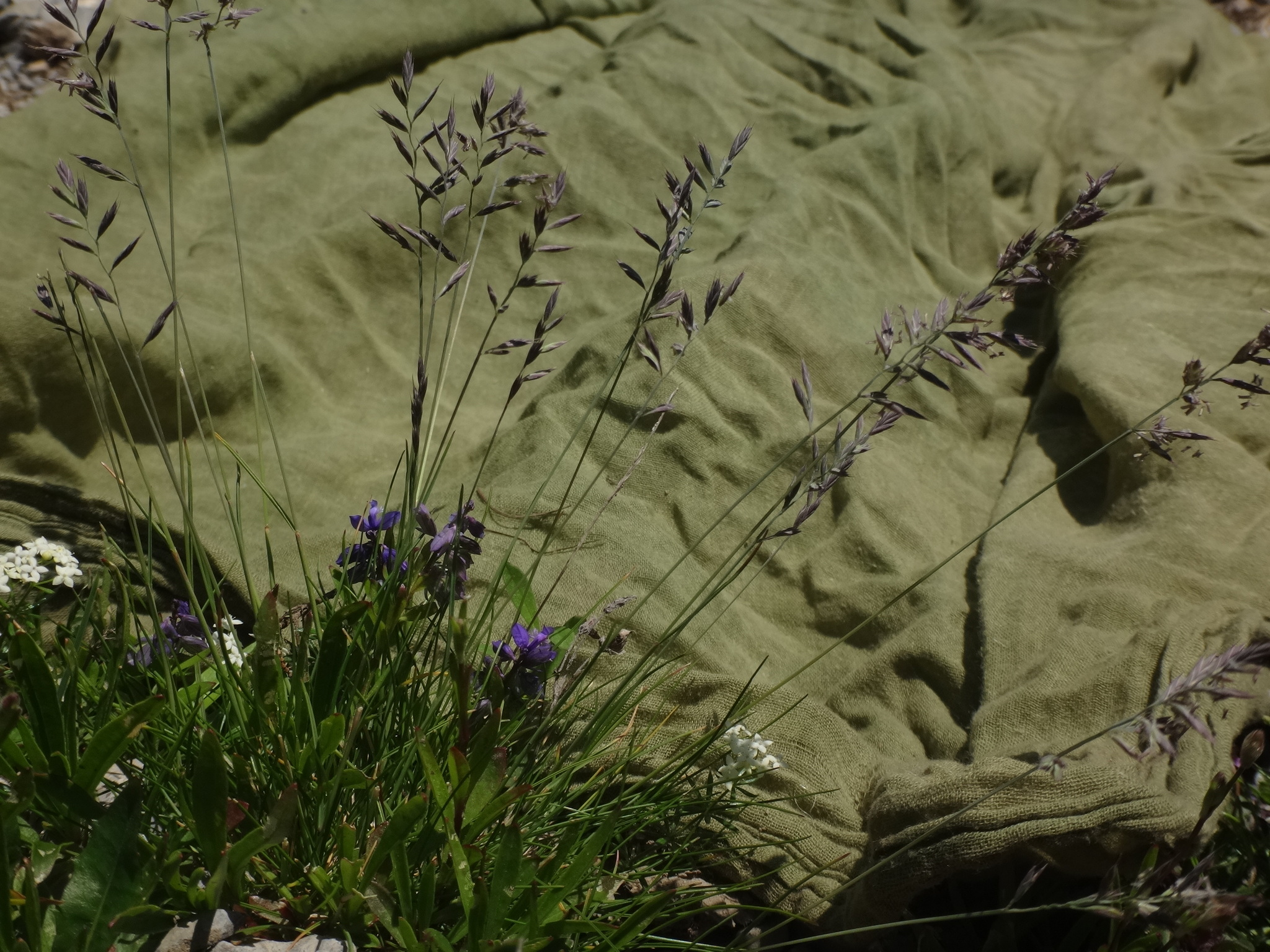

Scientific classification
- Kingdom: Plantae
- Clade: Tracheophytes
- Clade: Angiosperms
- Clade: Monocots
- Clade: Commelinids
- Order: Poales
- Family: Poaceae
- Subfamily: Pooideae
- Genus: Festuca
- Species: F. rupicaprina

Binomial name
- Festuca rupicaprina (Hack.) A.Kern. (1884)

Synonyms
- Festuca halleri subsp. rupicaprina (Hack.) Nyman (1882); Festuca ovina var. rupicaprina Hack. (1882)

= Festuca rupicaprina =

Species of grass

Festuca rupicaprina is a species of grass in the family Poaceae. It is native to the Alps. It is perennial and grows in temperate biomes.
