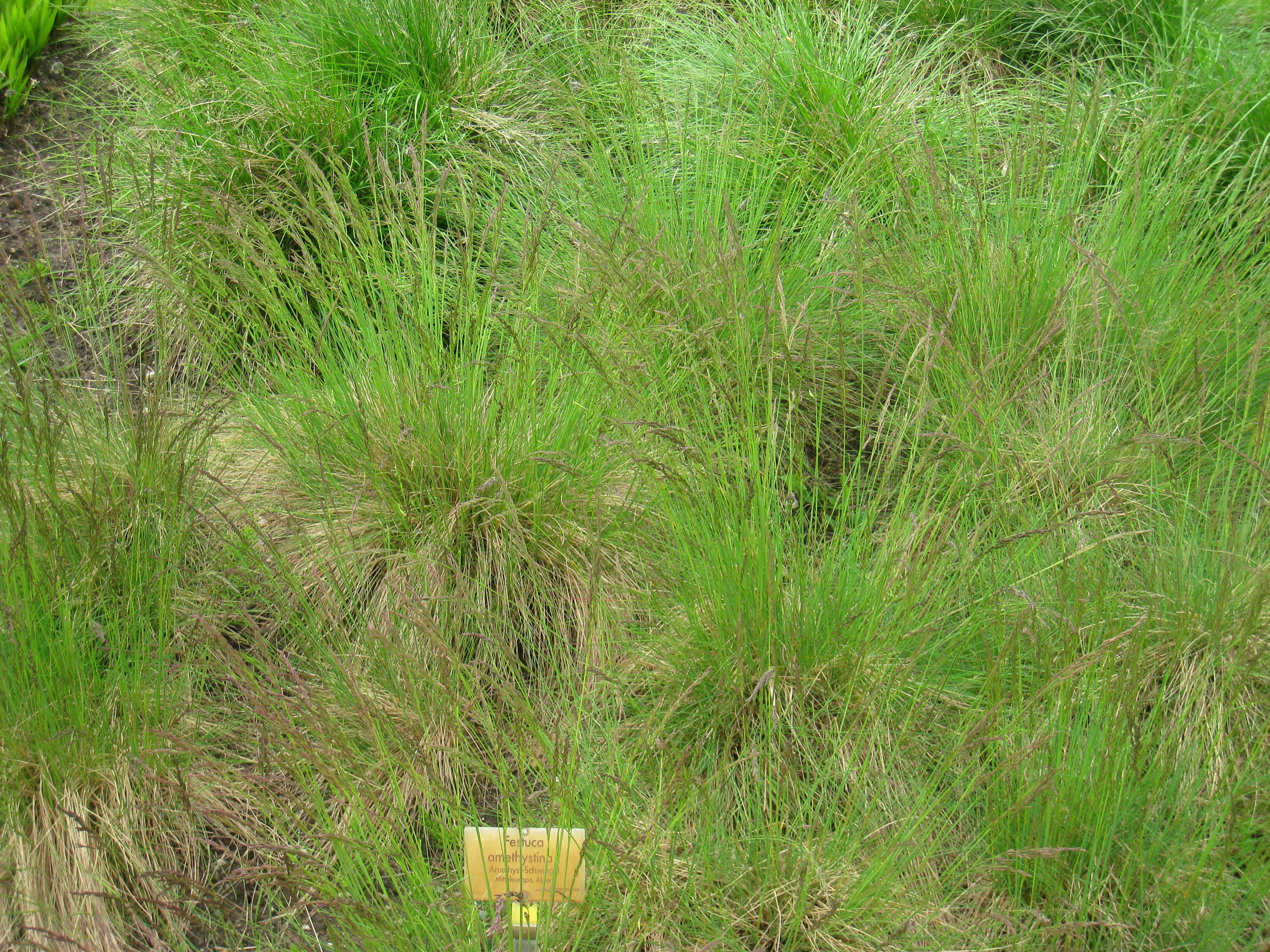

Scientific classification
- Kingdom: Plantae
- Clade: Tracheophytes
- Clade: Angiosperms
- Clade: Monocots
- Clade: Commelinids
- Order: Poales
- Family: Poaceae
- Subfamily: Pooideae
- Genus: Festuca
- Species: F. amethystina

Binomial name
- Festuca amethystina L.

= Festuca amethystina =

Species of grass

Festuca amethystina, also known as the tufted fescue, is a species of grass in the family Poaceae. It is native to Europe, including Turkey. It is perennial and grows in temperate biomes. It was first described in 1753 by Carl Linnaeus.
