= Festuca nigrescens =

Scientific classification
- Kingdom: Plantae
- Clade: Tracheophytes
- Clade: Angiosperms
- Clade: Monocots
- Clade: Commelinids
- Order: Poales
- Family: Poaceae
- Subfamily: Pooideae
- Genus: Festuca
- Species: F. nigrescens

Binomial name
- Festuca nigrescens Lam.

Synonyms
- Festuca fallax var. nigrescens (Lam.); Festuca heterophylla var. nigrescens (Lam.); Festuca rubra proles nigrescens (Lam.); Festuca rubra var. nigrescens (Lam.); Festuca rubra f. nigrescens (Lam.); Schedonorus nigrescens (Lam.)

Species of grass

Festuca nigrescens, also known as the alpine Chewing's fescue, is a species of grass in the family Poaceae. It was first described in 1788. It is perennial and grows in temperate biomes.

== Description ==
=== Leaves ===
Festuca nigrescens is perennial, caespitose, and densely clumped. Butt sheaths are persistent, investing on the base of the culm, along with fibrous dead sheaths. The culms grow from 30 - 90 centimeters long. The leaf sheaths are tubular, with flat margins glabrous on their surface. Ligules are an eciliate membrane. The leaf blades are filiform, conduplicate, and are 0.4 to 0.7 millimeters wide. Leaf blades are either dark green or glaucous. The venation of the leaf blades have 5 - 7 vascular bundles, along with strands of sclerenchyma below the veins (some are above the veins). The leaves are smooth, or scabrous, and rough adaxially.

=== Inflorescence ===
The inflorescence is in open panicles, which are 4-10 centimeters long. The panicle branches are scabrous. The spikelets are solitary, whereas the fertile spikelets are pedicelled.
