= Festuca cumminsii =

Scientific classification
- Kingdom: Plantae
- Clade: Tracheophytes
- Clade: Angiosperms
- Clade: Monocots
- Clade: Commelinids
- Order: Poales
- Family: Poaceae
- Subfamily: Pooideae
- Genus: Festuca
- Species: F. cumminsii

Binomial name
- Festuca cumminsii Stapf

Species of grass

Festuca cumminsii is a species of grass in the family Poaceae. This species is native to China North-Central, China South-Central, East Himalaya, Inner Mongolia, Kazakhstan, Kirgizstan, Mongolia, Nepal, Qinghai, Tadzhikistan, Tibet, West Himalaya, and Xinjiang. Festuca cumminsii prefers temperate biomes and is perennial. This species was first described in 1896.
