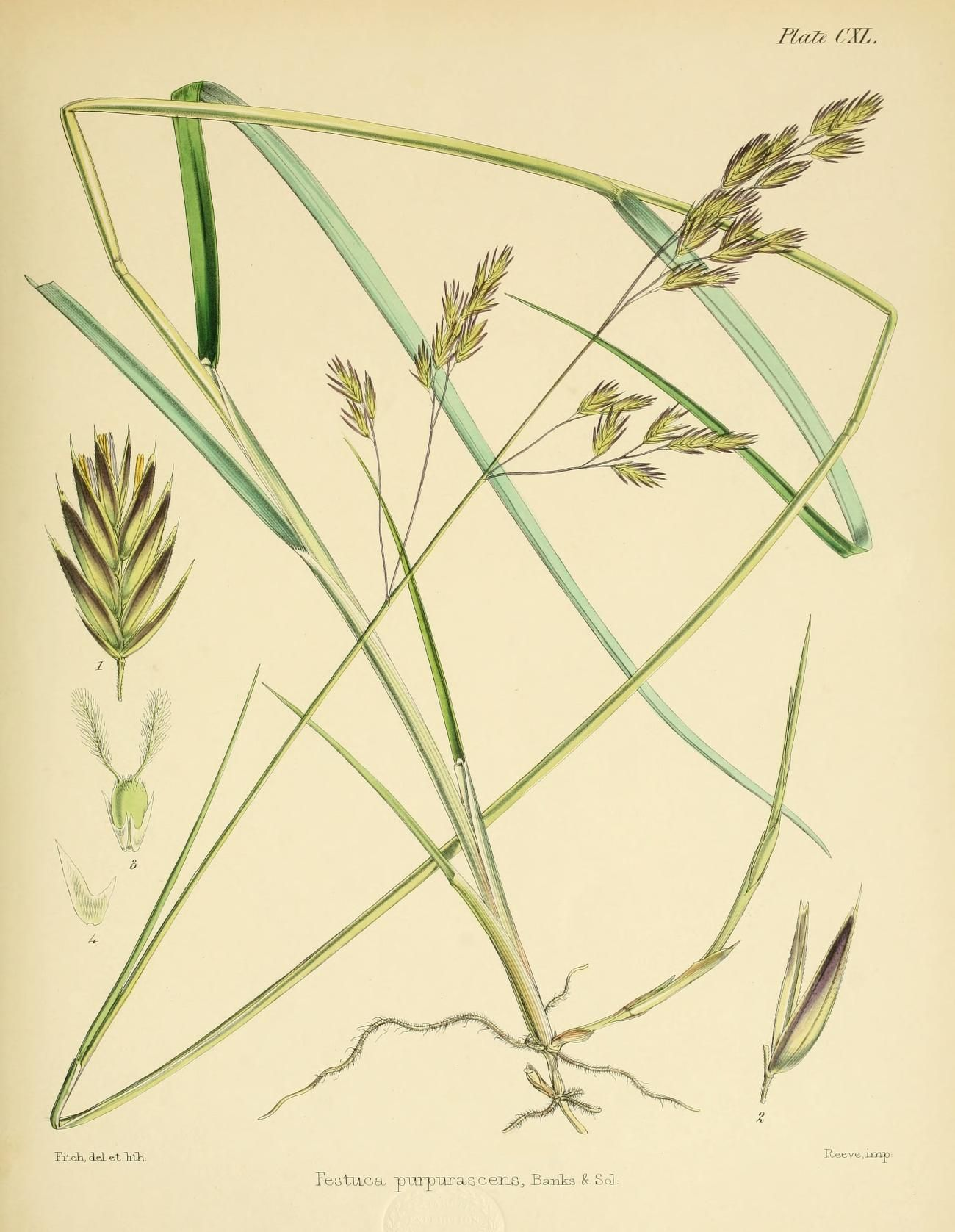

Scientific classification
- Kingdom: Plantae
- Clade: Tracheophytes
- Clade: Angiosperms
- Clade: Monocots
- Clade: Commelinids
- Order: Poales
- Family: Poaceae
- Subfamily: Pooideae
- Genus: Festuca
- Species: F. purpurascens

Binomial name
- Festuca purpurascens Banks & Sol. ex Hook.f. (1847)

Synonyms
- Festuca purpurascens var. submutica É.Desv.; Festuca davilae Phil.; Festuca dumetorum Phil.; Festuca glaucophylla Phil.; Festuca insularis Steud.; Festuca laxiflora Phil.; Festuca lechleriana Steud.; Festuca philippii Bech.; Festuca platyphylla Steud.; Festuca purpurascens f. aristata St.-Yves; Festuca purpurascens var. aristata É.Desv.; Festuca purpurascens var. platyphylla (Steud.) St.-Yves; Festuca purpurascens f. scabriuscula St.-Yves; Festuca serranoi Phil.; Festuca trachylepis Hack. ex Druce

= Festuca purpurascens =

Species of grass

Festuca purpurascens is a species of grass in the family Poaceae. It is native to Chile and Argentina. It is either perennial or a rhizomatous geophyte. It prefers to grow in temperate biomes. It was first described in 1847.
