= Festuca scariosa =

Scientific classification
- Kingdom: Plantae
- Clade: Tracheophytes
- Clade: Angiosperms
- Clade: Monocots
- Clade: Commelinids
- Order: Poales
- Family: Poaceae
- Subfamily: Pooideae
- Genus: Festuca
- Species: F. scariosa

Binomial name
- Festuca scariosa (Lag.) Pau (1922)

Species of grass

Festuca scariosa is a species of grass in the family Poaceae. It is native to southeastern and southern Spain and northern Morocco. It is perennial and grows in temperate biomes. It was first described in 1922.
