= Festuca glumosa =

Conservation status
- Near Threatened (IUCN 3.1)

Scientific classification
- Kingdom: Plantae
- Clade: Tracheophytes
- Clade: Angiosperms
- Clade: Monocots
- Clade: Commelinids
- Order: Poales
- Family: Poaceae
- Subfamily: Pooideae
- Genus: Festuca
- Species: F. glumosa

Binomial name
- Festuca glumosa Hack. ex E.B.Alexeev

Species of grass

Festuca glumosa is a species of grass in the family Poaceae. It is found in Ecuador and Colombia. It is a perennial that primarily grows in montane tropical biomes.
