= Festuca parciflora =

Conservation status
- Vulnerable (IUCN 3.1)

Scientific classification
- Kingdom: Plantae
- Clade: Tracheophytes
- Clade: Angiosperms
- Clade: Monocots
- Clade: Commelinids
- Order: Poales
- Family: Poaceae
- Subfamily: Pooideae
- Genus: Festuca
- Species: F. parciflora

Binomial name
- Festuca parciflora Swallen

Species of grass

Festuca parciflora is a species of grass in the family Poaceae. It is found only in Ecuador.
