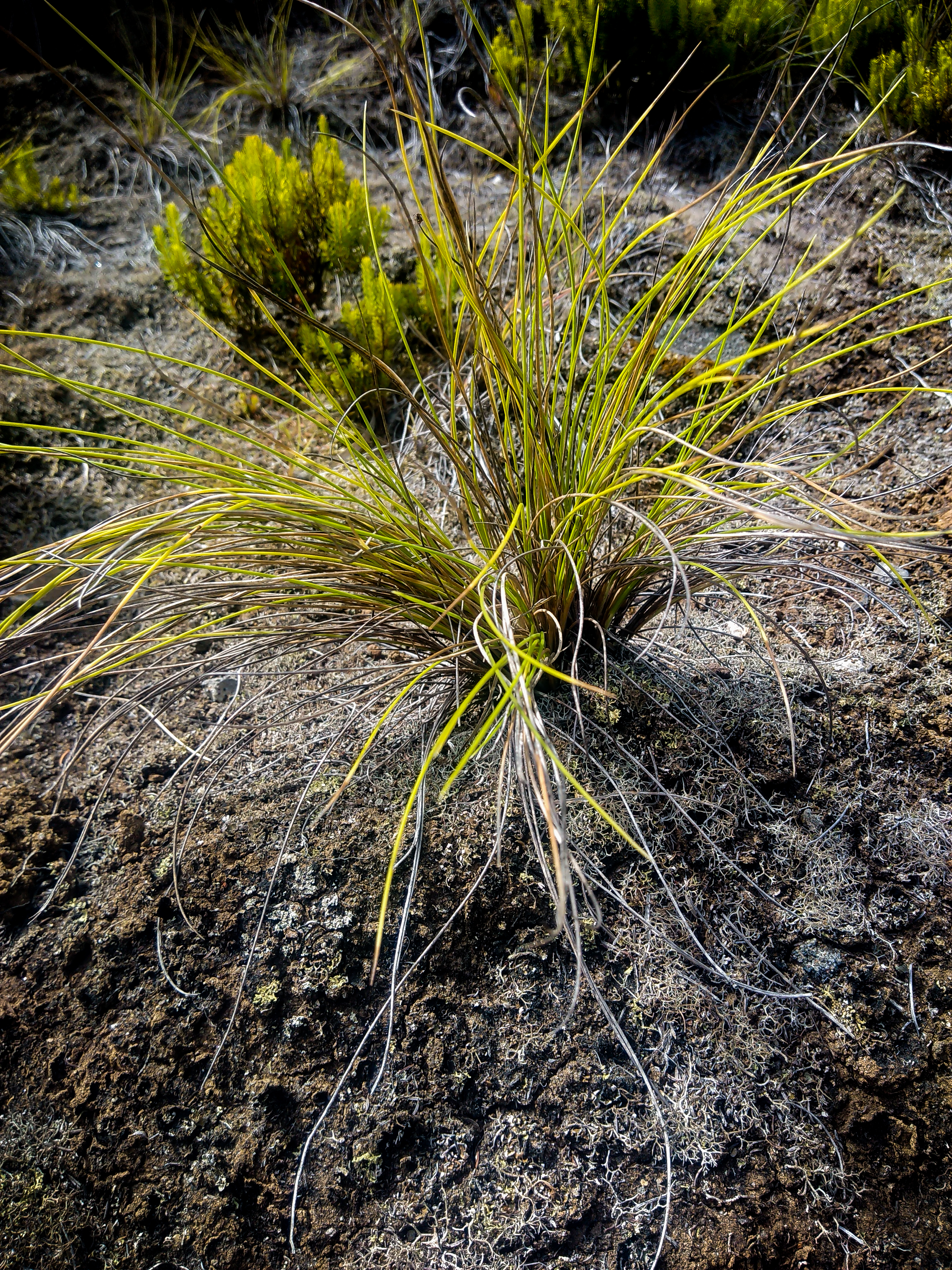

Scientific classification
- Kingdom: Plantae
- Clade: Tracheophytes
- Clade: Angiosperms
- Clade: Monocots
- Clade: Commelinids
- Order: Poales
- Family: Poaceae
- Subfamily: Pooideae
- Genus: Festuca
- Species: F. jubata

Binomial name
- Festuca jubata Lowe

Synonyms
- Festuca glauca var. longearistata Hochst. ex Seub. in Fl. Azor.: 20 (1840)

= Festuca jubata =

Species of grass

Festuca jubata is a species of grass in the family Poaceae. It is native to Azores and Madeira. It is a perennial and mainly grows in temperate biomes. It was first published in 1838.
