= Festuca sibirica =

Scientific classification
- Kingdom: Plantae
- Clade: Tracheophytes
- Clade: Angiosperms
- Clade: Monocots
- Clade: Commelinids
- Order: Poales
- Family: Poaceae
- Subfamily: Pooideae
- Genus: Festuca
- Species: F. sibirica

Binomial name
- Festuca sibirica Hack. ex Boiss. (1884)

Species of grass

Festuca sibirica is a species of grass in the family Poaceae. It is native to Siberia, North China, Afghanistan, and Nepal. It is perennial and grows in temperate biomes.
