= Festuca litvinovii =

Scientific classification
- Kingdom: Plantae
- Clade: Tracheophytes
- Clade: Angiosperms
- Clade: Monocots
- Clade: Commelinids
- Order: Poales
- Family: Poaceae
- Subfamily: Pooideae
- Genus: Festuca
- Species: F. litvinovii

Binomial name
- Festuca litvinovii Tzvelev

Synonyms
- Festuca pseudosulcata subsp. litvinovii (Tzvelev) Tzvelev in Bot. Zhurn. (Moscow & Leningrad) 56: 1255 (1971); Festuca pseudosulcata var. litvinovii Tzvelev in Rast. Tsentral. Azii 4: 170 (1968)

Species of grass

Festuca litvinovii is a species of grass in the family Poaceae. It is native to Amur, China North-Central, Chita, Inner Mongolia, Khabarovsk, Manchuria, Mongolia, Qinghai, and Xinjiang. It is perennial and mainly grows on temperate biomes. Festuca litvinovii was first published in 1976.
