= Festuca cretacea =

Scientific classification
- Kingdom: Plantae
- Clade: Tracheophytes
- Clade: Angiosperms
- Clade: Monocots
- Clade: Commelinids
- Order: Poales
- Family: Poaceae
- Subfamily: Pooideae
- Genus: Festuca
- Species: F. cretacea

Binomial name
- Festuca cretacea T.I.Popov ex Proskor.

Synonyms
- Festuca cretacea (Lavrenko) Czern. ex V.I.Krecz. & Bobrov; Festuca cretacea var. popovii Tzvelev; Festuca issatchenkoi St.-Yves; Festuca rubra subsp. cretacea Lavrenko; Festuca spryginii (Tzvelev) Tzvelev

Species of grass

Festuca cretacea is a species of grass in the family Poaceae. This species is native to Central European Russia, South European Russia, and Ukraine. Festuca cretacea prefers temperate biomes and is perennial. This species was first described in 1927.
