= Festuca dimorpha =

Scientific classification
- Kingdom: Plantae
- Clade: Tracheophytes
- Clade: Angiosperms
- Clade: Monocots
- Clade: Commelinids
- Order: Poales
- Family: Poaceae
- Subfamily: Pooideae
- Genus: Festuca
- Species: F. dimorpha

Binomial name
- Festuca dimorpha Guss. (1826)

Synonyms
- Festuca laxa subsp. dimorpha (Guss.) St.-Yves in Bull. Soc. Bot. France 71: 132 (1924); Leucopoa dimorpha (Guss.) H.Scholz & Foggi in Willdenowia 35: 243 (2005); Festuca dimorpha var. majellensis Gand. in Nov. Consp. Fl. Eur.: 504 (1910)

Species of grass

Festuca dimorpha is a species of plant in the family Poaceae. This species is native to the southwestern Alps and central and southern Apennine Mountains of France and Italy. Festuca dimorpha was first described in 1826.

== Habitat ==
It is perennial and grows in temperate biomes.
