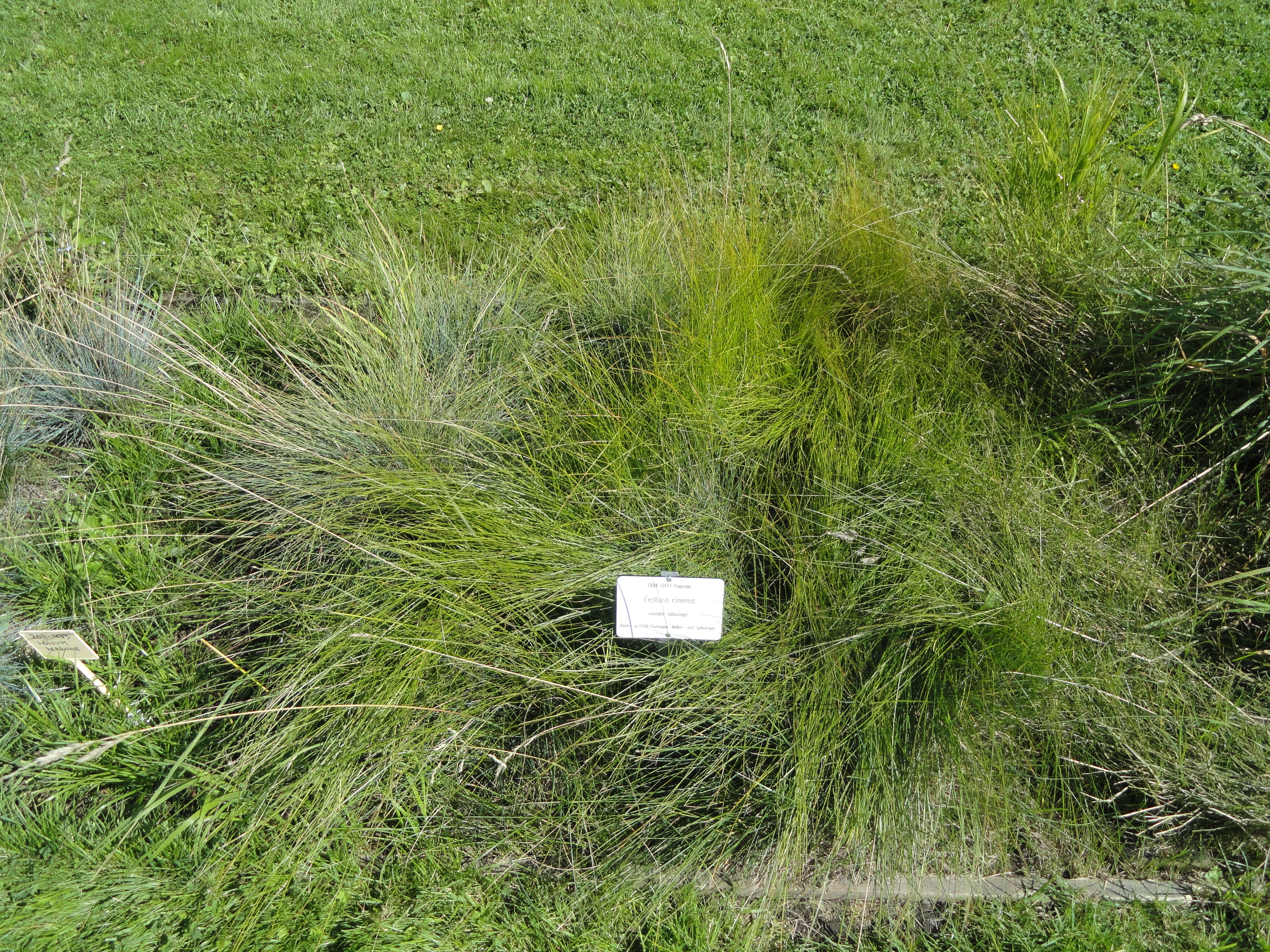

Scientific classification
- Kingdom: Plantae
- Clade: Tracheophytes
- Clade: Angiosperms
- Clade: Monocots
- Clade: Commelinids
- Order: Poales
- Family: Poaceae
- Subfamily: Pooideae
- Genus: Festuca
- Species: F. cinerea

Binomial name
- Festuca cinerea Vill.

= Festuca cinerea =

Species of plant

Festuca cinerea, the blue fescue, is a species of perennial grass in the family Poaceae (true grasses). They have a self-supporting growth form and simple, broad leaves. Individuals can grow to 29 cm tall.

== Sources ==
This article incorporates text from a free content work. Licensed under CC0 (license statement/permission). Text taken from Festuca cinerea. Encyclopedia of Life.
