= Festuca hystrix =

Scientific classification
- Kingdom: Plantae
- Clade: Tracheophytes
- Clade: Angiosperms
- Clade: Monocots
- Clade: Commelinids
- Order: Poales
- Family: Poaceae
- Subfamily: Pooideae
- Genus: Festuca
- Species: F. hystrix

Binomial name
- Festuca hystrix Boiss.

Synonyms
- Festuca curvifolia Lag.; Festuca curvifolia Lag. ex Lange; Festuca duriuscula var. hystrix (Boiss.) Boiss.; Festuca hystrix f. longifolia Maire; Festuca indigesta subsp. curvifolia (Lag. ex Lange) Rivas Mart., Fuente & Ortúñez; Festuca indigesta var. hystrix (Boiss.) Willk. ex Willk. & Lange

Species of grass

Festuca hystrix is a species of grass in the family Poaceae.
