= Festuca laxa =

Scientific classification
- Kingdom: Plantae
- Clade: Tracheophytes
- Clade: Angiosperms
- Clade: Monocots
- Clade: Commelinids
- Order: Poales
- Family: Poaceae
- Subfamily: Pooideae
- Genus: Festuca
- Species: F. laxa

Binomial name
- Festuca laxa Host

Synonyms
- Leucopoa laxa (Host) H.Scholz & Foggi in Willdenowia 35: 243 (2005)

Species of grass

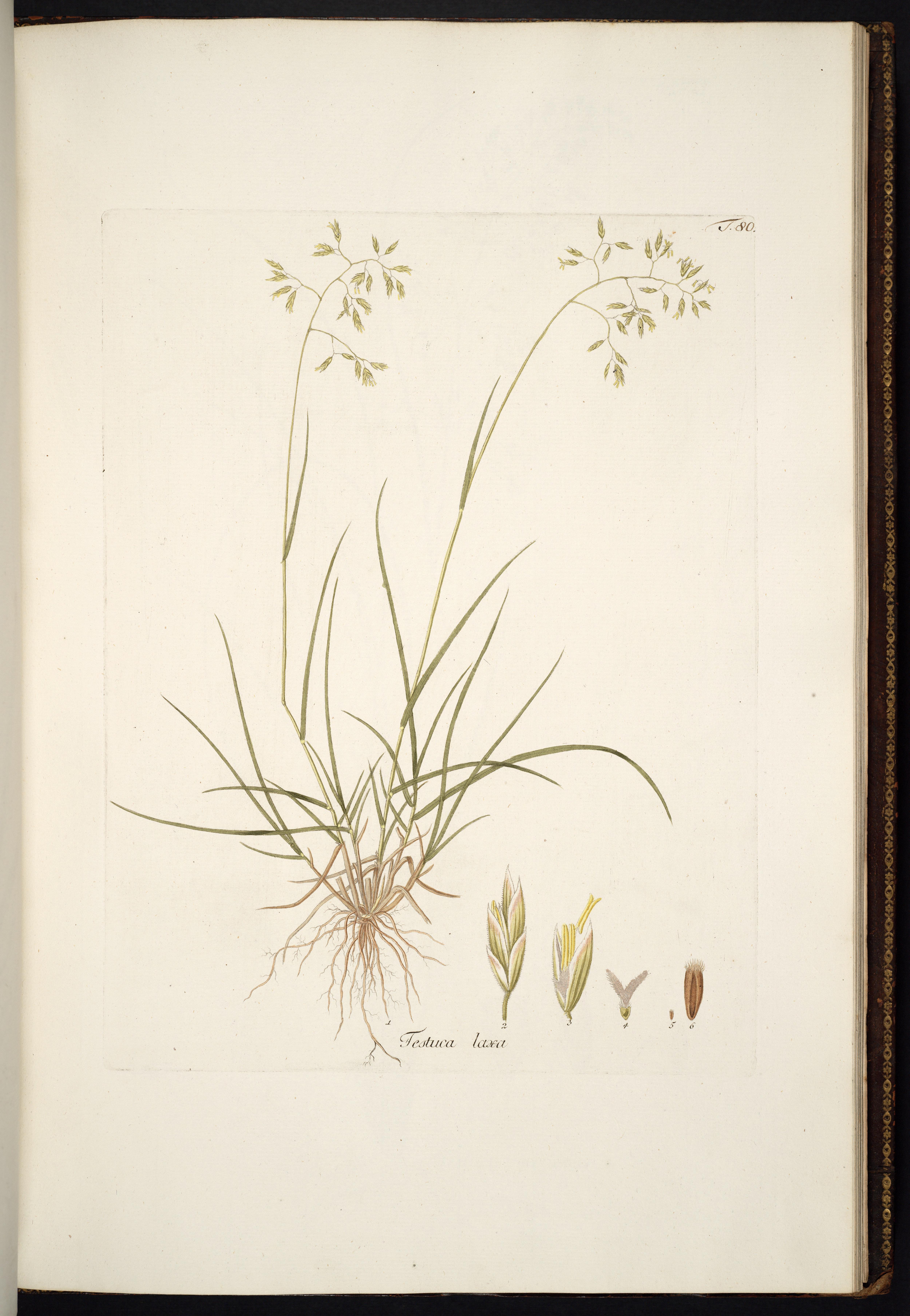

Festuca laxa is a species of grass in the family Poaceae. It is native to Austria and Yugoslavia. It is perennial and mainly grows in temperate biomes. It was first published in 1802.
