= Festuca richardsonii =

Scientific classification
- Kingdom: Plantae
- Clade: Tracheophytes
- Clade: Angiosperms
- Clade: Monocots
- Clade: Commelinids
- Order: Poales
- Family: Poaceae
- Subfamily: Pooideae
- Genus: Festuca
- Species: F. richardsonii

Binomial name
- Festuca richardsonii Hook. (1840)

Synonyms
- Festuca cryophila V.I.Krecz. & Bobrov (1934); Festuca richardsonii var. glabrata Hultén (1942); Festuca richardsonii var. jurtzevii Tzvelev (2010); Festuca rubra subsp. arctica (Hack.) Govor. (1937); Festuca rubra f. arctica Hack. (1882); Festuca rubra subsp. cryophila (V.I.Krecz. & Bobrov) Hultén (1962); Festuca rubra var. mutica Hartm. (1838); Festuca rubra subsp. richardsonii (Hook.) Hultén (1942); Festuca rubra f. vivipara Holmb. (1926), nom. illeg.

Species of grass

Festuca richardsonii is a species of grass in the family Poaceae. It is native northern Eurasia and North America, from Scandinavia to Pakistan and eastern Siberia, and Alaska, Canada, and the northwestern United States. It is perennial and grows in subarctic or subalpine biomes. It was first described in 1840.
