= Festuca calligera =

Scientific classification
- Kingdom: Plantae
- Clade: Tracheophytes
- Clade: Angiosperms
- Clade: Monocots
- Clade: Commelinids
- Order: Poales
- Family: Poaceae
- Subfamily: Pooideae
- Genus: Festuca
- Species: F. calligera

Binomial name
- Festuca calligera (Piper) Rydb.

Species of grass

Festuca calligera, also known as the callused fescue, is a species of grass in the family Poaceae. It was first described in 1909 by Per Axel Rydberg.
