= Festuca pseudodalmatica =

Scientific classification
- Kingdom: Plantae
- Clade: Tracheophytes
- Clade: Angiosperms
- Clade: Monocots
- Clade: Commelinids
- Order: Poales
- Family: Poaceae
- Subfamily: Pooideae
- Genus: Festuca
- Species: F. pseudodalmatica

Binomial name
- Festuca pseudodalmatica Krajina

Species of grass

Festuca pseudodalmatica is a species of grass which can be found in Central, Eastern and southeastern Europe.

== Description ==
The plant is perennial and caespitose with 30–50 centimetres (12–20 in) long culms. The ligule is going around the eciliate membrane. Leaf sheaths are open and smooth with hairy surface while the leaf-blades are conduplicate, elliptic, filiform, and are 15–30 centimetres (5.9–11.8 in) by 0.4–0.7 millimetres (0.016–0.028 in). They are mid-green in colour and are pruinose. The panicle is open, ovate, inflorescenced and 8–15 millimetres (0.31–0.59 in) long with branches being scabrous.

Spikelets are oblong, solitary, 6.5–8 millimetres (0.26–0.31 in) long, and carry fertile ones that are pedicelled. Fertile florets are diminished at the apex and have 4–7 fertile florets. It also have a palea that have a ciliolate keels and hairy surface. The glumes are chartaceous, linear and keelless while the apexes and size are different. The upper glume is 3.4–5 millimetres (0.13–0.20 in) long and have an acuminate apex while the lower glume apex is acute with absent lateral veins.

Fertile lemma is 5–5.6 millimetres (0.20–0.22 in) long and is also chartaceous, lanceolate, and keelless just like the glumes while the colour of it is dark green. Lemma itself have smooth surface, eciliate margins, and acuminate apex. Flowers have three stamens while the fruits are ellipsoid and have caryopses with an additional pericarp. Hilum is linear.
