= Festuca pulchella =

Scientific classification
- Kingdom: Plantae
- Clade: Tracheophytes
- Clade: Angiosperms
- Clade: Monocots
- Clade: Commelinids
- Order: Poales
- Family: Poaceae
- Subfamily: Pooideae
- Genus: Festuca
- Species: F. pulchella

Binomial name
- Festuca pulchella Schrad. (1806)

Species of grass

Festuca pulchella is a species of grass in the family Poaceae. It is native from eastern France (Jura) to the Alps. It is perennial and mainly grows in temperate biomes. It was first described in 1806.
