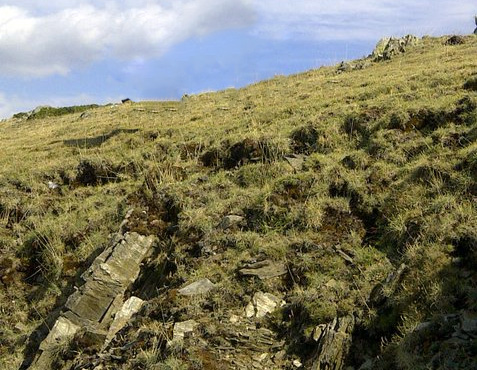

Scientific classification
- Kingdom: Plantae
- Clade: Tracheophytes
- Clade: Angiosperms
- Clade: Monocots
- Clade: Commelinids
- Order: Poales
- Family: Poaceae
- Subfamily: Pooideae
- Genus: Festuca
- Species: F. indigesta

Binomial name
- Festuca indigesta Boiss.

Synonyms
- See text

= Festuca indigesta =

Species of grass

Festuca indigesta is a species of grass in the family Poaceae. It is native to Algeria, Corse, France, Ireland, Italy, Morocco, Portugal, and Spain. It is perennial and mainly grows in temperate biomes. It was first described as a species by Pierre Edmond Boissier, and now is published in 1838 as Festuca indigesta.

== Synonyms ==
List of synonyms:

- Festuca duriuscula var. indigesta (Boiss.) Boiss. in Voy. Bot. Espagne 2: 671 (1844)
- Festuca ovina subsp. indigesta (Boiss.) Hack. in Monogr. Festuc. Eur.: 99 (1882)
- Festuca hackelii (St.-Yves) Fuente & Ortúñez in Biosist. secc. Festuca Penins. Iber.: 81 (1998), nom. illeg.
- Festuca indigesta subsp. alleizettei (Litard.) Kerguélen in Lejeunia, n.s., 75: 158 (1975)
- Festuca indigesta subsp. hackeliana (St.-Yves) Markgr.-Dann. in Bot. J. Linn. Soc. 76: 328 (1978)
- Festuca indigesta subsp. hackelii (St.-Yves) Franco & Rocha Afonso in Bol. Soc. Brot., sér. 2.A, 54: 97 (1980-1981 publ. 1980)
- Festuca indigesta subsp. infesta (Hack. ex Batt. & Trab.) Trab. in J.A.Battandier & L.C.Trabut, Fl. Algérie, Monocot.: 213 (1895)
- Festuca indigesta subsp. lagascae Cebolla & Rivas Ponce in Fl. Medit. 9: 141 (1999)
- Festuca indigesta subsp. molinieri (Litard.) Kerguélen in Lejeunia, n.s., 75: 159 (1975)
- Festuca infesta Hack. ex Batt. & Trab. in Bull. Soc. Bot. France 35: 347 (1888), nom. nud.
- Festuca ovina var. alleizettei Litard. in Candollea 10: 125 (1945)
- Festuca ovina var. hackeliana St.-Yves in Candollea 1: 62 (1922)
- Festuca ovina subsp. hackelii St.-Yves in Bull. Soc. Bot. France 56: 356 (1909)
- Festuca ovina subsp. molinieri (Litard.) O.Bolòs & Vigo in Fl. Països Catalans 4: 351 (2001)
- Festuca ovina var. molinieri Litard. in Bull. Soc. Bot. France 84: 101 (1937)
- Festuca saxifraga Miégev. in Bull. Soc. Bot. France 38: xxxviii (1891)
- Festuca segimonensis Fuente & Ortúñez in Anales Jard. Bot. Madrid 57: 178 (1999)
