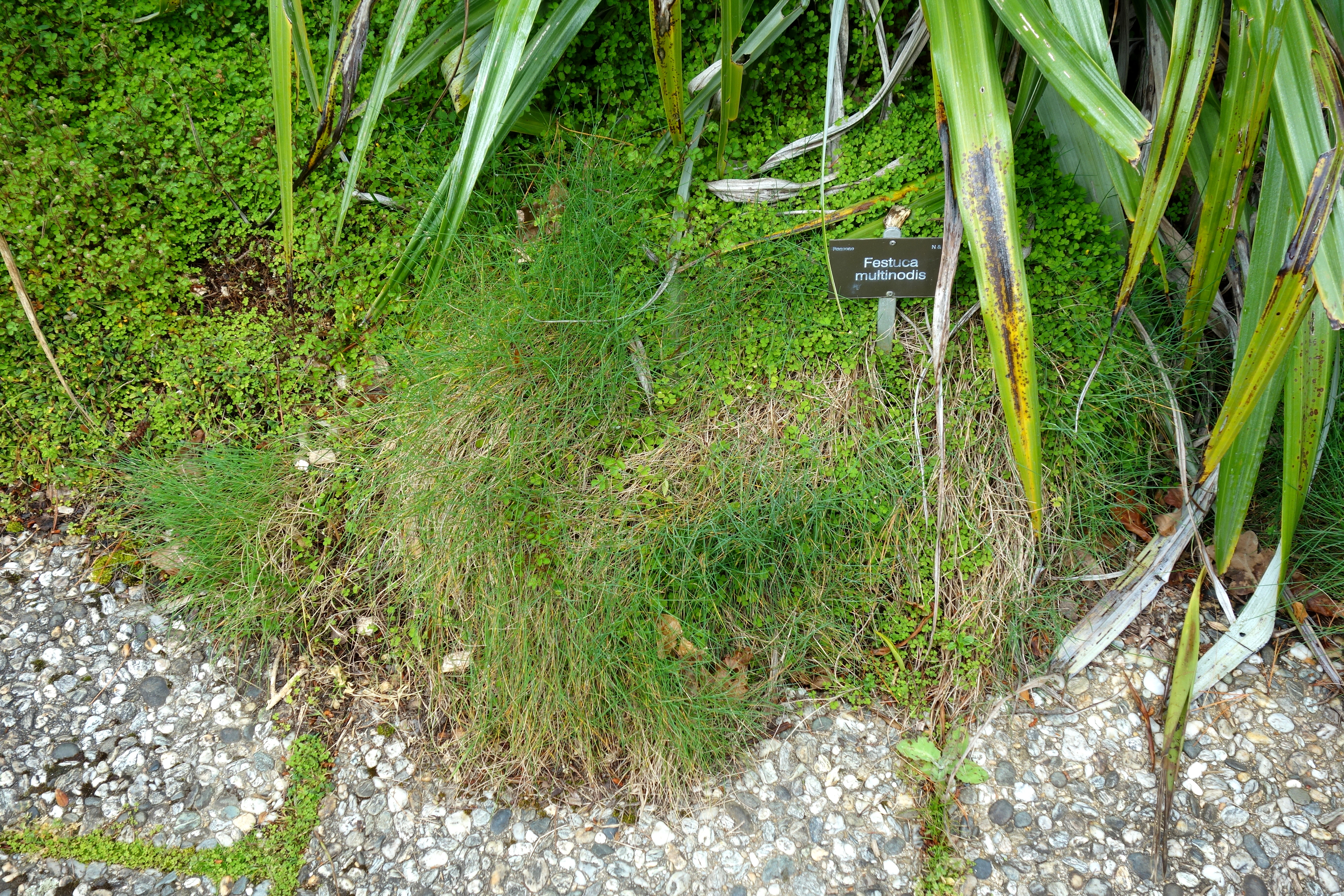

Scientific classification
- Kingdom: Plantae
- Clade: Tracheophytes
- Clade: Angiosperms
- Clade: Monocots
- Clade: Commelinids
- Order: Poales
- Family: Poaceae
- Subfamily: Pooideae
- Genus: Festuca
- Species: F. multinodis

Binomial name
- Festuca multinodis Petrie & Hack.

= Festuca multinodis =

Species of grass

Festuca multinodis is a species of grass in the family Poaceae. It is native to New Zealand and was first described in 1912. It is perennial and grows in temperate biomes.
