= Festuca dasyclada =

Scientific classification
- Kingdom: Plantae
- Clade: Tracheophytes
- Clade: Angiosperms
- Clade: Monocots
- Clade: Commelinids
- Order: Poales
- Family: Poaceae
- Subfamily: Pooideae
- Genus: Festuca
- Species: F. dasyclada

Binomial name
- Festuca dasyclada (St.-Yves) V.I.Krecz. & Bobrov

Synonyms
- Festuca ovina var. dahurica St.-Yves in Bull. Soc. Bot. France 71: 40 (1924); Festuca dahurica subsp. mongolica S.R.Liou & Ma in Fl. Intramongolica 7: 261 (1983)

Species of grass

Festuca dasyclada, also known as the oil shale fescue, is a species of grass in the family Poaceae. This species is native to Buryatiya, China North-Central, Chita, Inner Mongolia, Manchuria, Mongolia, and Qinghai. Festuca dasyclada was first described in 1934.

== Habitat ==
It is perennial and prefers temperate biomes.
