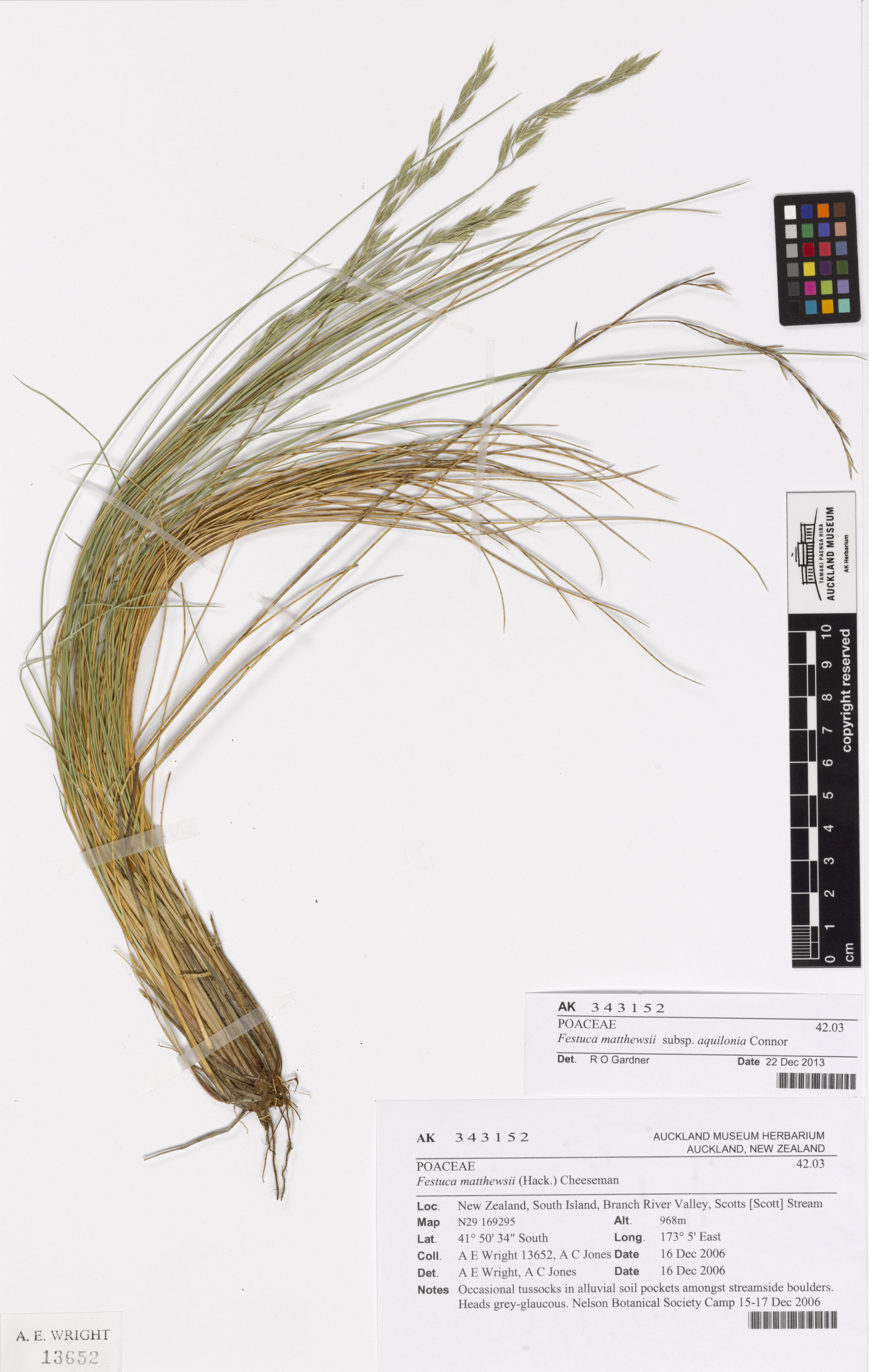

Scientific classification
- Kingdom: Plantae
- Clade: Tracheophytes
- Clade: Angiosperms
- Clade: Monocots
- Clade: Commelinids
- Order: Poales
- Family: Poaceae
- Subfamily: Pooideae
- Genus: Festuca
- Species: F. matthewsii

Binomial name
- Festuca matthewsii (Hack.) Cheeseman

Synonyms
- Festuca ovina var. matthewsii (Hack.) Cheeseman in Man. New Zealand Fl.: 918 (1906); Festuca ovina subsp. matthewsii Hack. in Trans. & Proc. New Zealand Inst. 35: 385 (1903)

= Festuca matthewsii =

Species of grass in New Zealand

Festuca matthewsii, also known as Matthew's fescue, is a species of grass in the family Poaceae. It is native to the South Island of New Zealand. It is perennial and mainly grows on subalpine or subarctic biomes. Festuca matthewsii was first described by Eduard Hackel in 1903 as Festuca ovina subsp. matthewsii, and identified as a species by Thomas Cheeseman in the posthumously released second edition of the Manual of the New Zealand Flora in 1925.

Accepted Infraspecifics:

- Festuca matthewsii subsp. aquilonia Connor
- Festuca matthewsii subsp. latifundii Connor
- Festuca matthewsii subsp. matthewsii
- Festuca matthewsii subsp. pisamontis Connor

== Description ==
Cheeseman published this description posthumously in 1925:

Culms erect, quite smooth and glabrous, 12–24 in. high, 2-noded; upper node about the middle of the culm. Innovation-shoots few-leaved, elongate. Leaves almost equalling the culms, narrow-linear, complicate, acute at the tip, furnished at the base with a brown pulvinate callus, glabrous without, ribbed when dry, puberulous within, 5-nerved, hexagonal in transverse section; sheaths rather lax, open, quite smooth; ligules 2-lobed, lobes acute, ciliolate. Panicle 3–6 in. long, ovate-oblong, lax, spreading, nodding; rhachis and branches scabrid; the latter binate, naked at the base, 1-3-spiculate at the top. Spikelets large, ovate-lanceolate, 5—7-flowered, ½-⅔ in. long, dense-fiowered, the upper shortly pedicelled, the remainder long-pedicelled. Two outer glumes unequal, lanceolate, acute, smooth. Flowering glumes linear-lanceolate, acute, narrowed into a rather long awn. Palea as long as or longer than the flowering glume, subulately bidentate; keels scaberulous.
