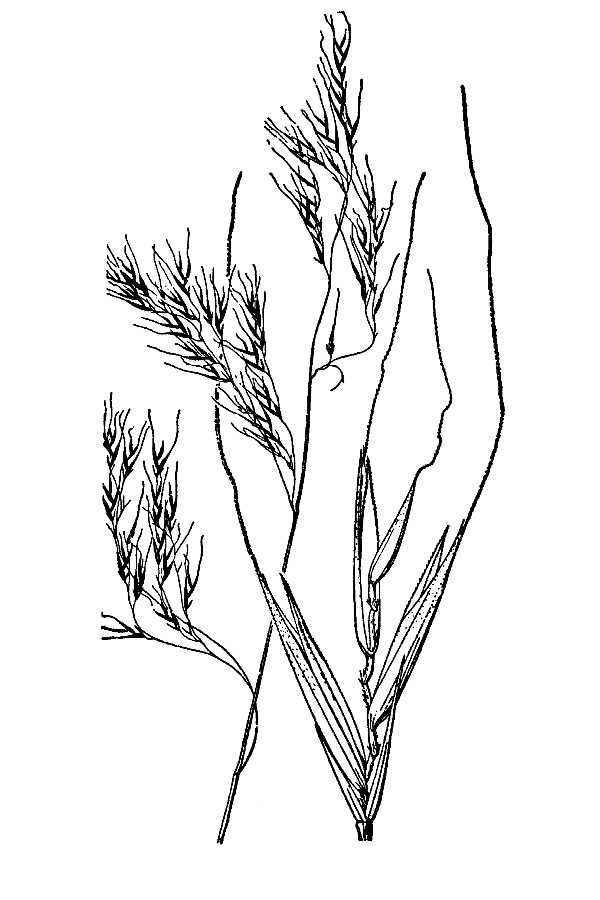

Scientific classification
- Kingdom: Plantae
- Clade: Tracheophytes
- Clade: Angiosperms
- Clade: Monocots
- Clade: Commelinids
- Order: Poales
- Family: Poaceae
- Subfamily: Pooideae
- Genus: Festuca
- Species: F. subuliflora

Binomial name
- Festuca subuliflora Scribn.

= Festuca subuliflora =

Species of flowering plant

Festuca subuliflora is a species of grass known by the common name crinkleawn fescue. It is native to western North America from British Columbia to California where it is most abundant in the moist forests of the coastal mountains.

== Description ==
This fescue is a loosely clumping perennial bunchgrass with stems reaching one half to over one meter in height. It has many soft, flat, somewhat hairy leaves which often have prominent ribs. The drooping inflorescence has narrow spikelets with awns up to 15 millimeters long which are often, but not always, crinkled.
