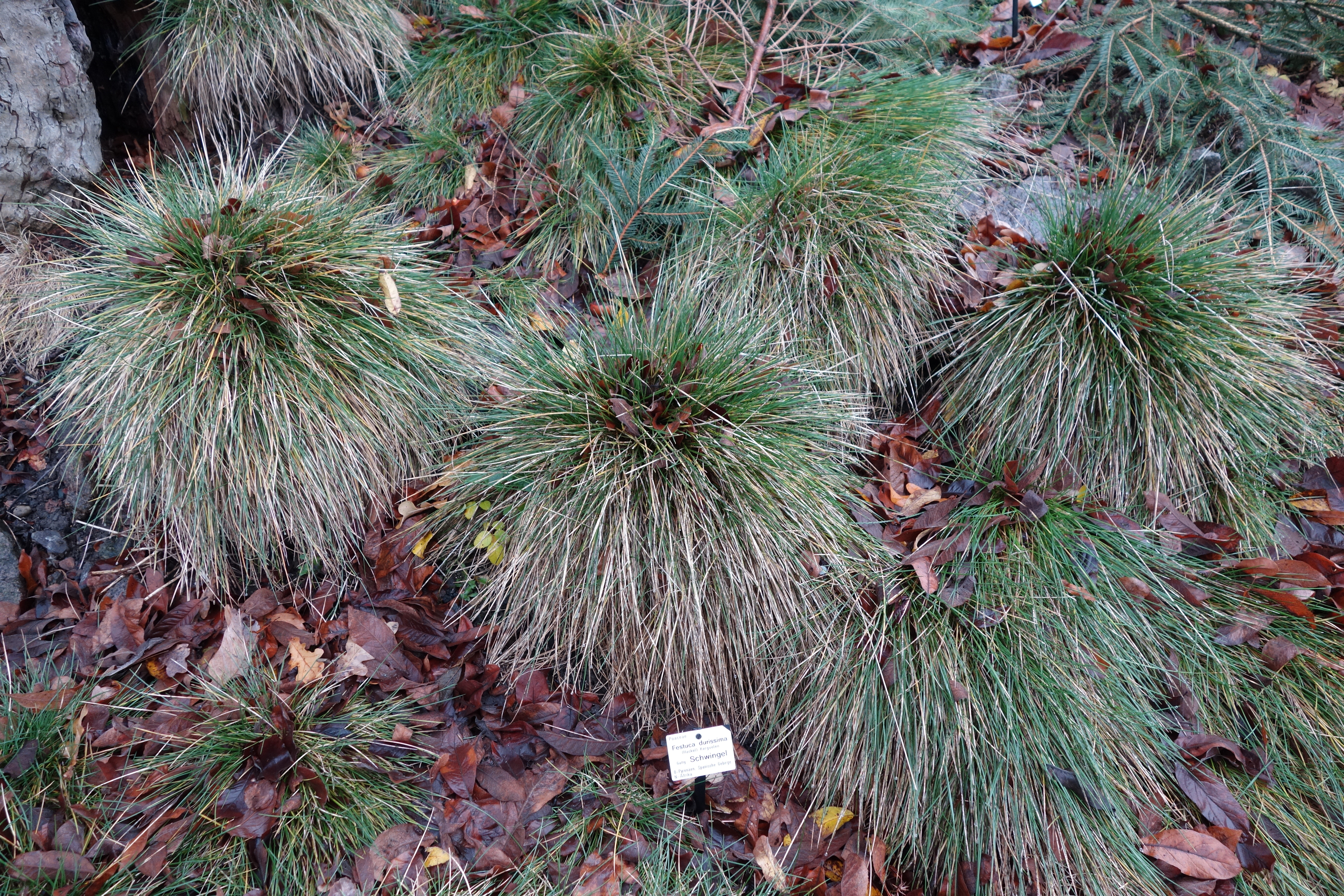

Scientific classification
- Kingdom: Plantae
- Clade: Tracheophytes
- Clade: Angiosperms
- Clade: Monocots
- Clade: Commelinids
- Order: Poales
- Family: Poaceae
- Subfamily: Pooideae
- Genus: Festuca
- Species: F. durissima

Binomial name
- Festuca durissima (Hack.) Kerguélen

= Festuca durissima =

Species of grass

Festuca durissima is a species of grass.

== Synonyms ==
- Festuca duriuscula subsp. durissima (Hack.) K.Richt.
- Festuca duriuscula var. durissima (Hack.) A.G. Richt.
- Festuca indigesta subsp. durissima (Hack.) O.Bolòs, Vigo, Masalles & Ninot
- Festuca ovina subsp. durissima (Hack.) O.Bolòs & Vigo
- Festuca ovina f. villiflora Litard.
- Festuca ruscinonensis Rivas Mart. & Fuente
- Festuca yvesii Sennen & Pau
