= Festuca sinensis =

Scientific classification
- Kingdom: Plantae
- Clade: Tracheophytes
- Clade: Angiosperms
- Clade: Monocots
- Clade: Commelinids
- Order: Poales
- Family: Poaceae
- Subfamily: Pooideae
- Genus: Festuca
- Species: F. sinensis

Binomial name
- Festuca sinensis Keng ex. E.B.Alexeev (1988)

Species of grass

Festuca sinensis is a species of grass in the family Poaceae. It is endemic to China. It is perennial and mainly grows in temperate biomes. It was first described in 1988 by Evgenii Borisovich Alexeev.
