= Festuca brunnescens =

Scientific classification
- Kingdom: Plantae
- Clade: Tracheophytes
- Clade: Angiosperms
- Clade: Monocots
- Clade: Commelinids
- Order: Poales
- Family: Poaceae
- Subfamily: Pooideae
- Genus: Festuca
- Species: F. brunnescens

Binomial name
- Festuca brunnescens (Tzvelev) Galushko

Synonyms
- Festuca rupicola subsp. brunnescens Tzvelev in Bot. Zhurn. (Moscow & Leningrad) 56: 1255 (1971); Festuca valesiaca subsp. brunnescens (Tzvelev) E.B.Alexeev in Byull. Moskovsk. Obshch. Isp. Prir., Otd. Biol., n.s., 78(3); Festuca sulcata var. brunnescens Hack. ex Grossh. in Fl. Kavkaza, ed. 2, 1: 288 (1939), no Latin descr.

Species of grass

Festuca brunnescens is a species of grass in the family Poaceae. The species was first published in 1976. This species is native to Iran, North Caucasus, Transcaucasus and Turkey.

== Etymology ==
The specific name brunnescens came from 'brunne' and 'scens', which together in english mean 'brownish'.

== Habitat ==
Festuca brunnescens is perennial and mainly grows in temperate biomes.
