= Festuca densipaniculata =

Conservation status
- Endangered (IUCN 3.1)

Scientific classification
- Kingdom: Plantae
- Clade: Tracheophytes
- Clade: Angiosperms
- Clade: Monocots
- Clade: Commelinids
- Order: Poales
- Family: Poaceae
- Subfamily: Pooideae
- Genus: Festuca
- Species: F. densipaniculata

Binomial name
- Festuca densipaniculata E.B.Alexeev

Species of grass

Festuca densipaniculata is a species of grass in the family Poaceae. It is found only in Ecuador.
