= Festuca alatavica =

Scientific classification
- Kingdom: Plantae
- Clade: Embryophytes
- Clade: Tracheophytes
- Clade: Spermatophytes
- Clade: Angiosperms
- Clade: Monocots
- Clade: Commelinids
- Order: Poales
- Family: Poaceae
- Subfamily: Pooideae
- Genus: Festuca
- Species: F. alatavica

Binomial name
- Festuca alatavica (St.-Yves) Roshev.

Species of plant

Festuca alatavica is a species in the grass family Poaceae. It was first described in 1934 by Alfred (Marie Augustine) Saint-Yves. It is native to Central Asia and West Himalaya. It is perennial and grows in temperate biomes.

== Characteristics ==
This species is accepted and is heavily tufted and shortly rhizomatous, the culms of this species are about 80–90 centimetres (31–35 in) tall, stem blades are about 2–4 centimetres (0.79–1.57 in) long, and florets grow about 4–6 centimetres (1.6–2.4 in) tall.
