= Festuca lenensis =

Scientific classification
- Kingdom: Plantae
- Clade: Tracheophytes
- Clade: Angiosperms
- Clade: Monocots
- Clade: Commelinids
- Order: Poales
- Family: Poaceae
- Subfamily: Pooideae
- Genus: Festuca
- Species: F. lenensis

Binomial name
- Festuca lenensis Drobow

Synonyms
- Festuca albifolia Reverd. in Sist. Zametki Mater. Gerb. Krylova Tomsk. Gosud. Univ. Kuybysheva 1936(3): 2 (1936); Festuca lenensis subsp. albifolia (Reverd.) Tzvelev in Bot. Zhurn. (Moscow & Leningrad) 56: 1254 (1971); Festuca lenensis var. villosula Kozhevn. in Bot. Zhurn. (Moscow & Leningrad) 59: 511 (1974)

Species of grass

Festuca lenensis, also known as the Tundra Fescue, is a species of grass in the family Poaceae. It is native throughout Siberia to the far east of Russia and Subarctic America. It is perennial, and mainly grows in subalpine or subarctic biomes. Festuca lenensis was first published in 1915.
