= Festuca pyrenaica =

Scientific classification
- Kingdom: Plantae
- Clade: Tracheophytes
- Clade: Angiosperms
- Clade: Monocots
- Clade: Commelinids
- Order: Poales
- Family: Poaceae
- Subfamily: Pooideae
- Genus: Festuca
- Species: F. pyrenaica

Binomial name
- Festuca pyrenaica Reut. (1861)

Synonyms
- Festuca rubra subsp. pyrenaica (Reut.) Hack. (1882); Festuca rubra var. pyrenaica (Reut.) Vallot (1885); Festuca violacea subsp. pyrenaica (Reut.) Nyman (1882); Festuca stolonifera Miégev. (1863)

Species of grass

Festuca pyrenaica is a species of grass in the family Poaceae. It is native to the Pyrenees. It is perennial and prefers to grow in temperate biomes. It was first described in 1861.
