= Festuca burnatii =

Scientific classification
- Kingdom: Plantae
- Clade: Tracheophytes
- Clade: Angiosperms
- Clade: Monocots
- Clade: Commelinids
- Order: Poales
- Family: Poaceae
- Subfamily: Pooideae
- Genus: Festuca
- Species: F. burnatii

Binomial name
- Festuca burnatii St.-Yves

Species of grass

Festuca burnatii is a species of grass in the family Poaceae. It is found in Spain. It was first published in 1913.
