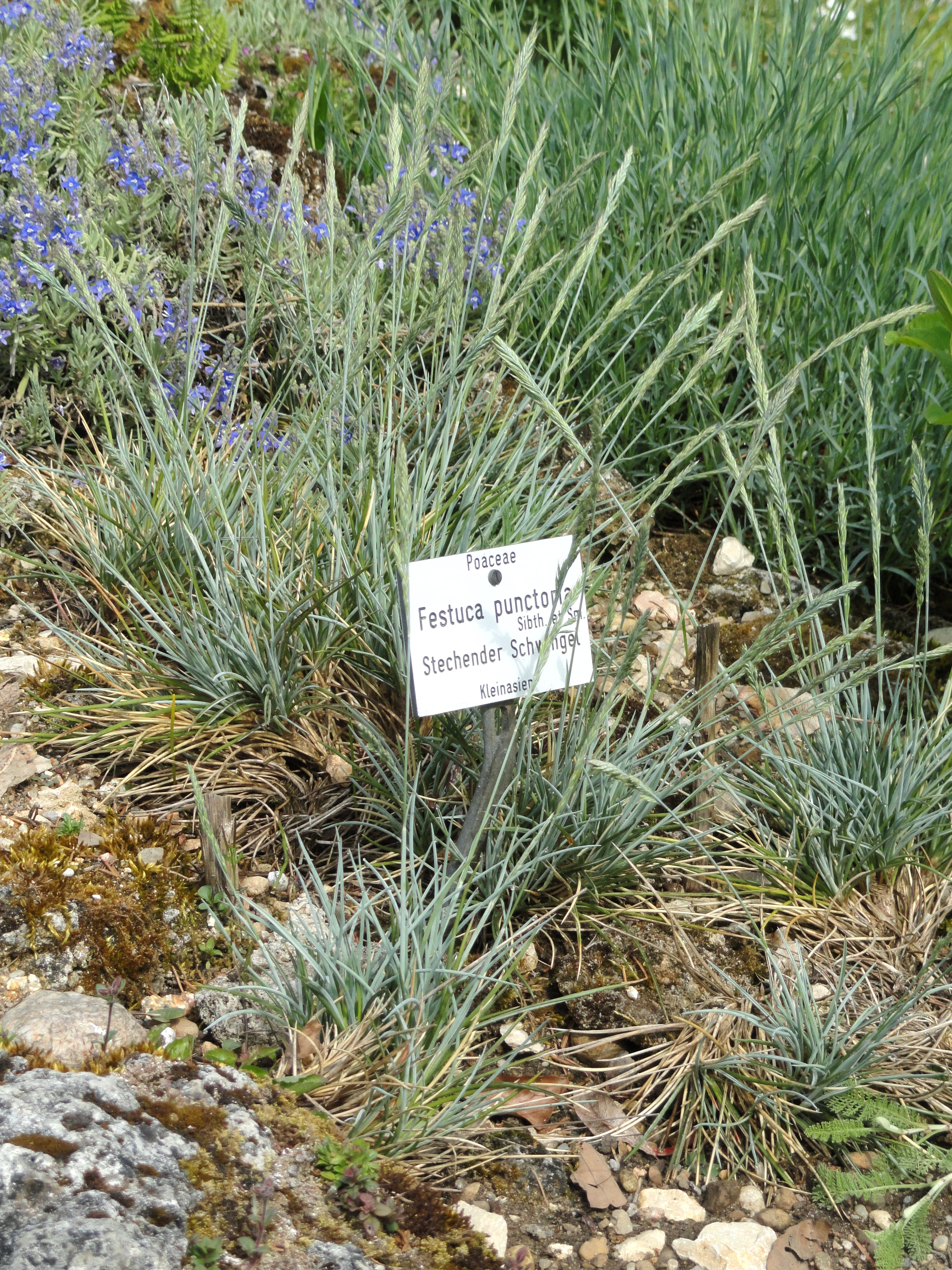
- Festuca punctoria specimen in the Botanischer Garten München-Nymphenburg, Munich, Germany.

Scientific classification
- Kingdom: Plantae
- Clade: Tracheophytes
- Clade: Angiosperms
- Clade: Monocots
- Clade: Commelinids
- Order: Poales
- Family: Poaceae
- Subfamily: Pooideae
- Genus: Festuca
- Species: F. punctoria

Binomial name
- Festuca punctoria Sm. (1806)

Synonyms
- Festuca ovina var. punctoria (Sm.) St.-Yves (1925); Festuca acerosa K.Koch (1846)

= Festuca punctoria =

Species of grass

Festuca punctoria is a species of grass in the family Poaceae. It is native to northwestern Turkey. It is perennial and grows in temperate biomes. It was described in 1806.
