= Festuca sodiroana =

Conservation status
- Least Concern (IUCN 3.1)

Scientific classification
- Kingdom: Plantae
- Clade: Tracheophytes
- Clade: Angiosperms
- Clade: Monocots
- Clade: Commelinids
- Order: Poales
- Family: Poaceae
- Subfamily: Pooideae
- Genus: Festuca
- Species: F. sodiroana

Binomial name
- Festuca sodiroana Hack. ex E.B.Alexeev

Species of grass

Festuca sodiroana is a species of grass in the family Poaceae. Its habitat spans from southern Ecuador to northern Colombia. It grows at 2600–3800 meters elevation in forest clearings and margins of brooks or rivers.
