= Festuca pulchra =

Scientific classification
- Kingdom: Plantae
- Clade: Tracheophytes
- Clade: Angiosperms
- Clade: Monocots
- Clade: Commelinids
- Order: Poales
- Family: Poaceae
- Subfamily: Pooideae
- Genus: Festuca
- Species: F. pulchra

Binomial name
- Festuca pulchra Schur (1866)

Synonyms
- Festuca boghisensis Prodan (1957); Festuca compressa Kit.; Festuca duriuscula subsp. parviflora Hack.; Festuca duriuscula var. tenuis Hack.; Festuca ovina var. dura Hack.; Festuca ovina var. pseudovina (Hack. ex Wiesb.) Hack.; Festuca ovina subvar. salina; Festuca pseudovina Hack.; Festuca pseudovina f. angustiflora (Hack.) Reverd.; Festuca pseudovina f. barbulata Nyár.; Festuca pseudovina f. capillifolia Reverd.; Festuca pseudovina f. ciliata Reverd.; Festuca pseudovina f. compacta Reverd.; Festuca pseudovina f. gracilior Reverd.; Festuca pseudovina f. hirtiflora Borbás; Festuca pseudovina var. minutiflora Reverd.; Festuca pseudovina var. rutila Hack. ex Jáv.; Festuca pseudovina f. rutila (Hack. ex Jáv.) Soó; Festuca pseudovina var. salina (A.Kern. ex Hack.) Soó; Festuca pseudovina f. salina (A.Kern. ex Hack.) Soó; Festuca pseudovina f. subpruinosa Borbás; Festuca racemosa Kit.; Festuca sulcata var. angustiflora Hack.; Festuca valesiaca f. krajinae Soó; Festuca valesiaca subsp. parviflora (Hack.) R.Tracey; Festuca valesiaca var. pseudovina (Hack. ex Wiesb.) Schinz & R.Keller; Festuca valesiaca subsp. pseudovina (Hack. ex Wiesb.) Hegi; Festuca valesiaca var. tenuis (Hack.) Krajina

Species of grass

Festuca pulchra is a species of grass in the family Poaceae. It is native to temperate Eurasia, ranging from Central Europe to China. It is perennial and prefers to grow in temperate biomes. It was first described in 1866.
