= Festuca circinata =

Scientific classification
- Kingdom: Plantae
- Clade: Tracheophytes
- Clade: Angiosperms
- Clade: Monocots
- Clade: Commelinids
- Order: Poales
- Family: Poaceae
- Subfamily: Pooideae
- Genus: Festuca
- Species: F. circinata

Binomial name
- Festuca circinata Griseb.

Species of grass

Festuca circinata is a species of grass in the family Poaceae. This species is native to Argentina Northeast and Northwest, and prefers temperate biomes. This species was first described in 1879.
