= Festuca djimilensis =

Scientific classification
- Kingdom: Plantae
- Clade: Tracheophytes
- Clade: Angiosperms
- Clade: Monocots
- Clade: Commelinids
- Order: Poales
- Family: Poaceae
- Subfamily: Pooideae
- Genus: Festuca
- Species: F. djimilensis

Binomial name
- Festuca djimilensis Boiss. & Balansa

Synonyms
- Festuca rubra var. djimilensis (Boiss. & Balansa) Hack. ex Boiss. in Fl. Orient. 5: 621 (1884); Festuca calceolaris Sommier & Levier in Nuovo Giorn. Bot. Ital., n.s., 4: 211 (1897)

Species of grass

Festuca djimilensis is a species of grass in the family Poaceae. This species is native to North Caucasus, Transcaucasus, and Turkey. Festuca djimilensis was first described in 1874.

== Habitat ==
Is perennial and prefers temperate biomes.
