= Festuca extremiorientalis =

Scientific classification
- Kingdom: Plantae
- Clade: Tracheophytes
- Clade: Angiosperms
- Clade: Monocots
- Clade: Commelinids
- Order: Poales
- Family: Poaceae
- Subfamily: Pooideae
- Genus: Festuca
- Species: F. extremiorientalis

Binomial name
- Festuca extremiorientalis Ohwi

Synonyms
- Festuca iwamotoi Honda in Bot. Mag. (Tokyo) 47: 435 (1933); Festuca subulata var. japonica Hack. in Bull. Herb. Boissier 6: 113 (1898); Festuca subulata subsp. japonica (Hack.) T.Koyama & Kawano in Canad. J. Bot. 42: 875 (1964)

Species of grass

Festuca extremiorientalis is a species of grass in the family Poaceae. This species is native to Altay, Amur, Buryatiya, China North-Central, China South-Central, Chita, Inner Mongolia, Irkutsk, Japan, Khabarovsk, Korea, Krasnoyarsk, Kuril Is., Manchuria, Primorye, Qinghai, Sakhalin, and Tuva. Is perennial and prefers temperate biomes. This species was first described in 1931.
