= Festuca elegans =

Scientific classification
- Kingdom: Plantae
- Clade: Tracheophytes
- Clade: Angiosperms
- Clade: Monocots
- Clade: Commelinids
- Order: Poales
- Family: Poaceae
- Subfamily: Pooideae
- Genus: Festuca
- Species: F. elegans

Binomial name
- Festuca elegans Boiss.

Synonyms
- Festuca elegans subsp. merinoi (Pau) Fuente & Ortúñez; Festuca merinoi Pau

Species of grass

Festuca elegans is a species of grass in the family Poaceae. This species is native to Morocco, Portugal, and Spain. Is perennial and prefers temperate biomes. Festuca elegans was first described in 1838.
