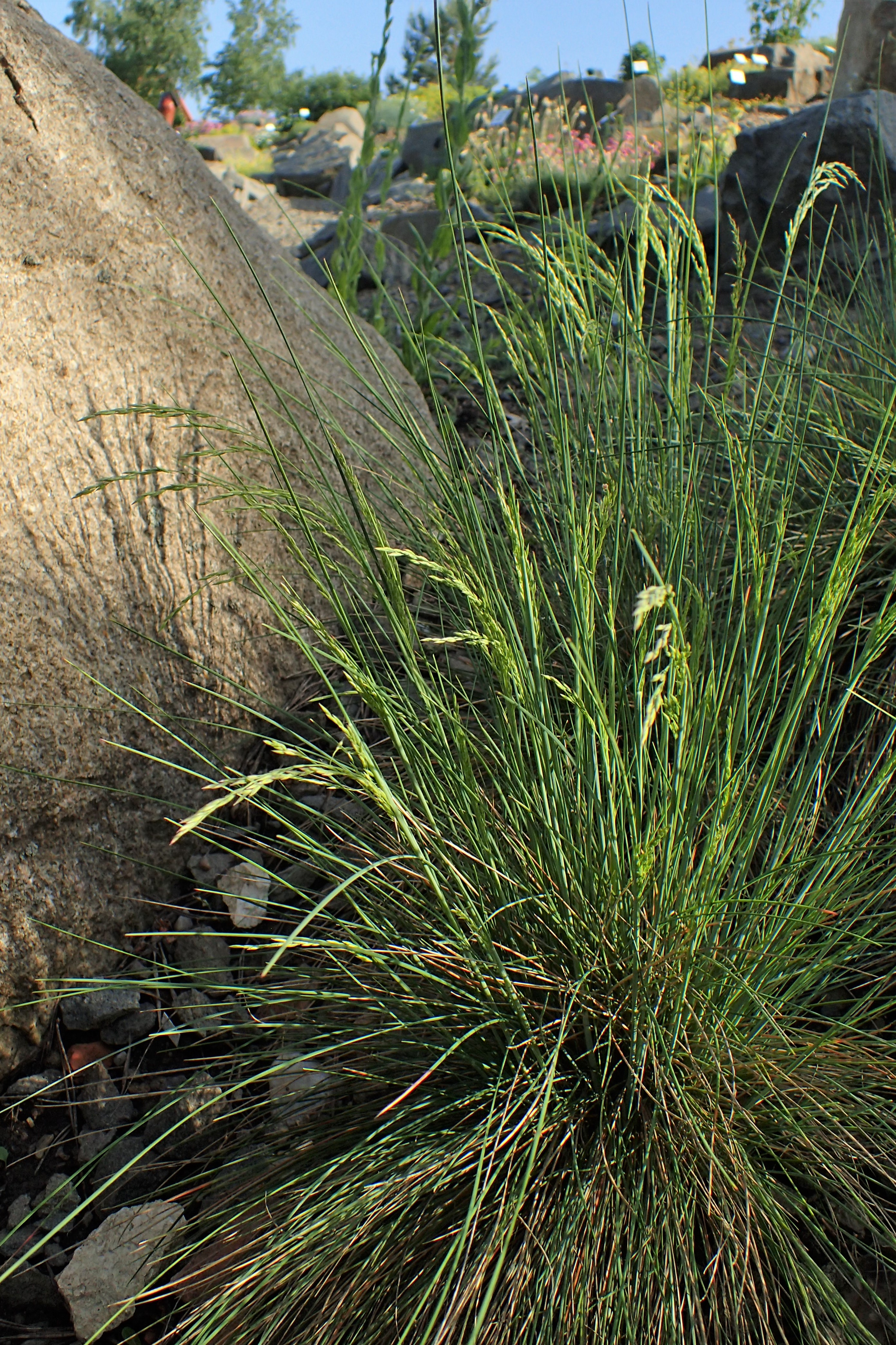

Conservation status
- Least Concern (IUCN 3.1)

Scientific classification
- Kingdom: Plantae
- Clade: Tracheophytes
- Clade: Angiosperms
- Clade: Monocots
- Clade: Commelinids
- Order: Poales
- Family: Poaceae
- Subfamily: Pooideae
- Genus: Festuca
- Species: F. tatrae

Binomial name
- Festuca tatrae (Czakó) Degen

= Festuca tatrae =

Species of grass

Festuca tatrae is a species of grass in the family Poaceae. The species was first published in 1904. This species is native to West Carpathians.

== Habitat ==
Festuca tatrae is perennial and mainly grows in temperate biomes.
