= Festuca vaginalis =

Conservation status
- Least Concern (IUCN 3.1)

Scientific classification
- Kingdom: Plantae
- Clade: Tracheophytes
- Clade: Angiosperms
- Clade: Monocots
- Clade: Commelinids
- Order: Poales
- Family: Poaceae
- Subfamily: Pooideae
- Genus: Festuca
- Species: F. vaginalis

Binomial name
- Festuca vaginalis (Benth.) Lægaard

Species of grass

Festuca vaginalis is a species of grass. It is found only in Ecuador.
