= Festuca callieri =

Scientific classification
- Kingdom: Plantae
- Clade: Tracheophytes
- Clade: Angiosperms
- Clade: Monocots
- Clade: Commelinids
- Order: Poales
- Family: Poaceae
- Subfamily: Pooideae
- Genus: Festuca
- Species: F. callieri

Binomial name
- Festuca callieri Markgr.

Synonyms
- Festuca callieri f. hirta (A.Nyár.) Beldie in T.Săvulescu, Fl. Republ. Socialist. România 12: 541 (1972); Festuca callieri subsp. zederbaueri Markgr.-Dann. in Willdenowia 11: 207 (1981); Festuca constantae Nyár. & Prodan in Bul. Şti. Acad. Republ. Populare Romîne, Secţ. Biol. Şti. Agric. 8: 70 (1957); Festuca ovina var. argaea Hack. in Ann. K. K. Naturhist. Hofmus. 20: 432 (1905); Festuca ovina subvar. trojana Hack. ex St.-Yves in Candollea 3: 355 (1928); Festuca pallens f. hirta A.Nyár. in Stud. Cercet. Biol. (Bucharest), Ser. Bot. 15: 122 (1964); Festuca valesiaca f. hirta (A.Nyár.) Beldie in T.Săvulescu, Fl. Republ. Socialist. România 12: 546 (1972); Festuca ovina var. callieri Hack. ex St.-Yves in Candollea 3: 347 (1928)

Species of grass

Festuca callieri is a species of grass in the family Poaceae. This species is perennial and grows mainly in temperate biomes. The name was published in 1932. Festuca callieri is native to Bulgaria, Greece, Crimea, Lebanon, Syria, North Caucasus, Romania, Transcaucasus, Turkey, Turkey-in-Europe, and Yugoslavia.
