= Festuca juncifolia =

Scientific classification
- Kingdom: Plantae
- Clade: Tracheophytes
- Clade: Angiosperms
- Clade: Monocots
- Clade: Commelinids
- Order: Poales
- Family: Poaceae
- Subfamily: Pooideae
- Genus: Festuca
- Species: F. juncifolia

Binomial name
- Festuca juncifolia St.-Amans

Species of grass

Festuca juncifolia is a species of grass in the family Poaceae. It is native to Belgium, France, Great Britain, Netherlands, and Spain, and was introduced in South Argentina. It is perennial and mainly grows in temperate biome. It was first published in 1821.
