= Locajonoa =

Scientific classification
- Kingdom: Plantae
- Clade: Tracheophytes
- Clade: Angiosperms
- Clade: Monocots
- Clade: Commelinids
- Order: Poales
- Family: Poaceae
- Subfamily: Pooideae
- Tribe: Poeae
- Subtribe: Loliinae
- Genus: Locajonoa; Soreng
- Species: L. coerulescens

Binomial name
- Locajonoa coerulescens (Desf.) Soreng

Synonyms
- Festuca bulbosa Biv. (1818), nom. illeg.; Festuca coerulescens Desf. (1798); Festuca oranensis Steud. (1854); Koeleria coerulescens (Desf.) Guss. (1832); Koeleria tunicata C.Presl (1818); Patzkea coerulescens (Desf.) H.Scholz (2010); Schedonorus coerulescens (Desf.) Roem. & Schult. (1817)

Genus of flowering plants

Locajonoa is a genus of grasses. It includes a single species, Locajonoa coerulescens, a perennial native to the western and central Mediterranean basin, from southern Spain to northwestern Africa (Morocco, Algeria, and Tunisia), Sicily, and southeastern Italy.
