= List of peaks named Shasta =

Shasta may refer to one of seven peaks in the United States:

Name	USGS link	State	Region	USGS map	Elevation	
Mount Shasta		Alaska	Valdez-Cordova	Valdez A-7	3,989 ft	1,216 m
Jackknife Mountain		Alaska	Dillingham	Dillingham B-8	1,995 ft	608 m
Mount Shasta		California	Siskiyou	Mount Shasta	14,179 ft	4,322 m
Shastarama Point		California	Siskiyou	Mount Shasta	11,102 ft	3,384 m
Shasta Bally		California	Shasta	Shasta Bally	6,174 ft	1,882 m
Shasta Butte		Idaho	Kootenai	Post Falls	4,823 ft	1,470 m
Shasta Butte		Oregon	Malheur	Bridgeport	6,083 ft	1,854 m

== See also ==
- Mount Shasta, California, a town in California at 41°18′36″N 122°18′38″W
- Mount Shasta Wilderness, also in California at 41°25′08″N 122°12′26″W
