= Mountain hut =

Building for food and shelter at high elevation

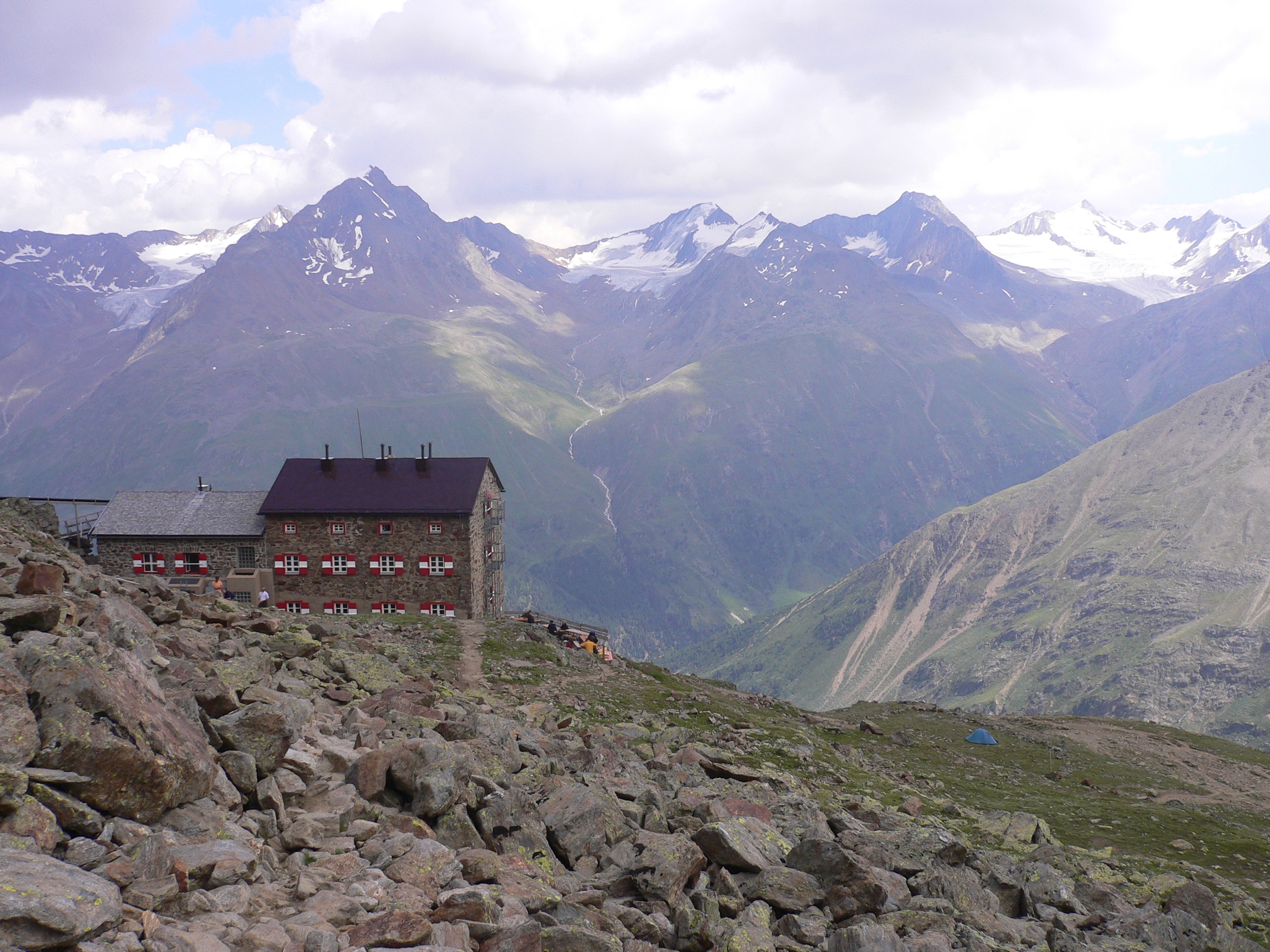
Breslauer Hütte (2,844 m) in the Ötztal Alps, Austria

A mountain hut is a building located at high elevation, in mountainous terrain, generally accessible only by foot, intended to provide food and shelter to mountaineers, climbers and hikers. Mountain huts are usually operated by an alpine club or some organization dedicated to hiking or mountain recreation. They are known by many names, including alpine hut, mountain shelter, mountain refuge, mountain lodge, and mountain hostel. It may also be called a refuge hut, although these occur in lowland areas (e.g. lowland forests) too.

Mountain huts can provide a range of services, starting with shelter and simple sleeping berths. Some, particularly in remote areas, are not staffed, but others have staff which prepare meals and drinks and can provide other services, including providing lectures and selling clothing and small items. Permanent staffing is not possible above the highest permanent human settlements, which are 5500m at the latitude of Everest (27°59′, similar to Corpus Christi, Texas) but lower than 3500m at the latitude of Mont Blanc (45°50', similar to Montreal, Quebec). Permanent staffing has been tried long ago e.g. at Vallot Hut (4362 m, .58 atm) in 1890–91 but had to stop after heart or lung problems apparently due to altitude and cold combined. Mountain huts usually allow anybody to access their facilities, although some require reservations.

While shelters have long existed in mountains, modern hut systems date back to the mid-19th century. The Swiss Alpine Club has built huts since 1863. In the United States, the Appalachian Mountain Club built its first hut at Madison Spring in New Hampshire in 1889.

== Huts ==
=== The Alps ===
The construction of refuges and shelters in the Alps dates back to ancient times, when Roman roads led across the mountain passes. In the High Middle Ages, hospitales were erected along the trade routes; cottages and sheds on the high mountain pastures served for Alpine transhumance. The long history of mountaineering from the 19th century onwards has led to a large number of Alpine club huts as well as private huts along the mountaineering paths. These huts are categorised according to their location and facilities. They may have beds or a mattress room (Matratzenlager, or bas-flancs in French, or sleeping berths), kind of simple or double-decker wide mattress where a few dozens people sleep aside one another, no matter same family or group or strangers, for overnight stays. More recent or more popular shelters have more comfortable sleeping arrangements.

Just as the Margherita Hut in the Valais Alps is the highest alpine refuge at 4,554 m, the Rifugio Mario Premuda in Trieste is the lowest refuge in the Alps at 82 m (both are owned by the Italian Alpine Club).

=== United Kingdom ===
In the United Kingdom the tradition is of unwardened "climbing huts" providing fairly rudimentary accommodation (but superior to that of a bothy) close to a climbing ground; the huts are usually conversions (e.g. of former quarrymen's cottages, or of disused mine buildings), and are not open to passers-by except in emergency. Many climbing clubs in the UK have such huts in Snowdonia or in the Lake District. A well-known example is the Charles Inglis Clark Memorial Hut (the 'CIC Hut'), a purpose-built hut below the northern crags of Ben Nevis in Scotland.

In the past, some shelters in Scotland were built in exposed locations at high elevation, often as part of military training exercises. However, and particularly following the 1971 Cairngorm Plateau Disaster, these were deliberately demolished because they were thought to pose dangers exceeding their benefits.

=== Norway ===
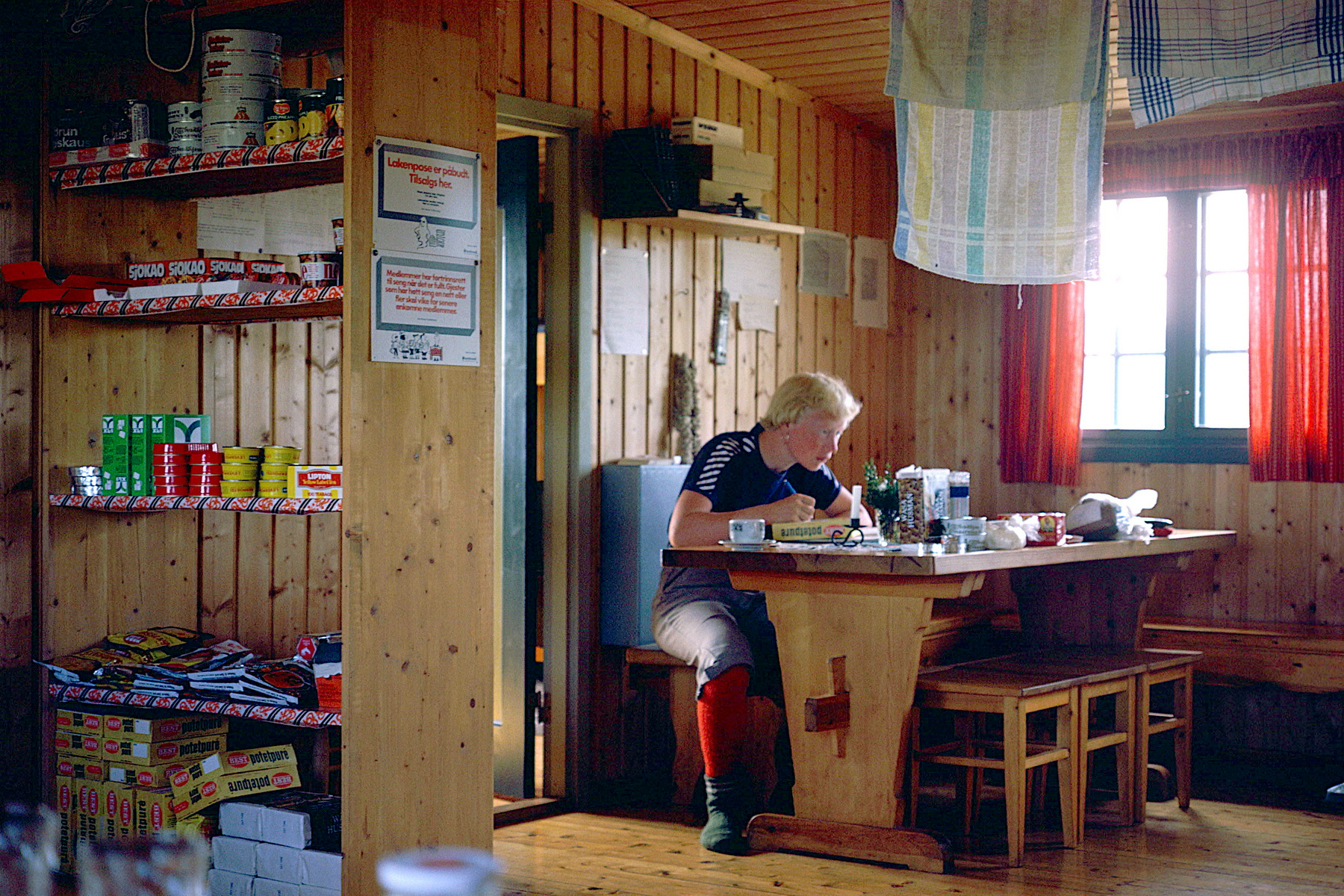
Oskampen self-service cabin in Norway

The Norwegian Trekking Association (DNT) operates about 600 cabins mostly in the mountains and in forested areas.

DNT offers three types of cabins: staffed lodges, self-service cabins and no-service cabins. Many cabins are unstaffed and open all year, while the staffed cabins often are just open during summer and the skiing season.

=== Poland ===
In Poland most mountain shelters and huts are run by the Polish Tourist and Sightseeing Society, with some being privately owned. In the Polish mountains, there are about 100 shelters. Most mountain shelters offer multi-person rooms and refreshments. Polish mountain huts are obliged by their own regulations to allow overnight anyone who is not able to find any other place before sunset, but conditions may be spartan (e.g. a mattress in a hall or warm basement).

=== Slovakia ===
In Slovakia there is a dense network of mountain huts ("chata") in most mountain and forest regions, serving a culture of hiking. In the past they were managed by the official tourist union, but now are mostly in private hands. Official mountain huts are similar to guest houses and are run by full-time managers. In winter, some refuges are closed.

=== United States ===
There are many huts in the United States, for example in the Rocky Mountains, the Appalachian Mountains and other ranges. The High Huts of the White Mountains in New Hampshire are generally "full service" (cooks serve food) through summer and early fall, while some are open the rest of the year as self-service huts, at which hikers bring and prepare their own food.

=== Canada ===
The Alpine Club of Canada operates what it calls the "largest network of backcountry huts in North America."

=== New Zealand ===
The New Zealand Department of Conservation "manages a network of over 950 huts of all shapes and sizes."

=== The Himalayas ===
The mountains of Asia do not have a well-developed system of public mountain huts, although hiking, trekking and mountain climbing are common. In 2015, a competition was launched to design huts that could be located along trekking trails of Nepal.

=== South Africa ===
Many places in Africa have hiking huts but they are usually privately owned and require payment and reservations. At least one hut is open for public use on Table Mountain in South Africa, part of Table Mountain National Park.

== Gallery ==
=== Europe ===
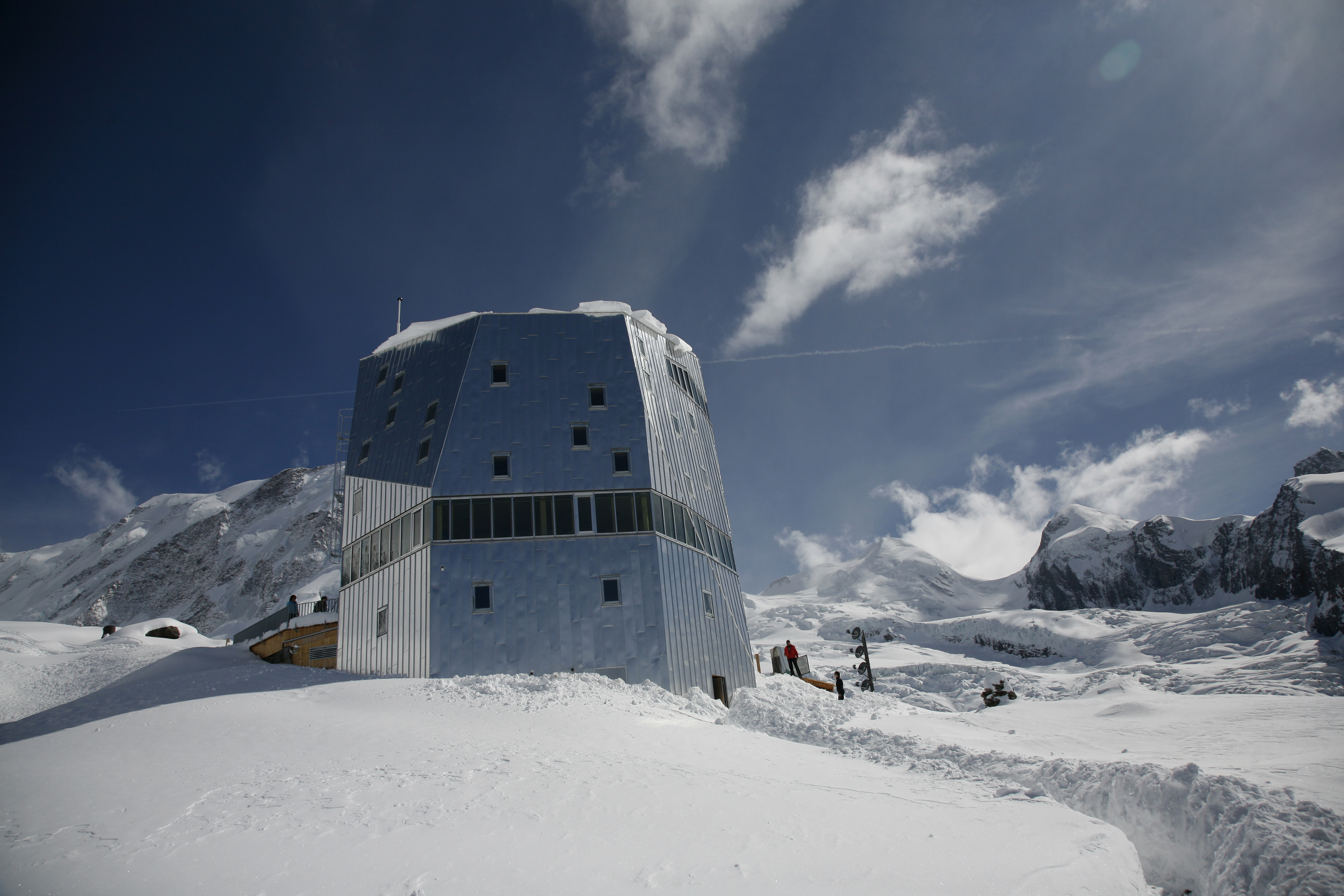
Monte Rosa Hut

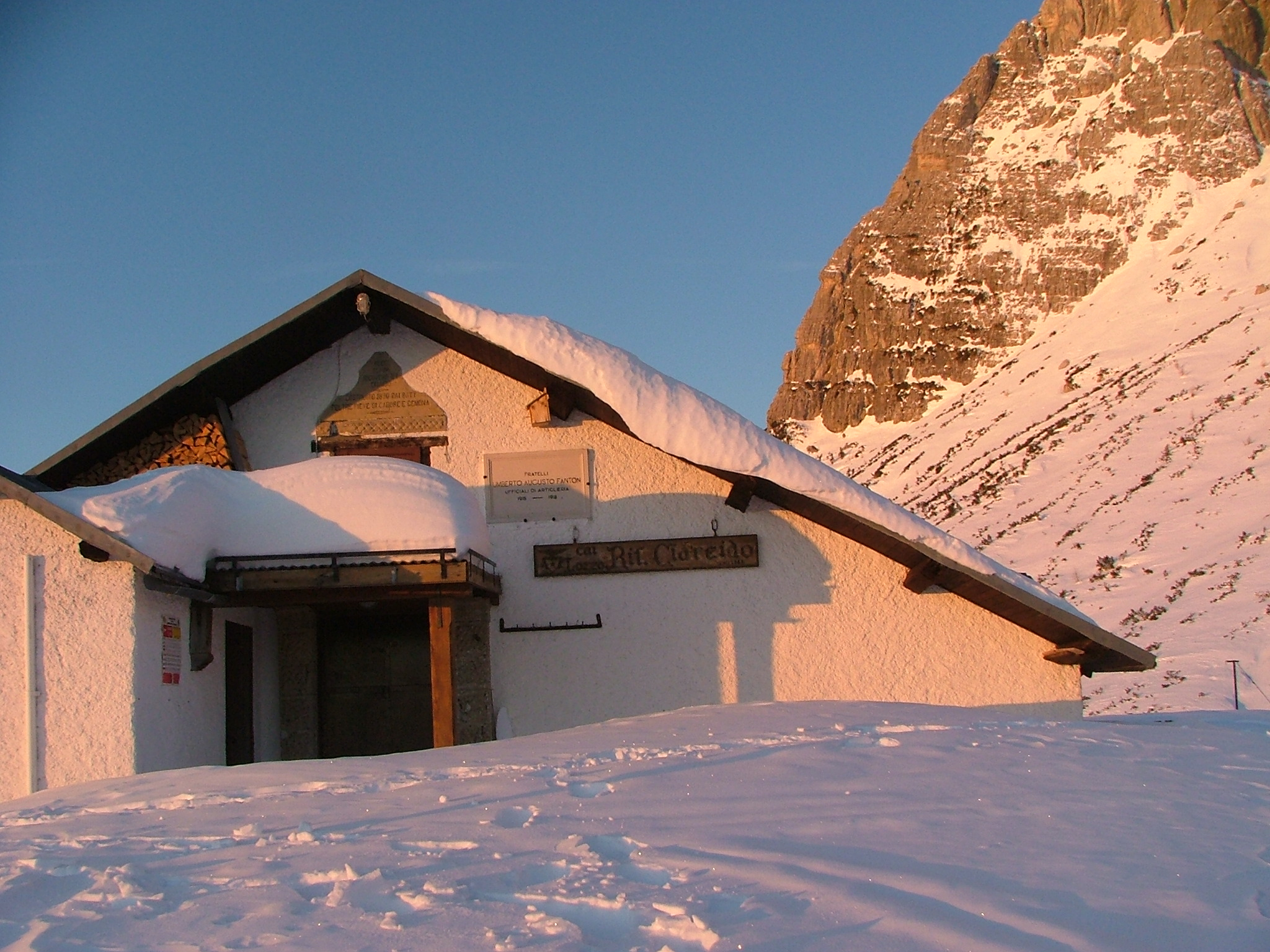
Ciareido hut, near Lozzo di Cadore in the Dolomites in Belluno, Italy

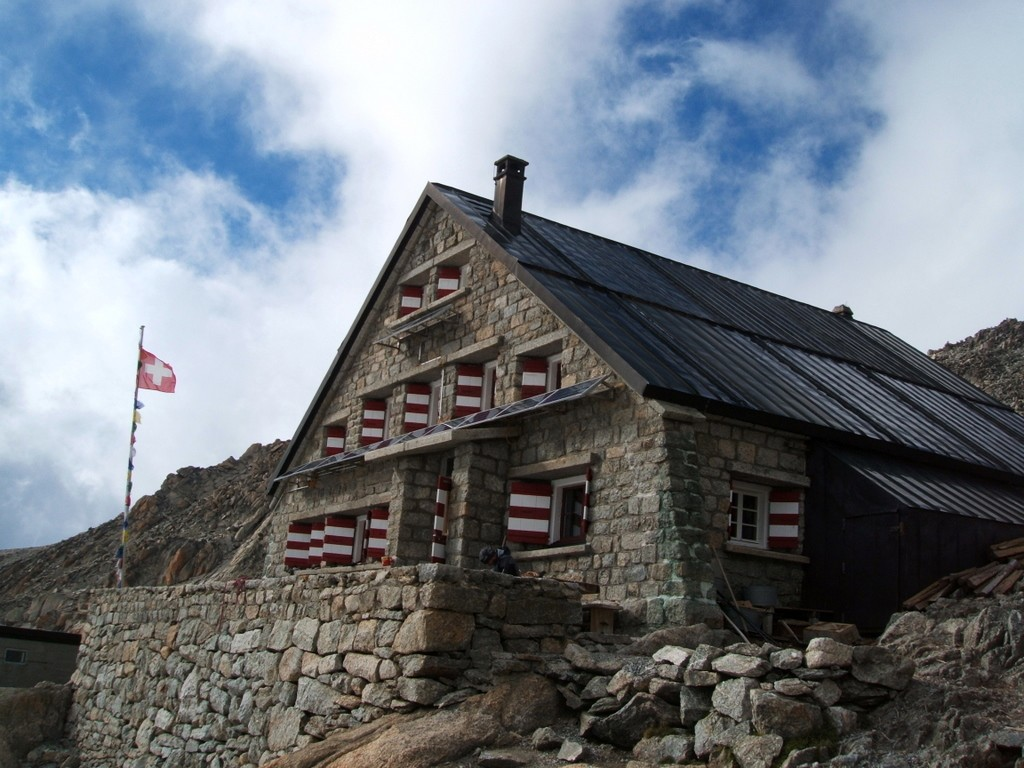
Cabane du Trient, Switzerland

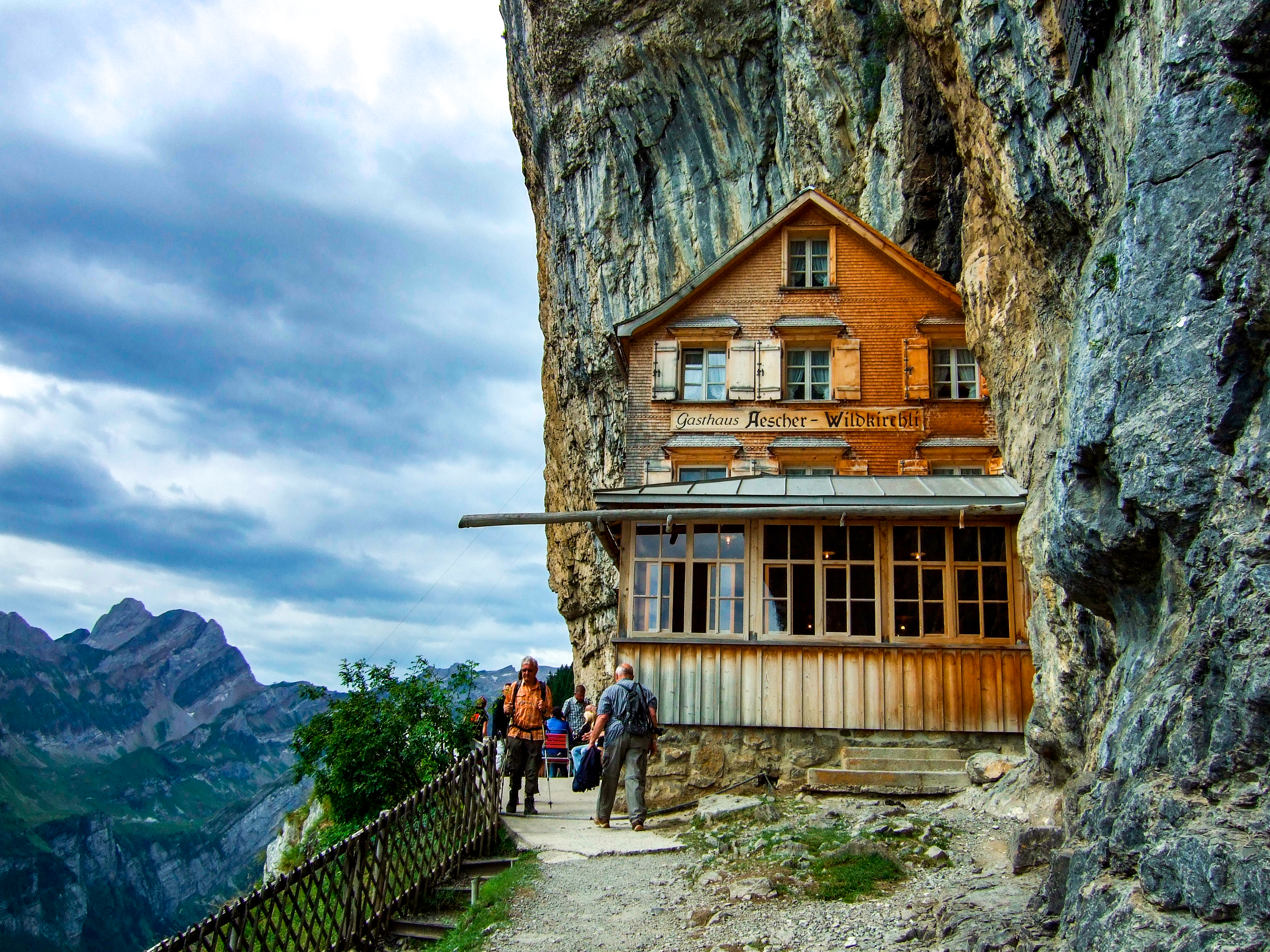
Berggasthaus Äscher, Switzerland

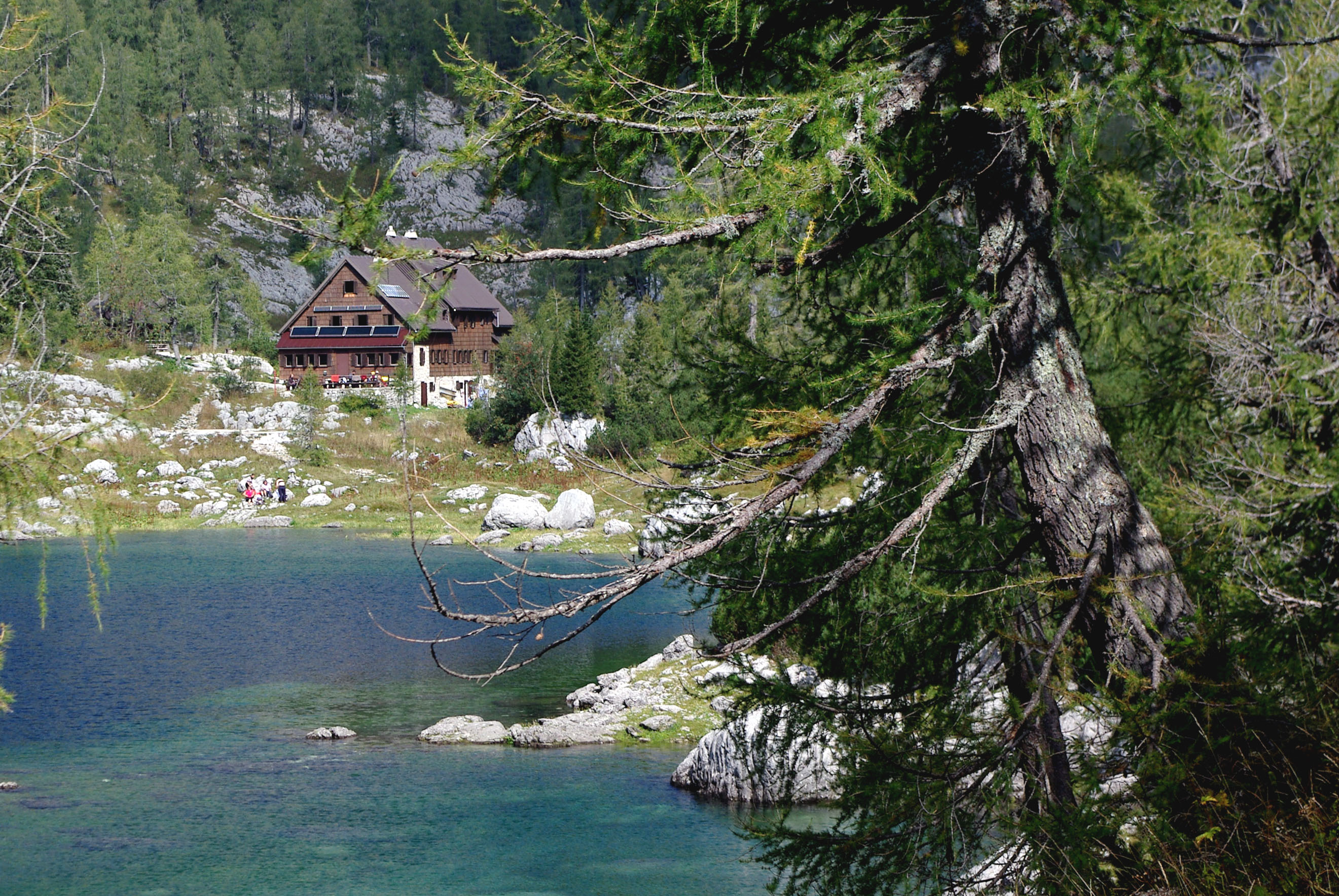
Triglav Lakes Lodge in Julian Alps, Slovenia

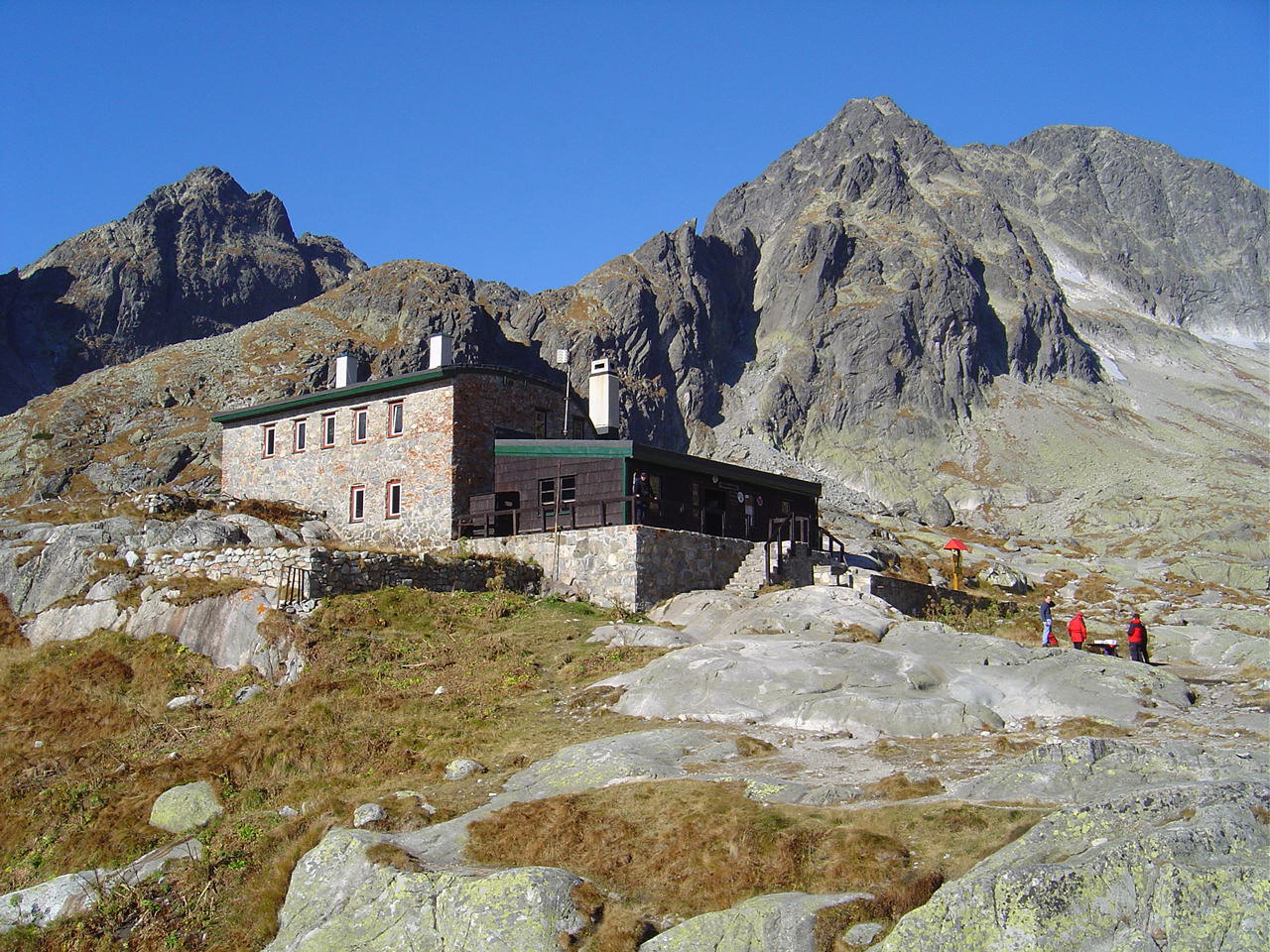
Téryho chata in the Tatra Mountains, Slovakia

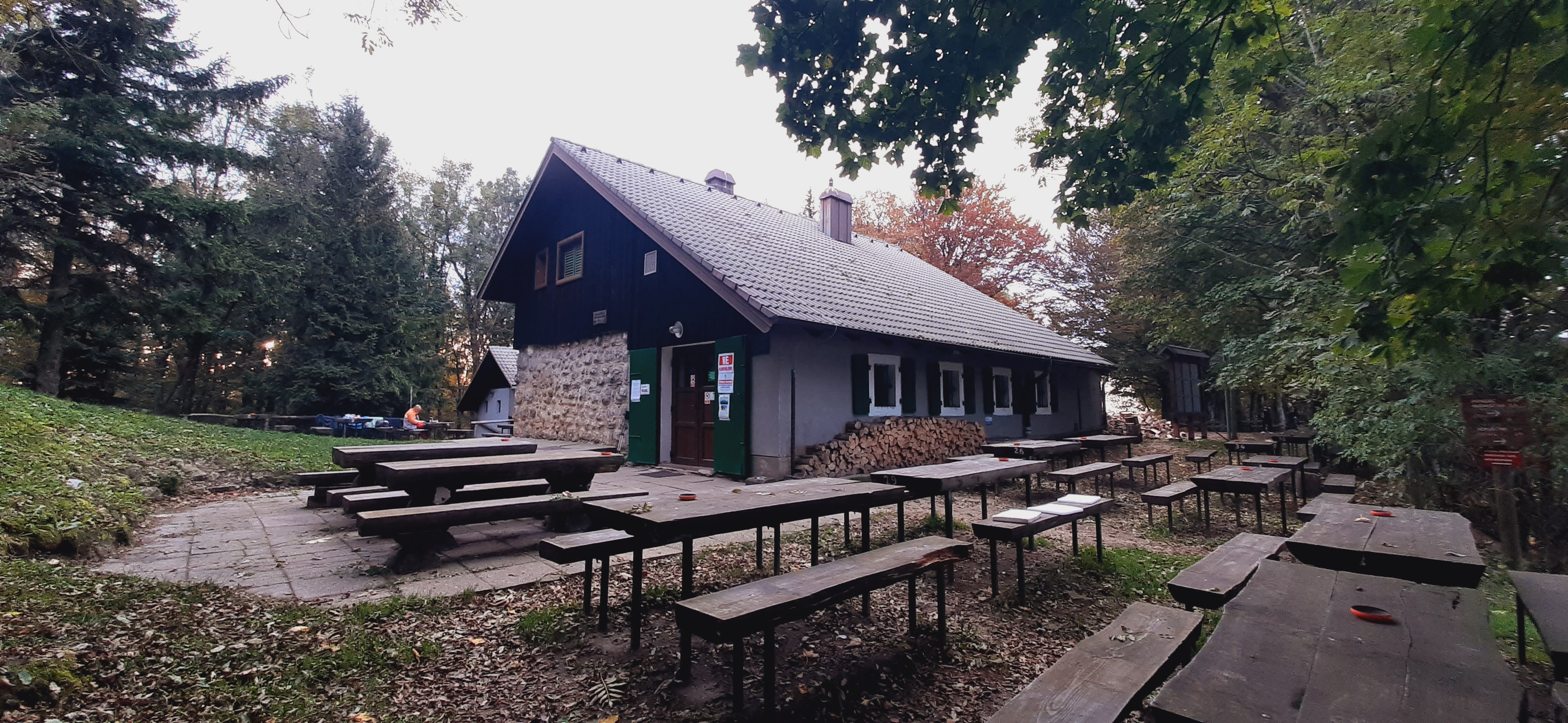
Pasariceva hut on Ivancica mountain in Ivancica, Croatia

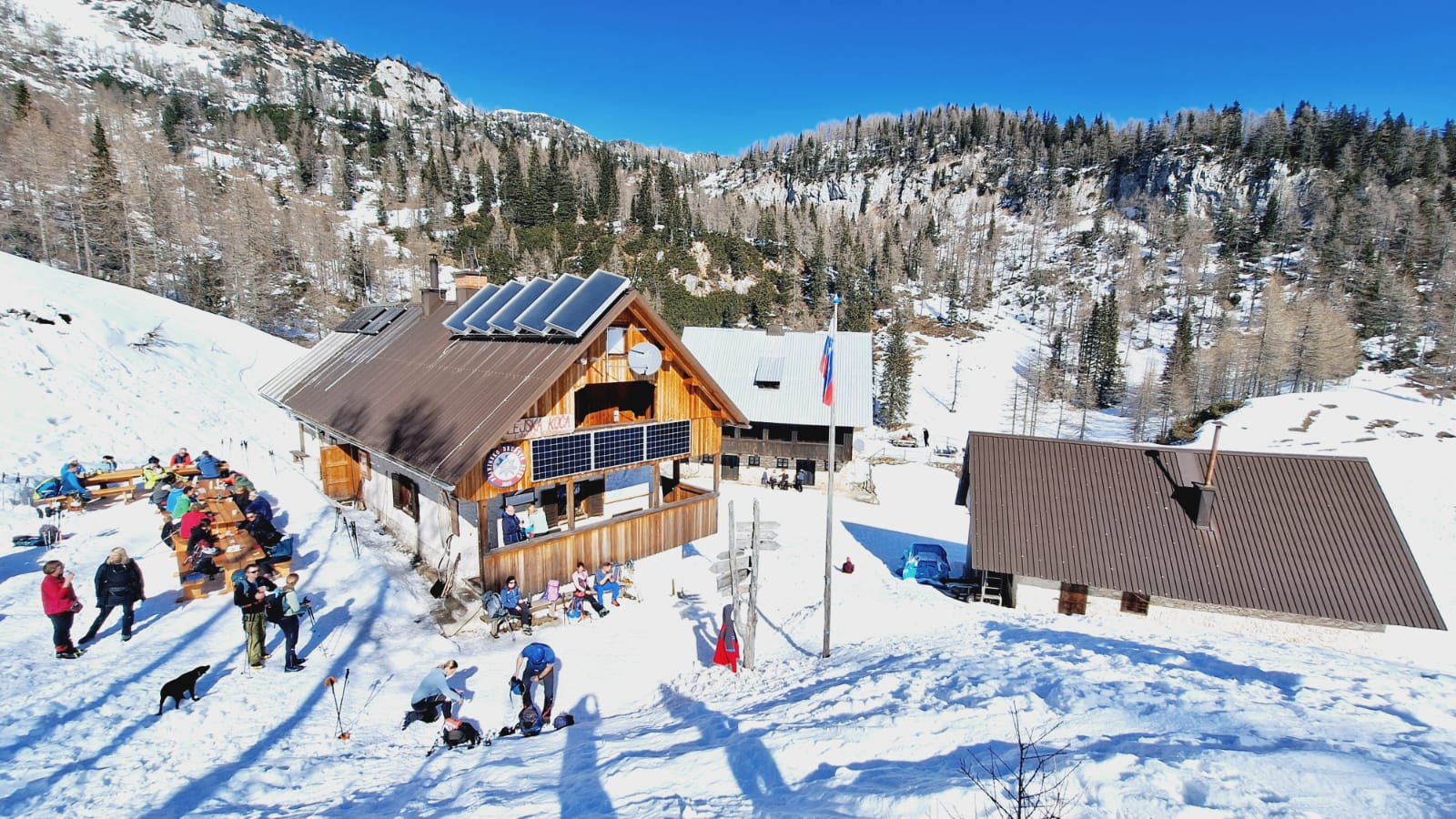
Blejska koca na Lipanci, Julian Alps, Slovenia

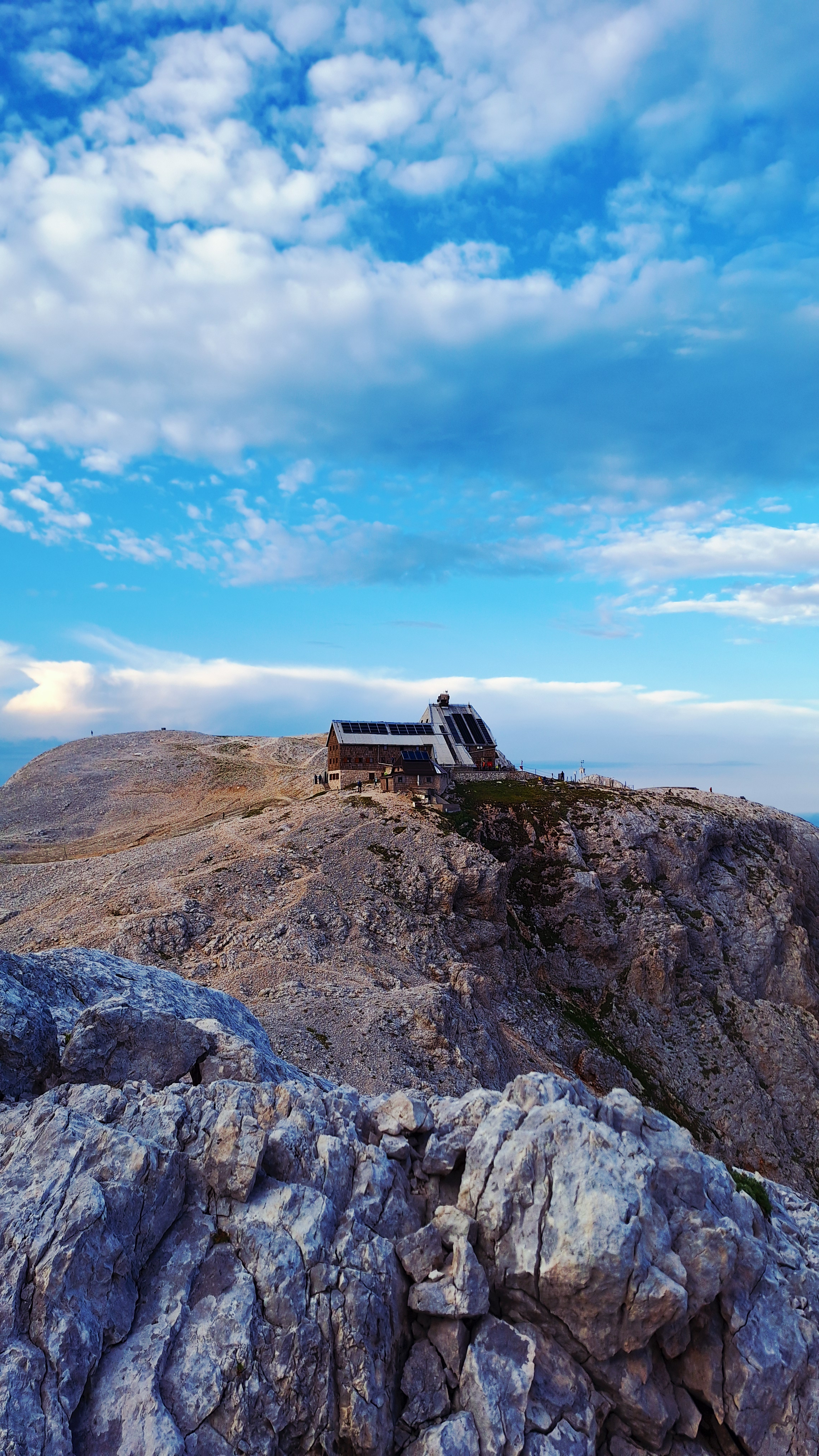
Mountain hut Kredarica, Julian Alps, Slovenia

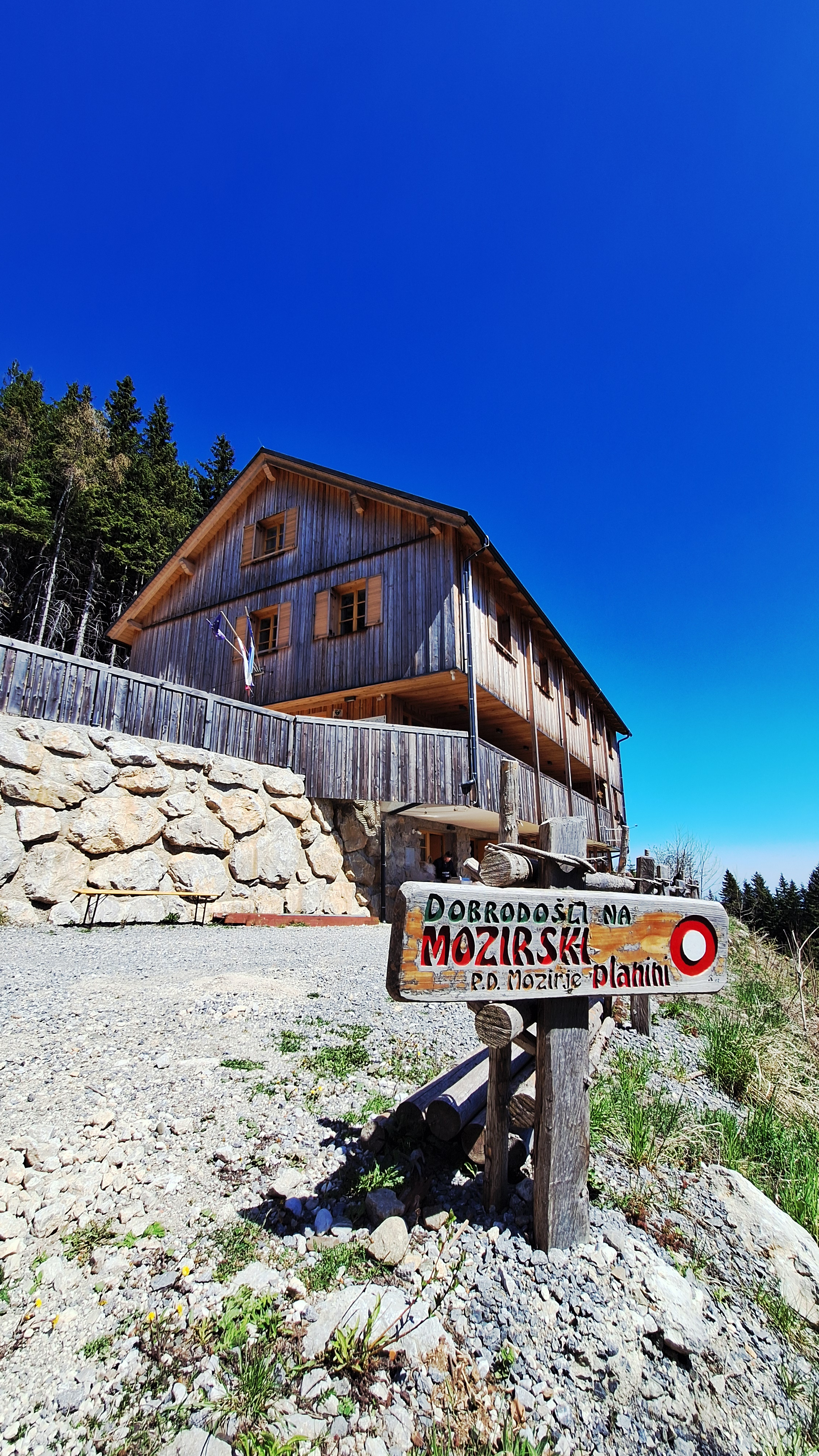
Mozirska koča, Slovenia

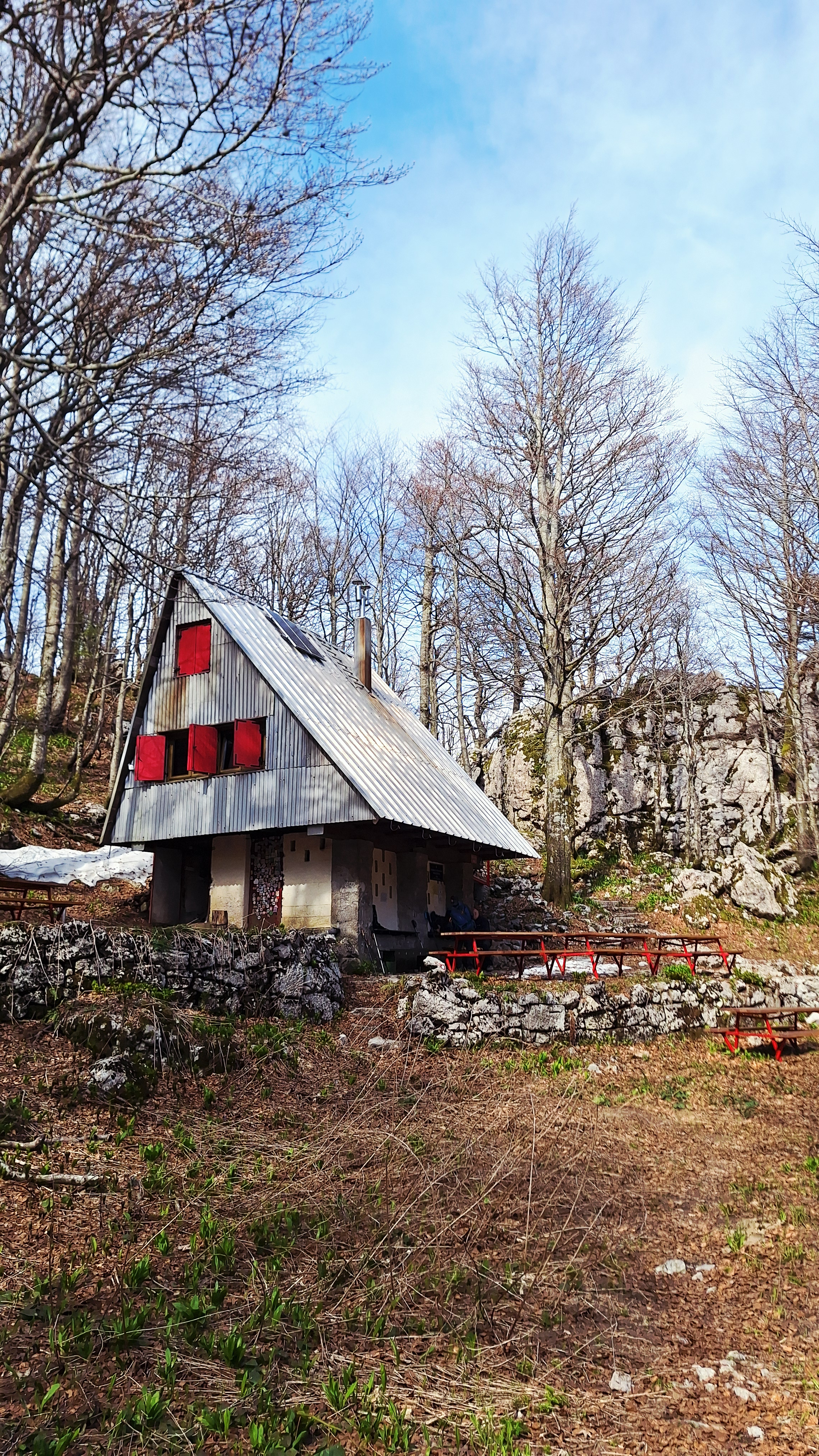
PK Dragutin Hirc, Croatia

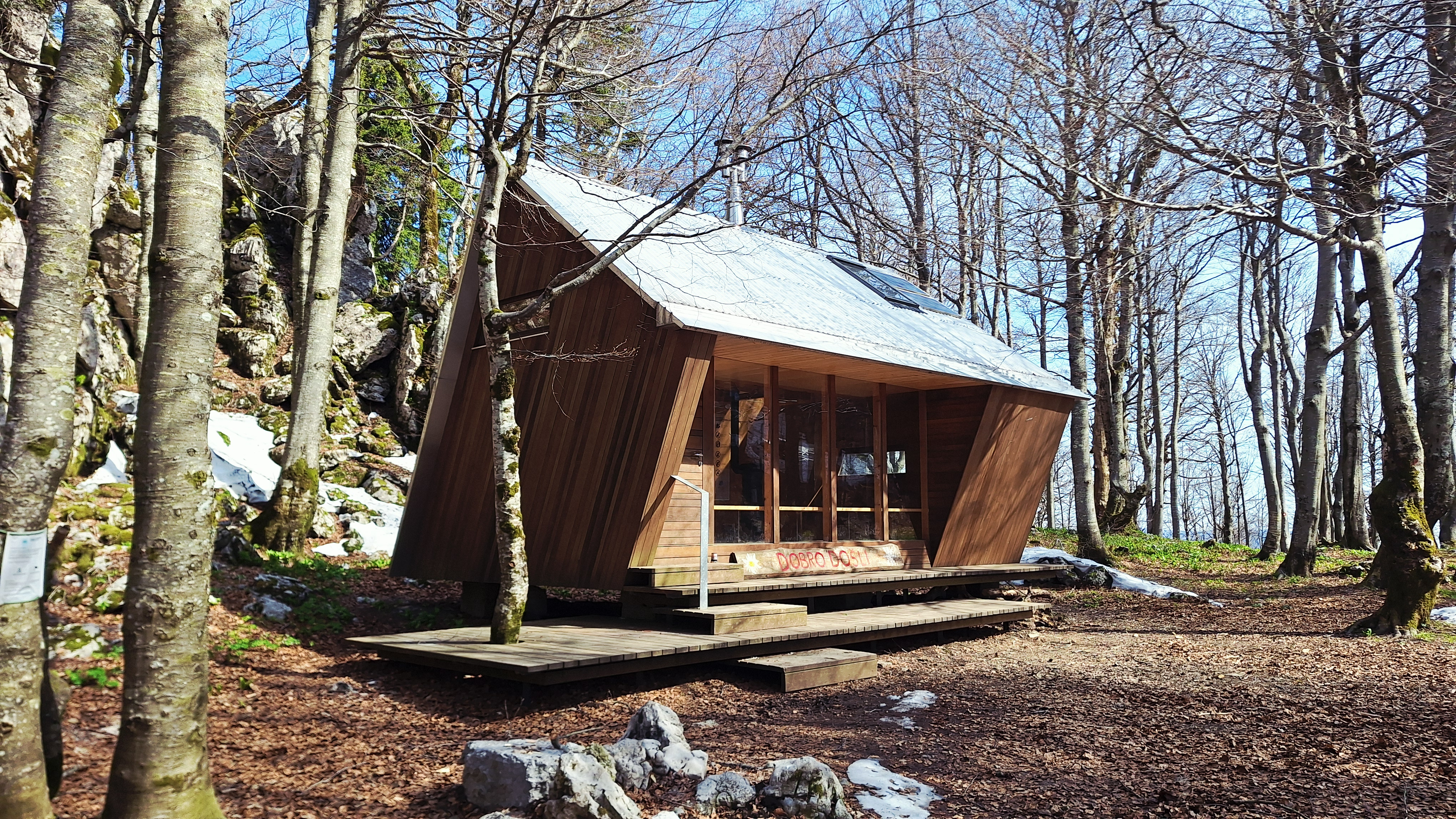
PS Miroslav Hirtz, Croatia

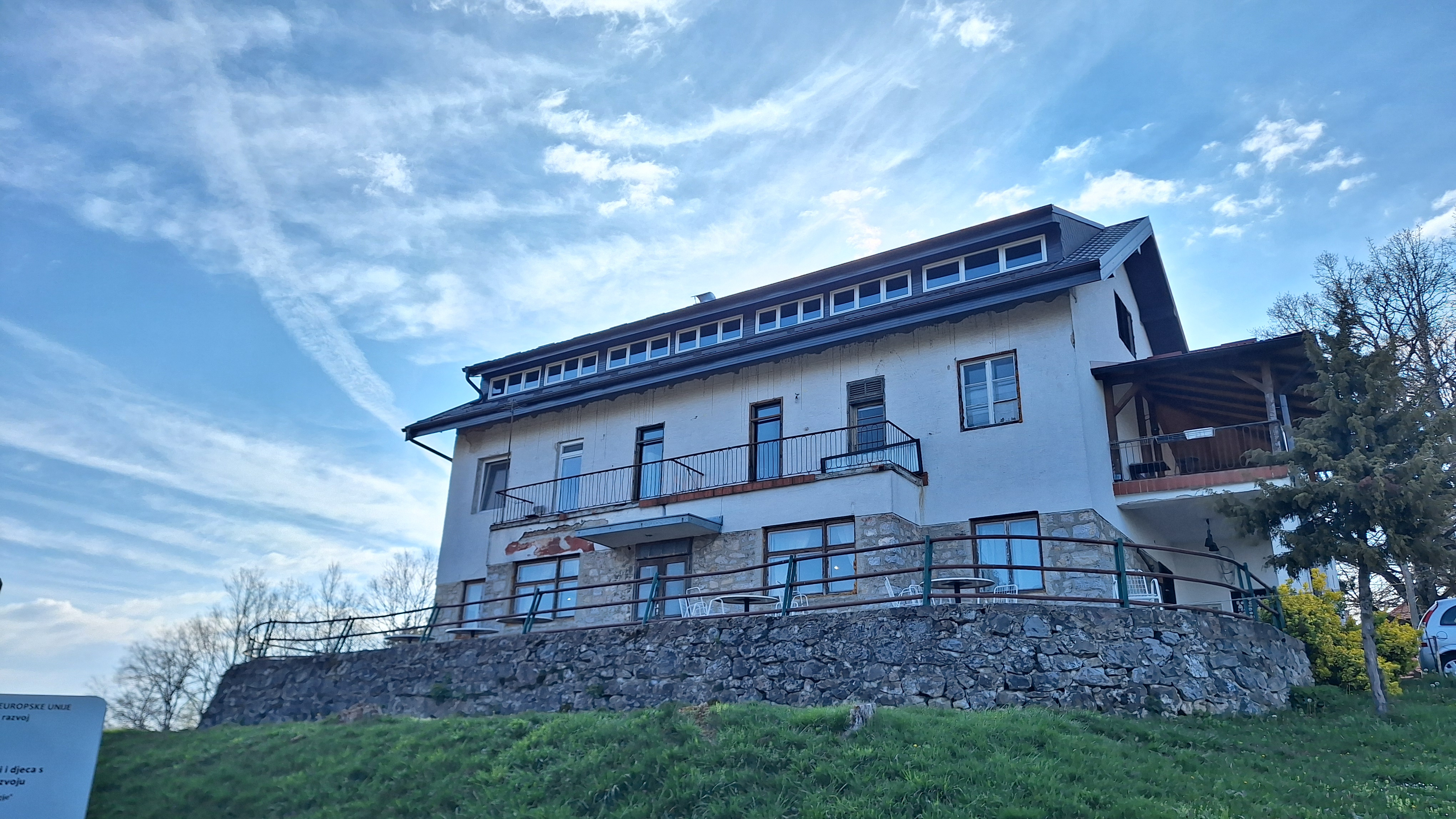
PD Petrov vrh, Croatia

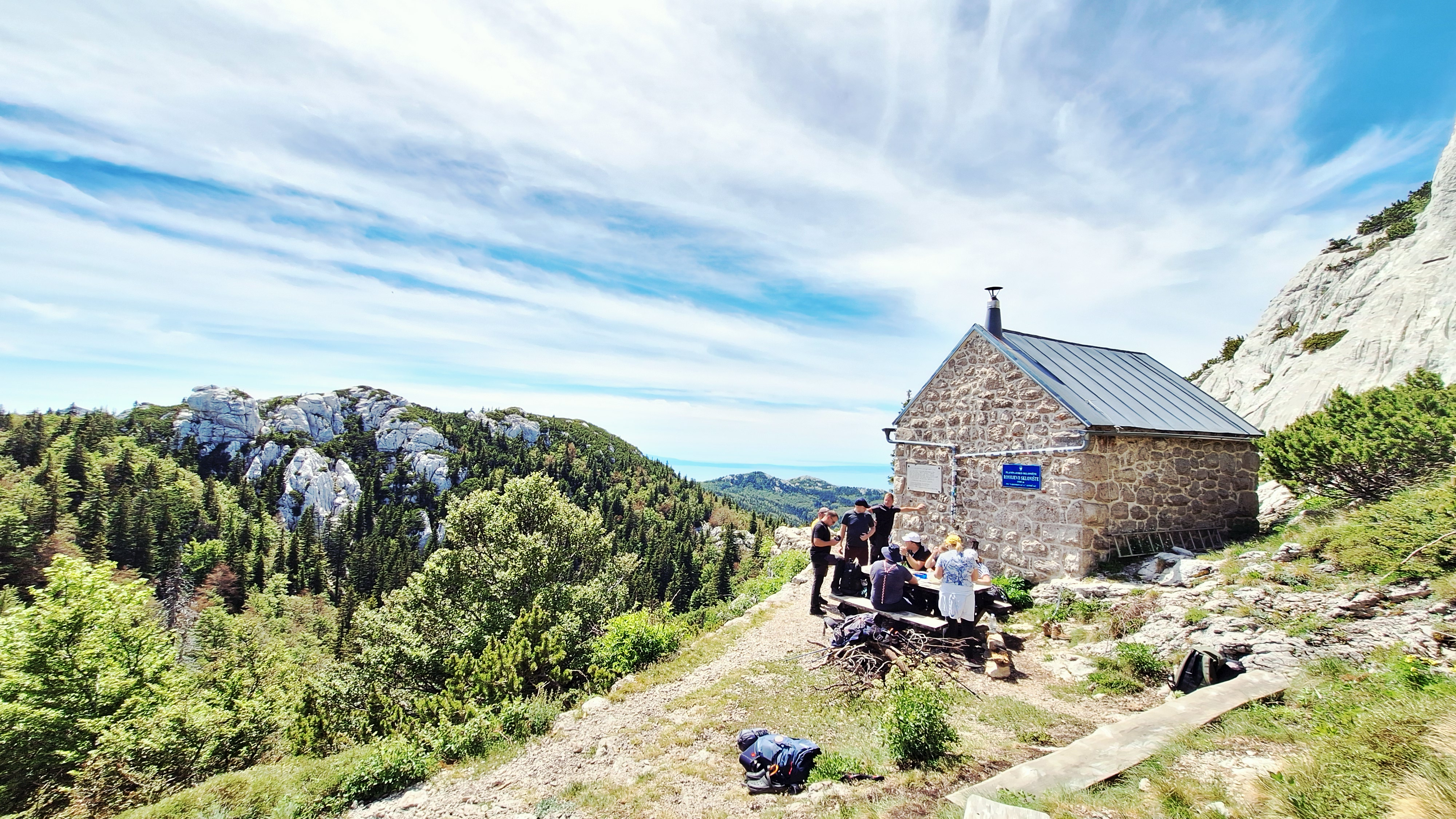
Rossi hut, Croatia

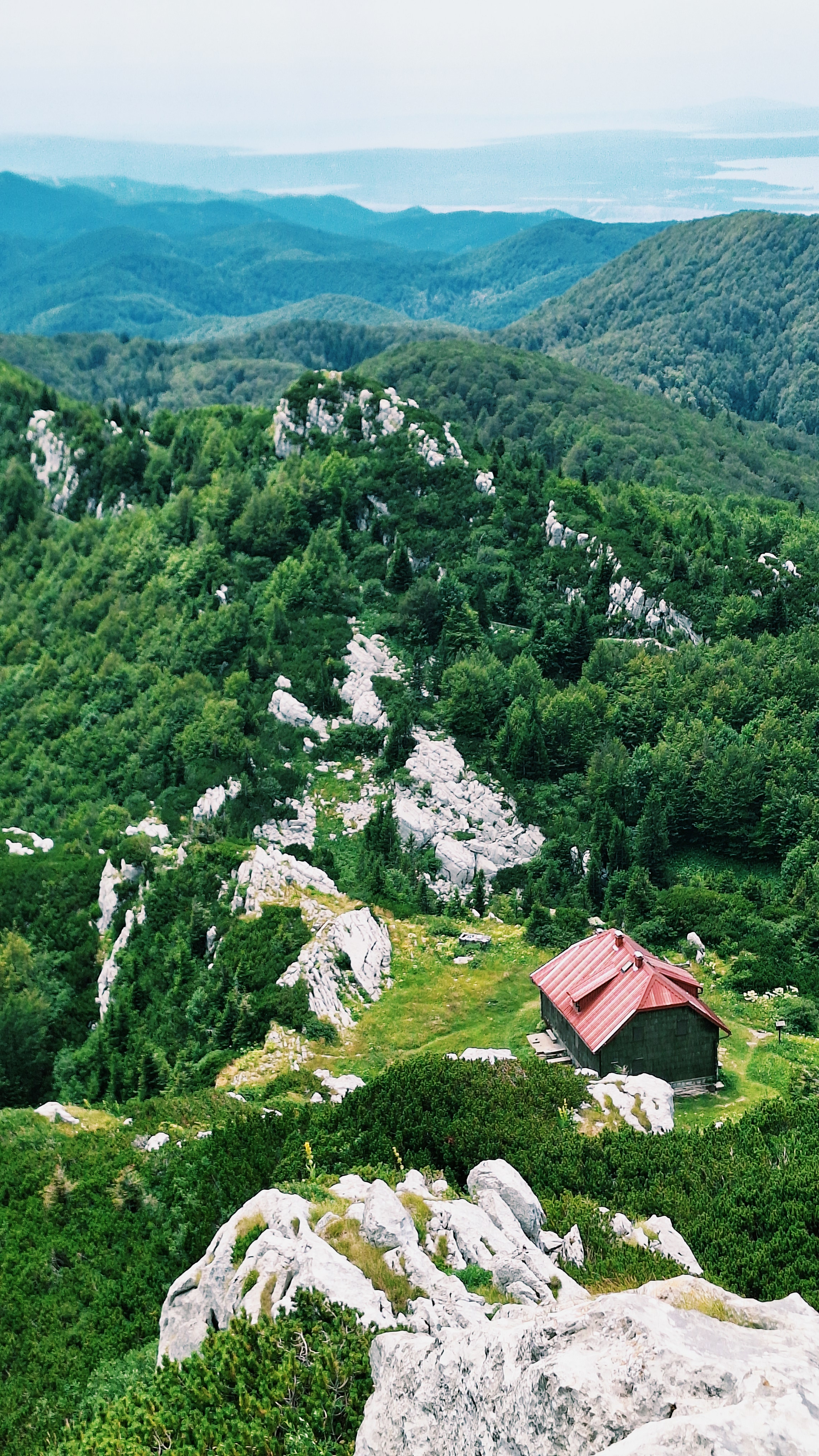
Schlosser hut, Risnjak, Croatia

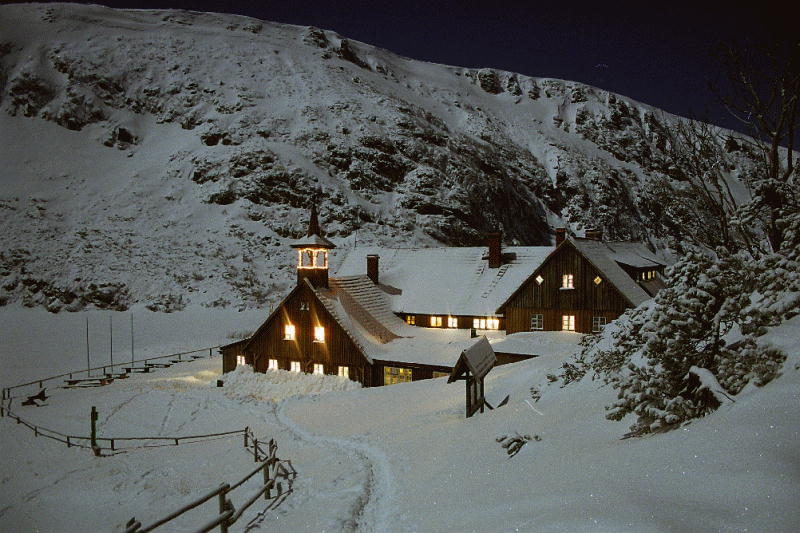
Samotnia in the Karkonosze, Poland

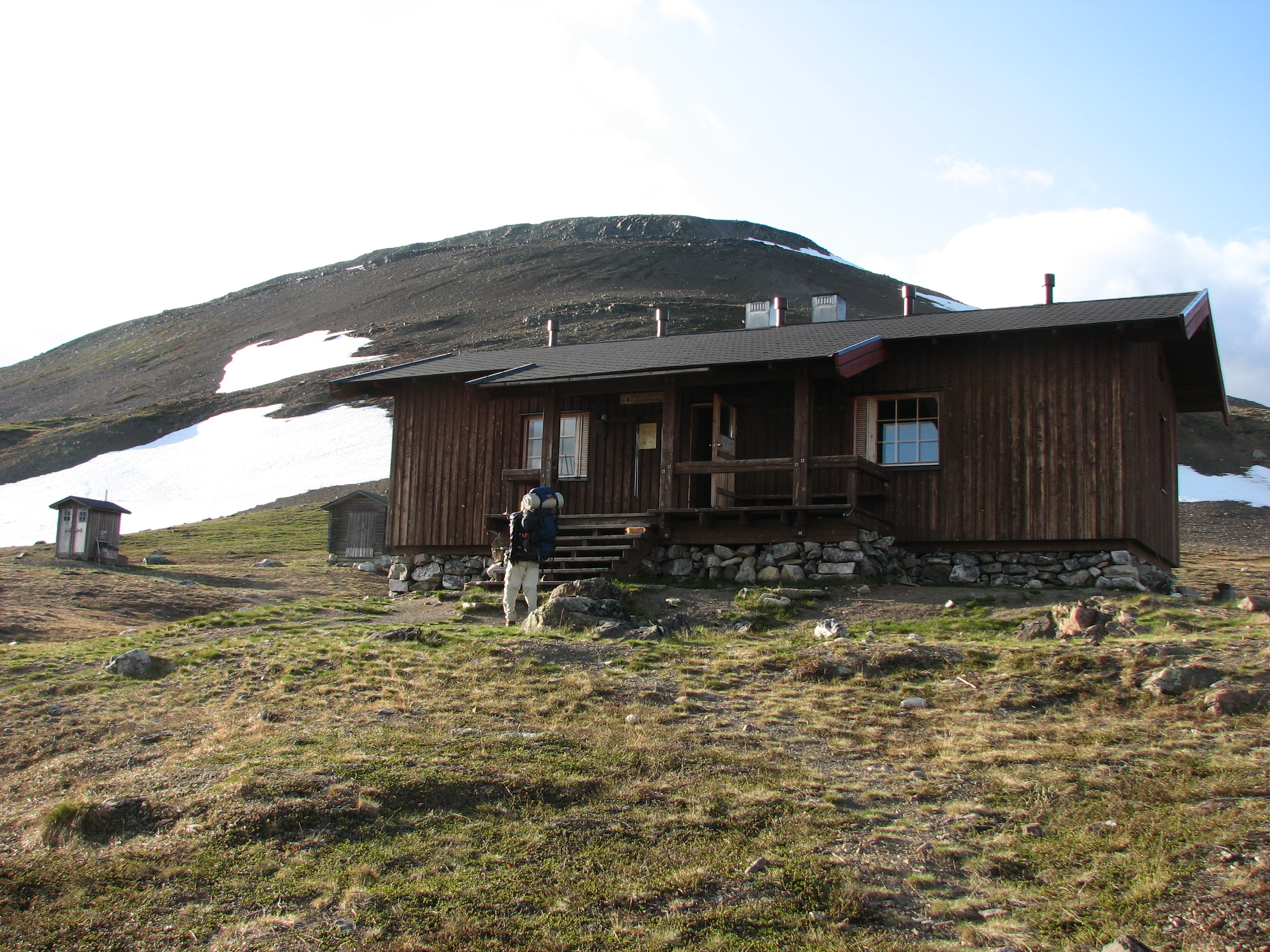
Kuonjarjoki Wilderness Hut in Enontekiö, Finland

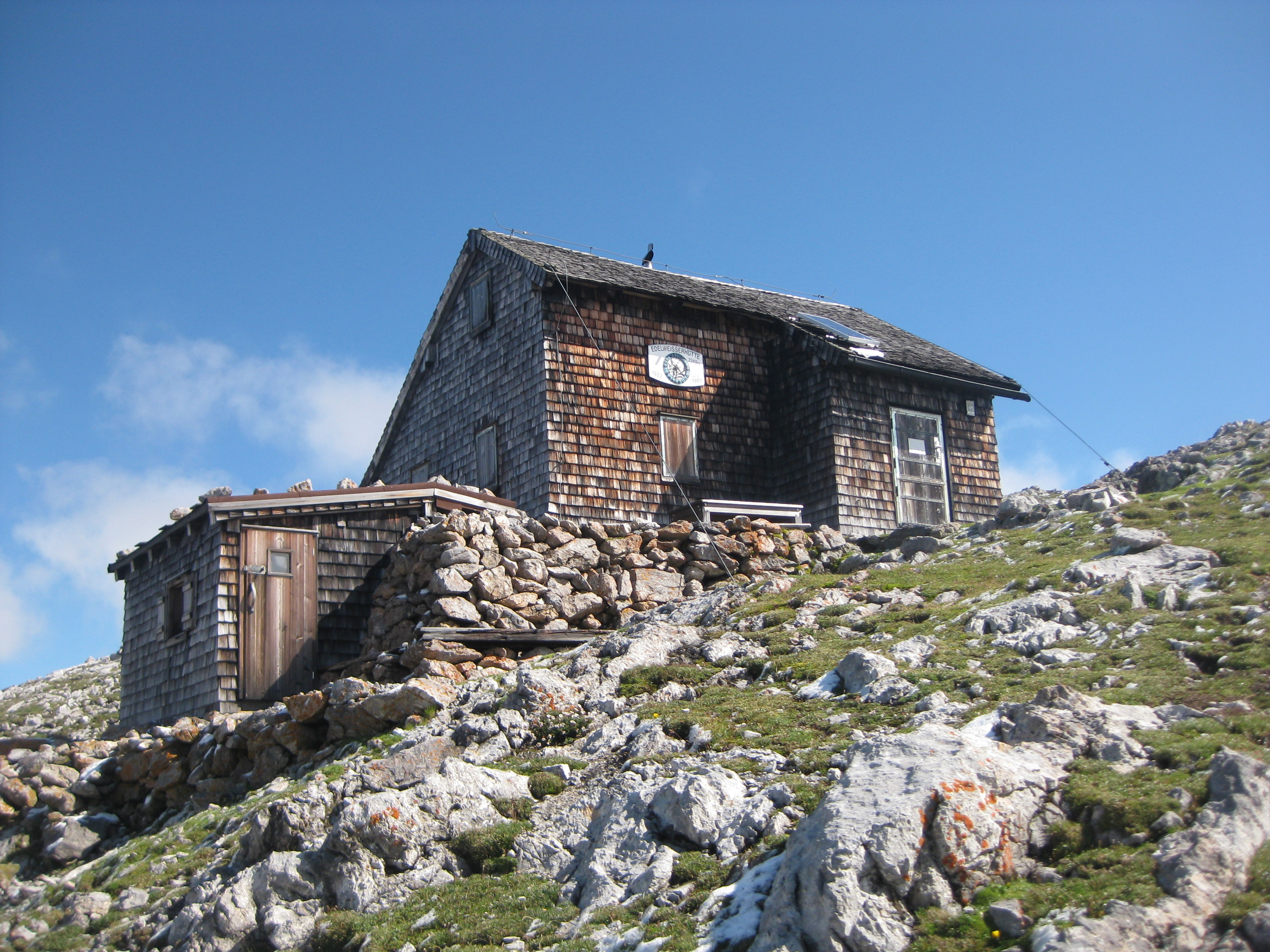
Edelweißerhütte in the Tennen Mountains, Austria

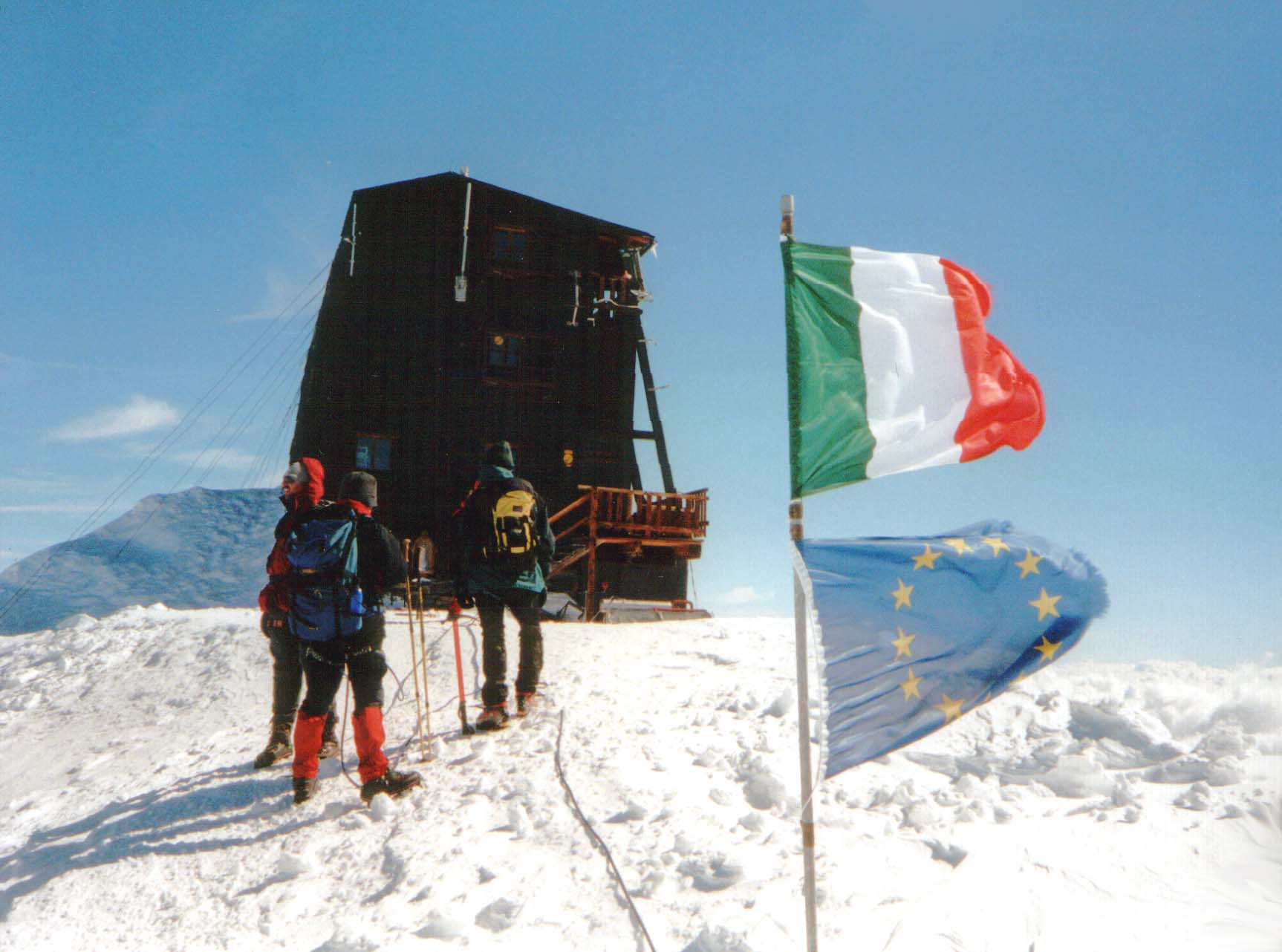
The Margherita Hut, the highest refuge in the Alps

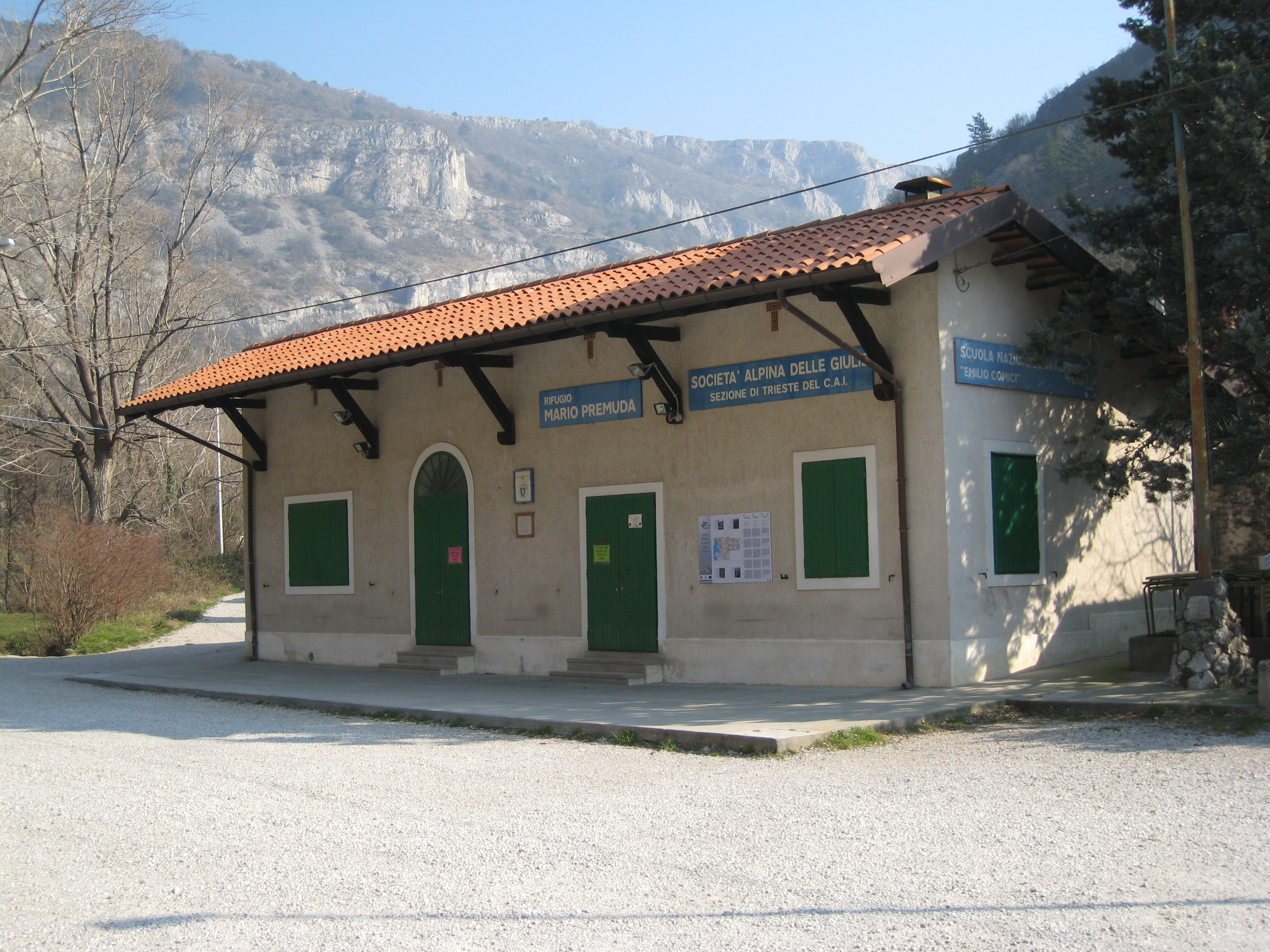
The Rifugio Mario Premuda in Trieste, the lowest refuge in the Alps

=== Latin America ===
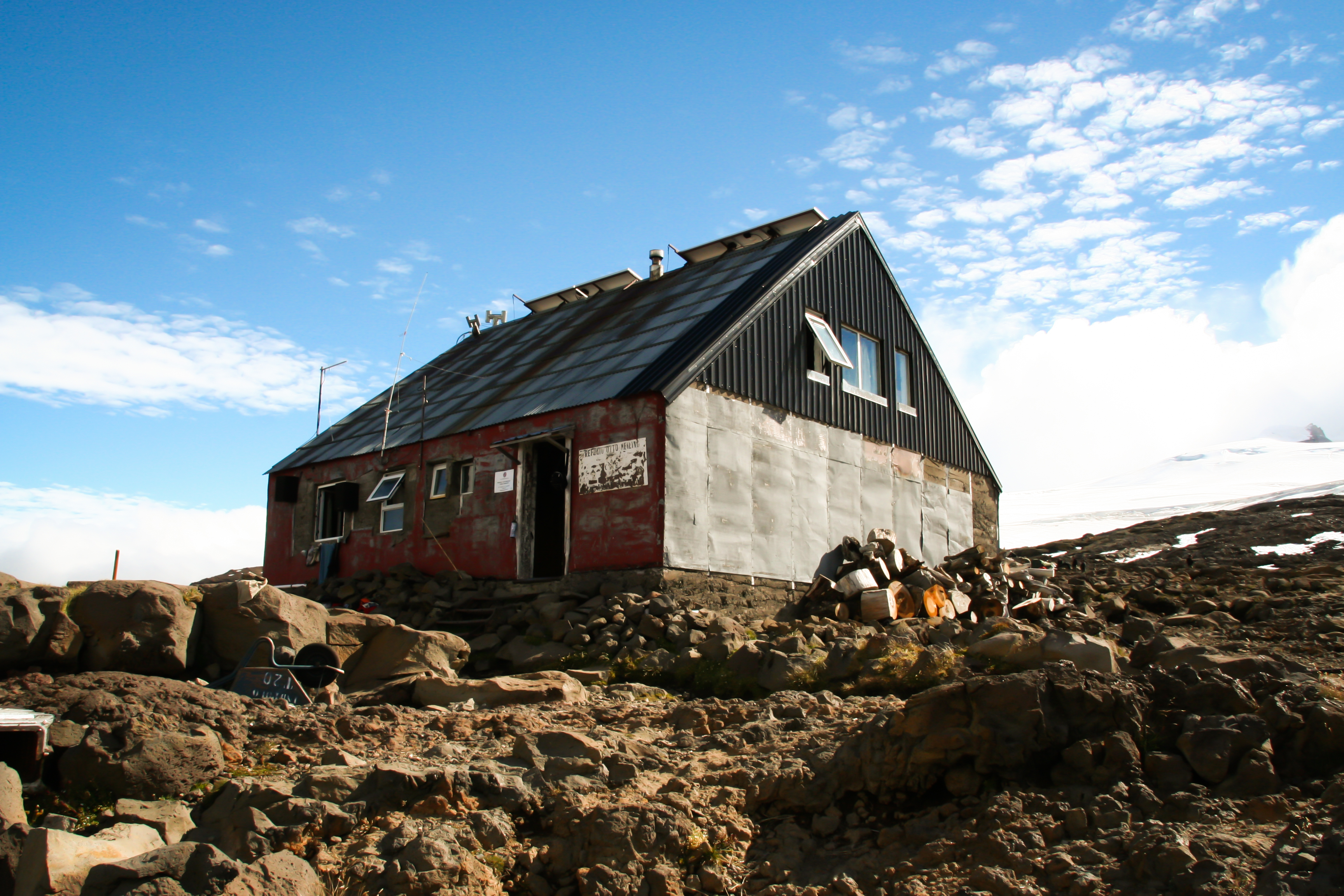
A refugio atop Tronador, Argentina

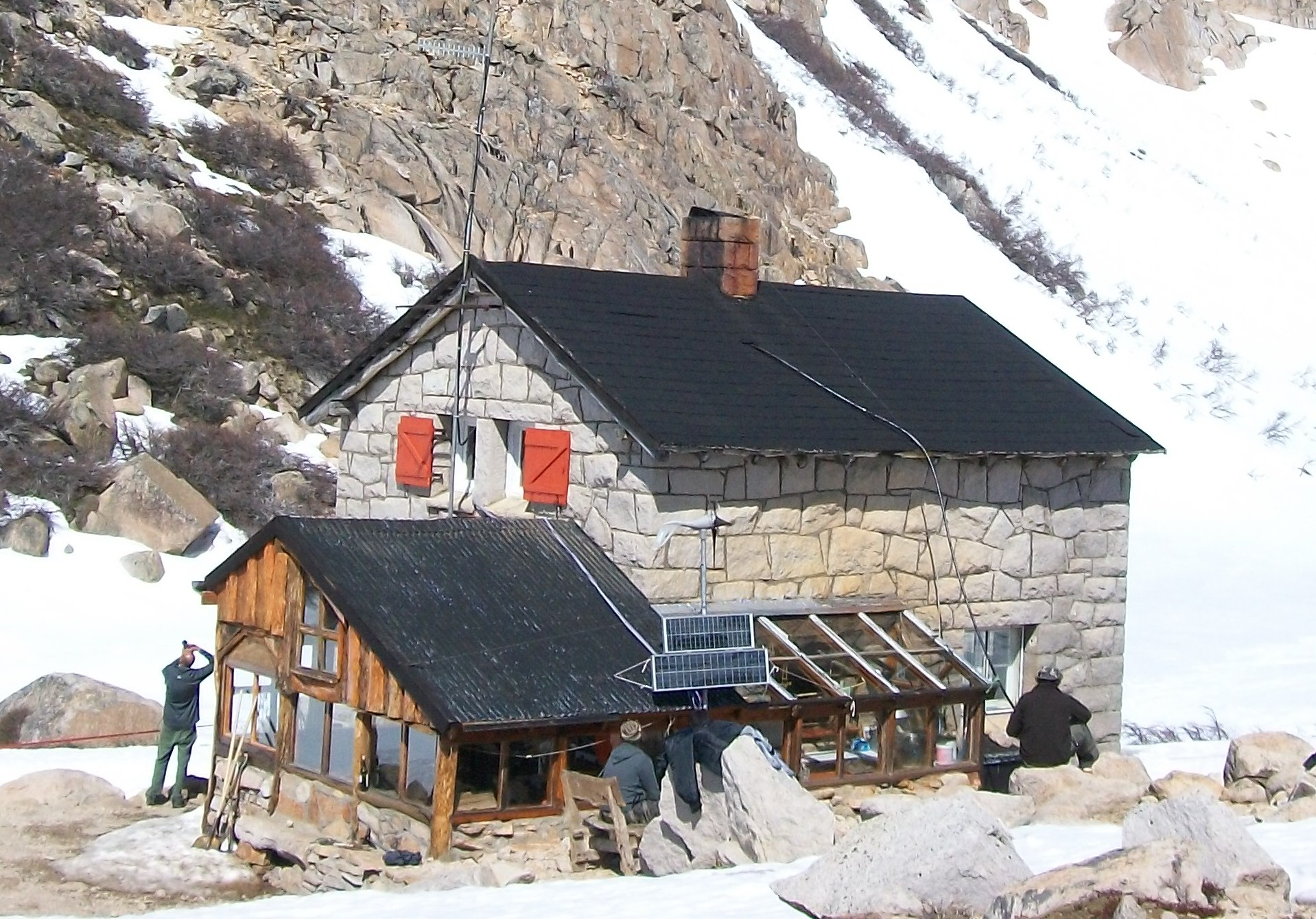
Frey Hut in San Carlos de Bariloche, Argentina

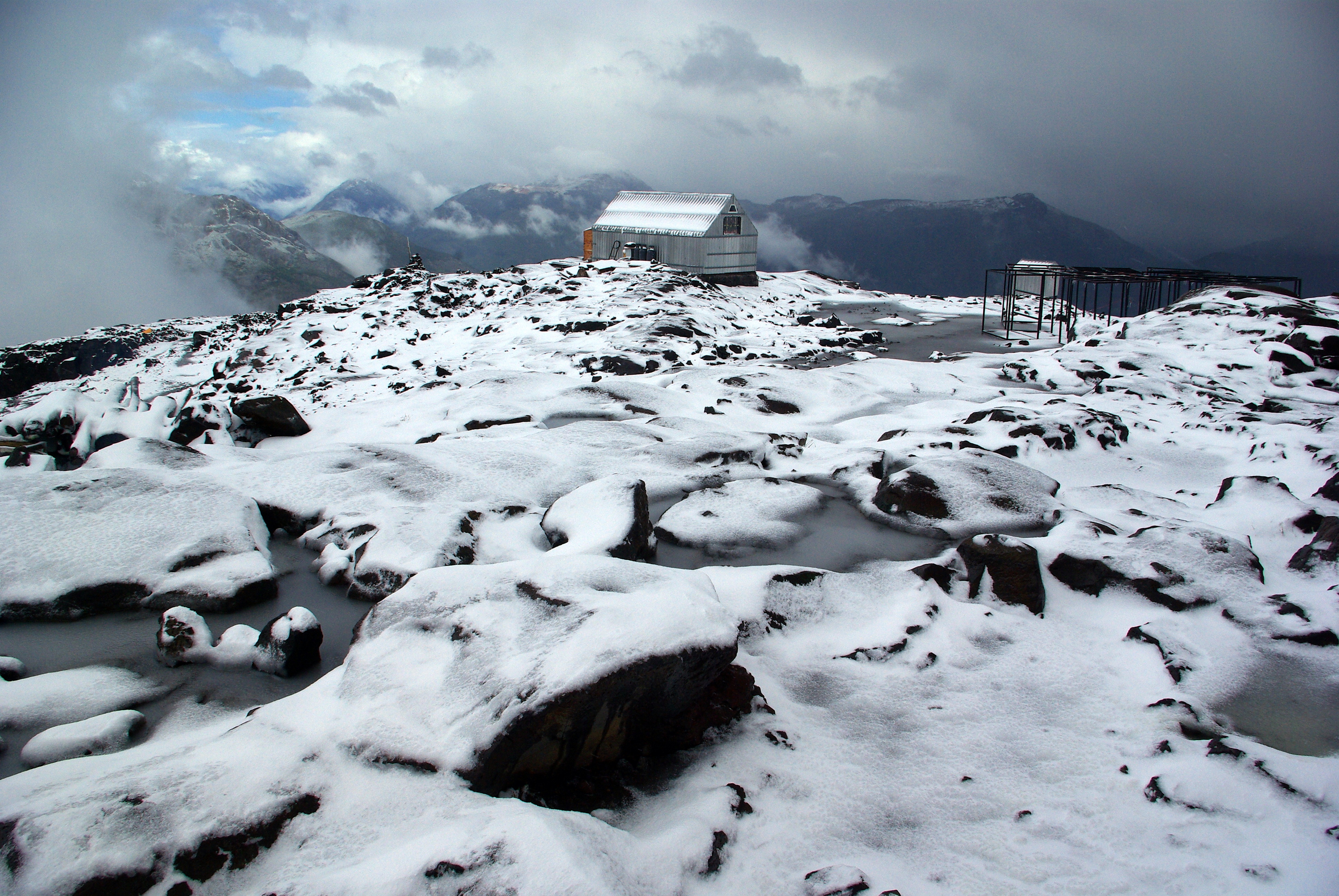
Refugio Otto Meiling Stevage, Argentina

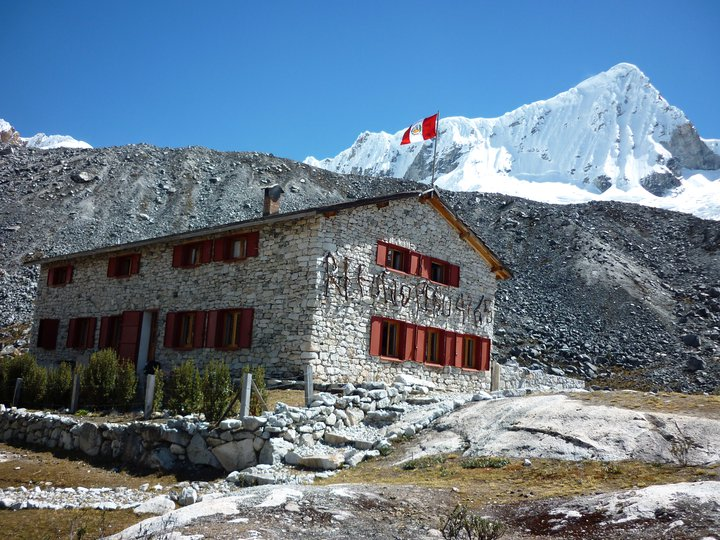
Refugio Perú in Ancash, Peru

=== North America ===
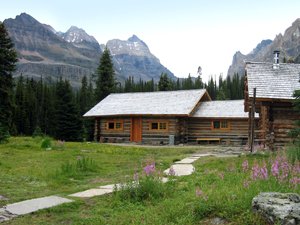
Elizabeth Parker hut in British Columbia in the Canadian Rockies

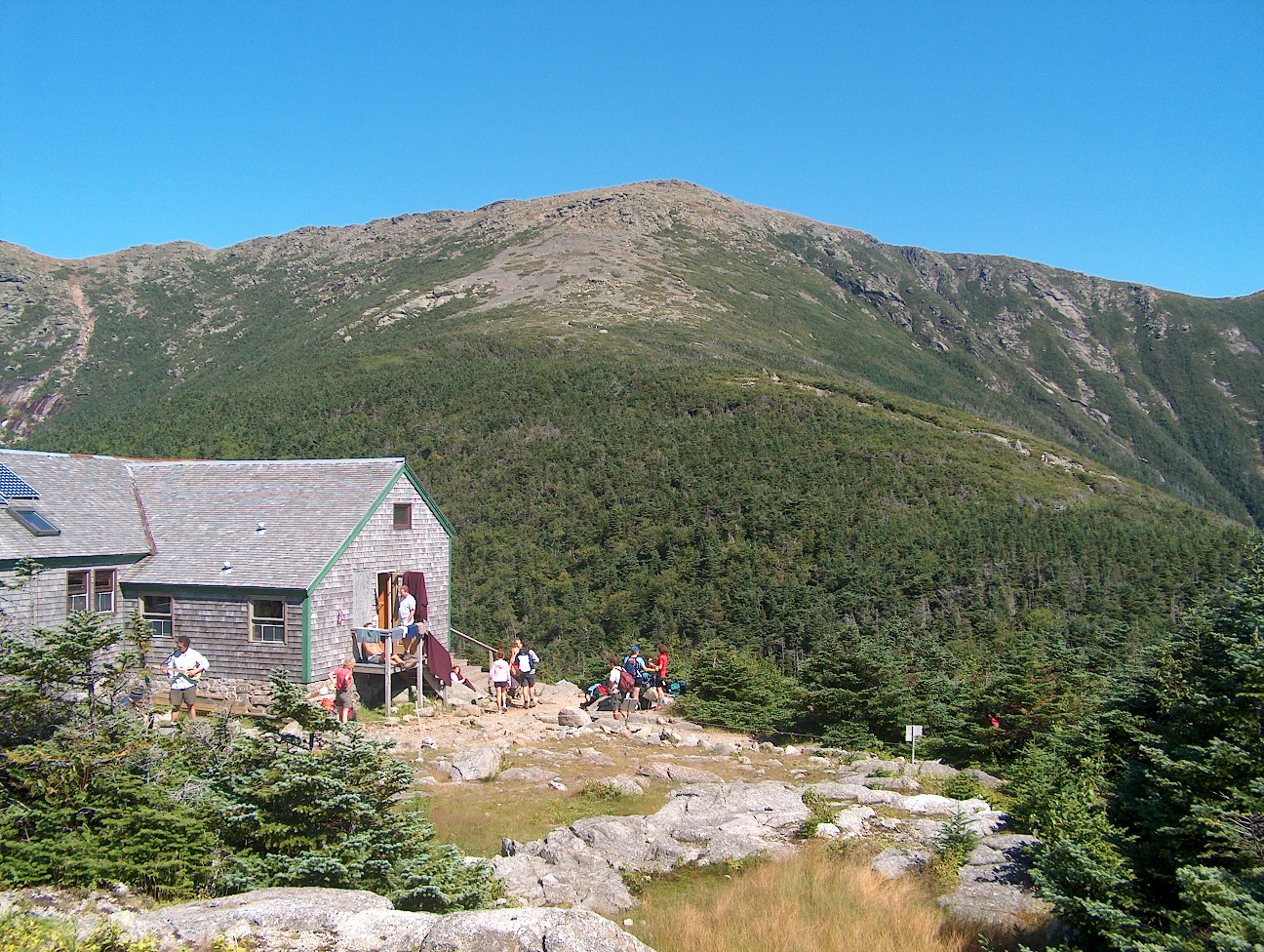
Greenleaf Hut in the White Mountains of the U.S.

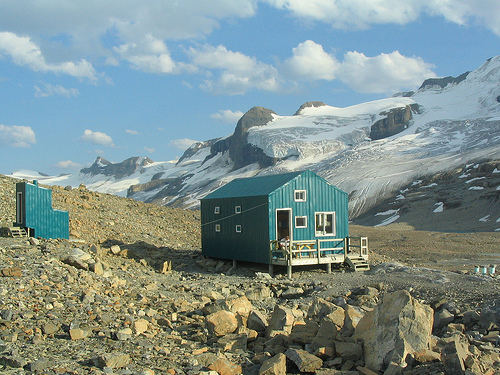
R. J. Ritchie Hut (Balfour Hut) in Banff National Park

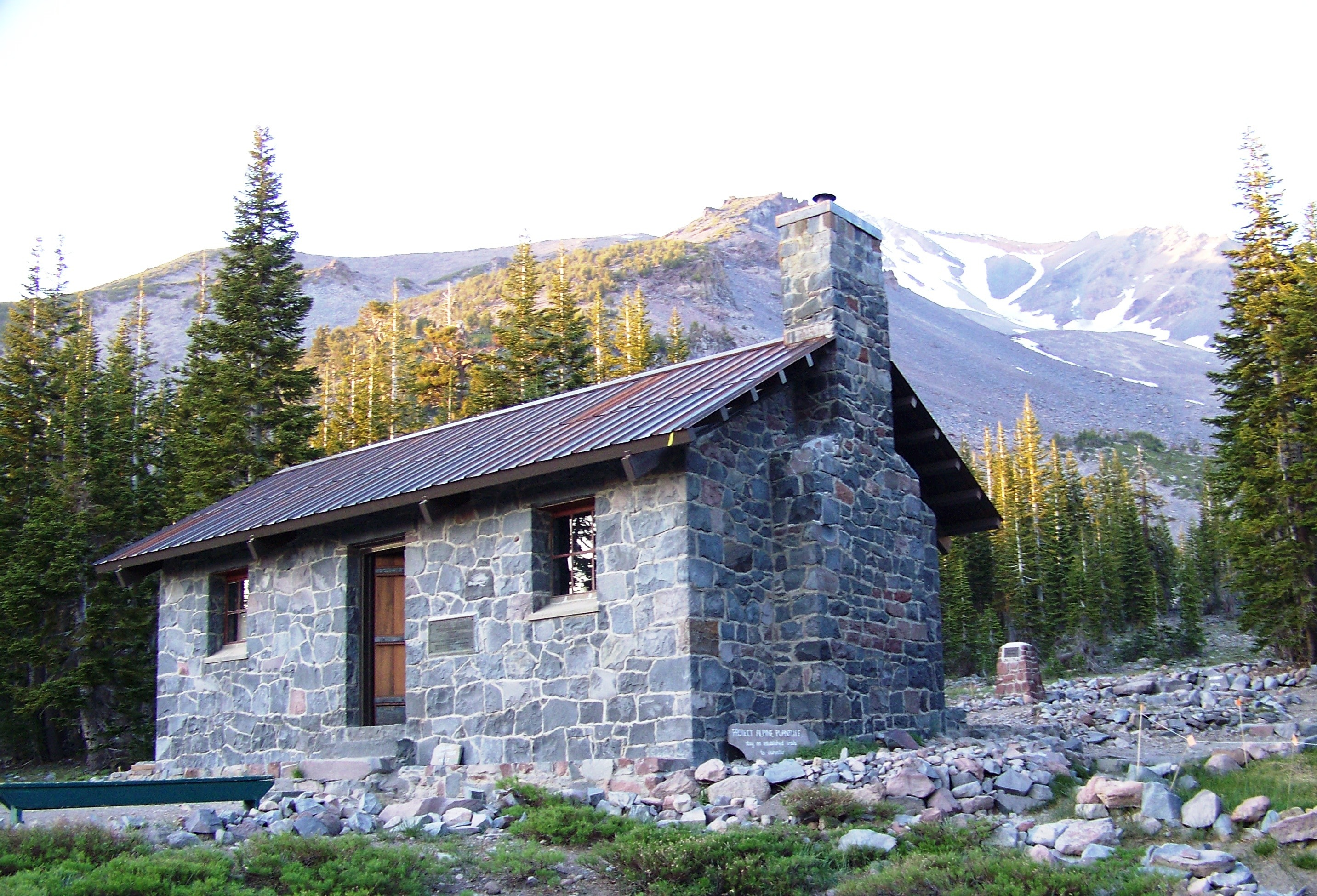
Shasta Alpine Lodge at Horse Camp on Mount Shasta, California

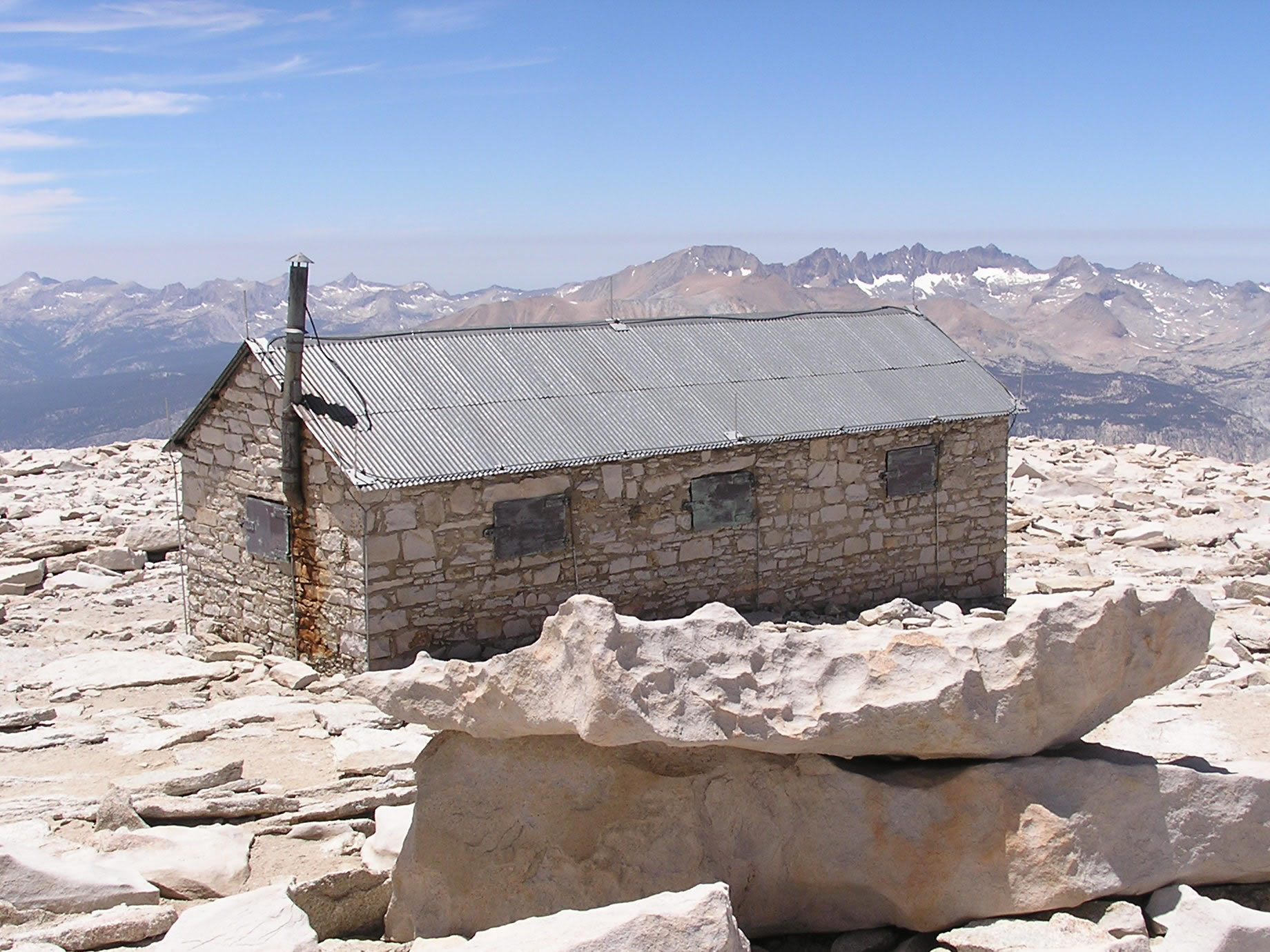
Smithsonian Institution Shelter on the summit of Mount Whitney, California

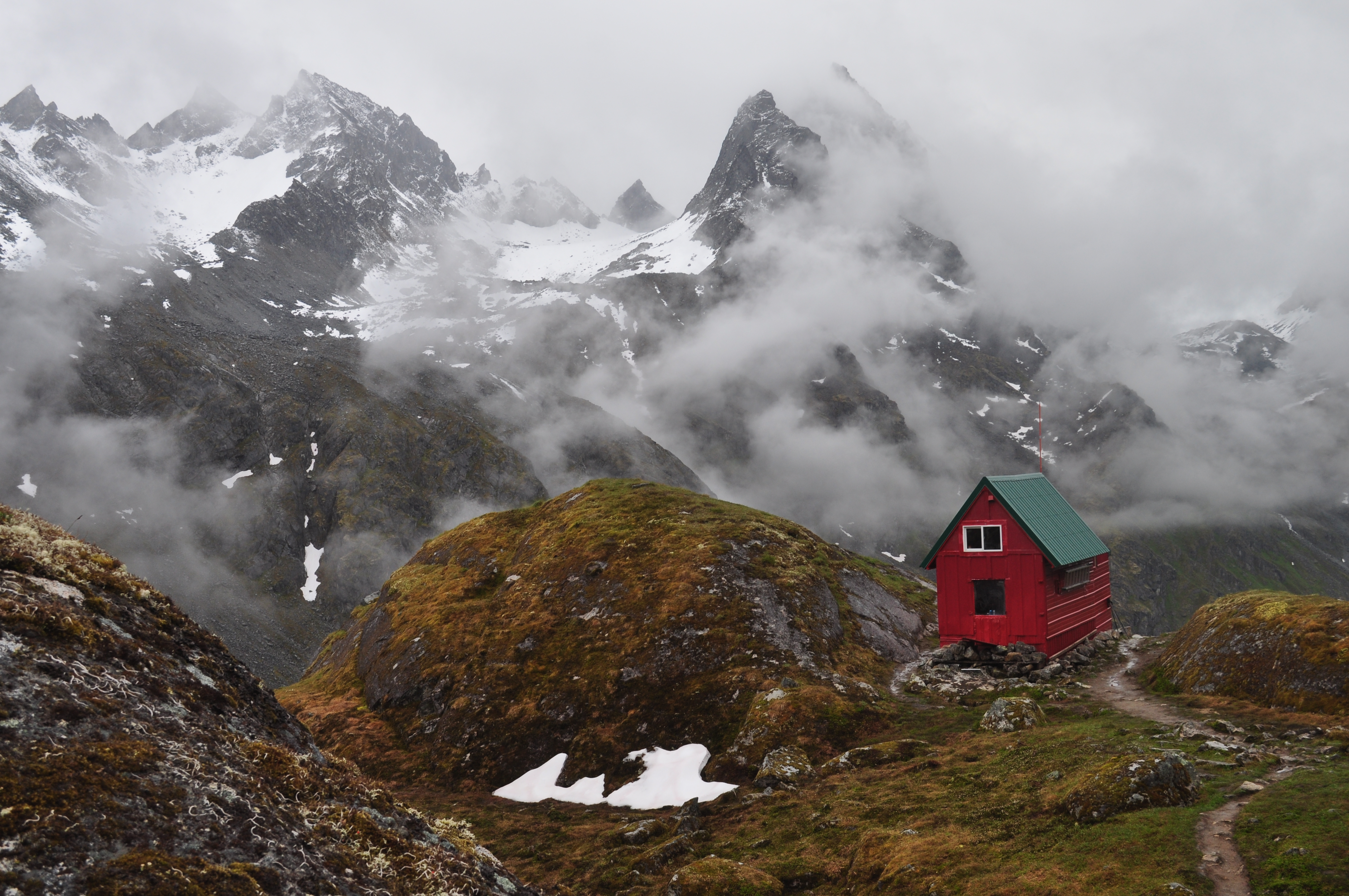
Mint Glacier Hut in the Talkeetna Mountains, Alaska

=== Africa ===
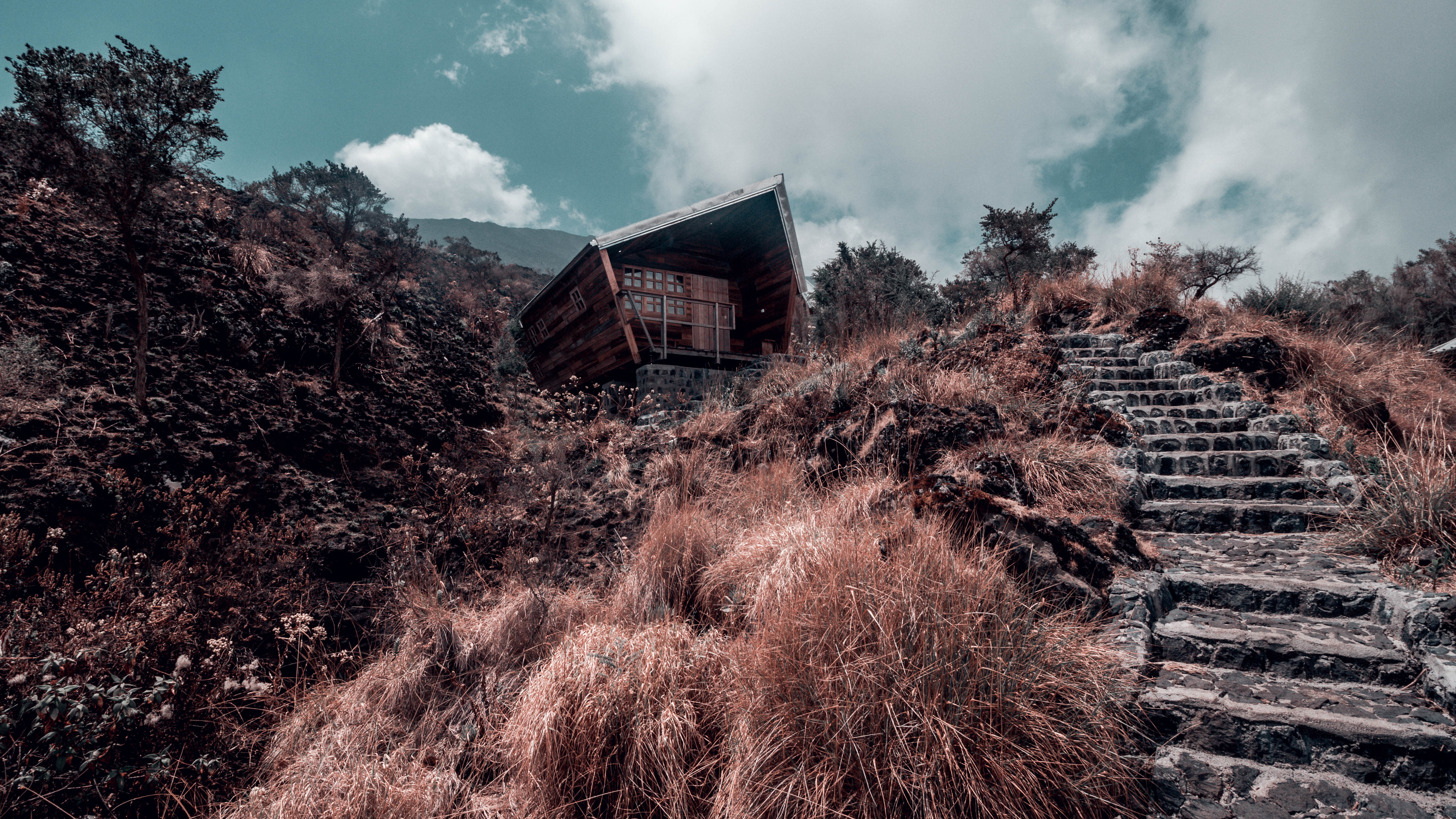
Mountain cabin on Mount Cameroon

=== Oceania, Australia, New Zealand ===
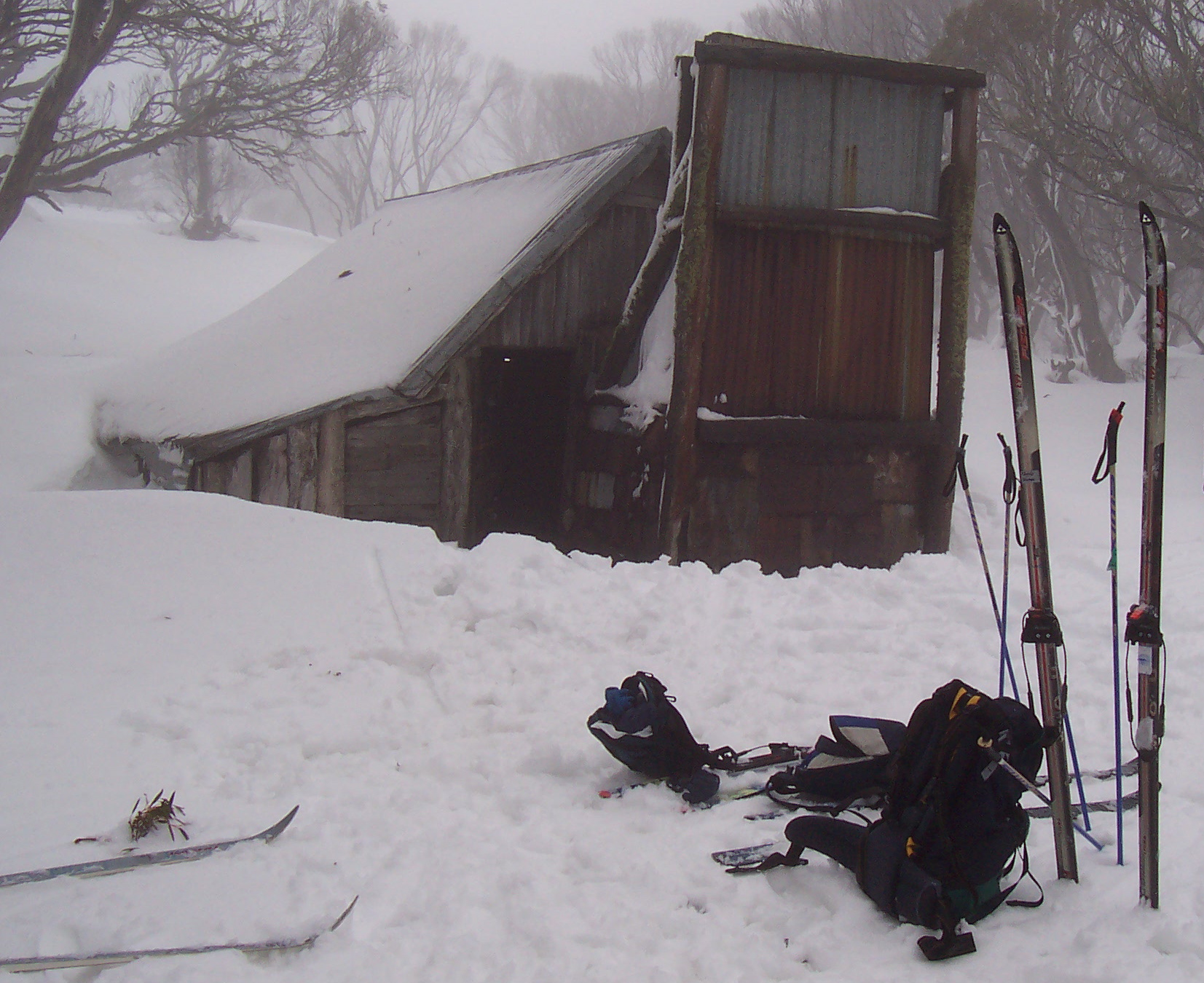
Wallace's Hut, Bogong High Plains

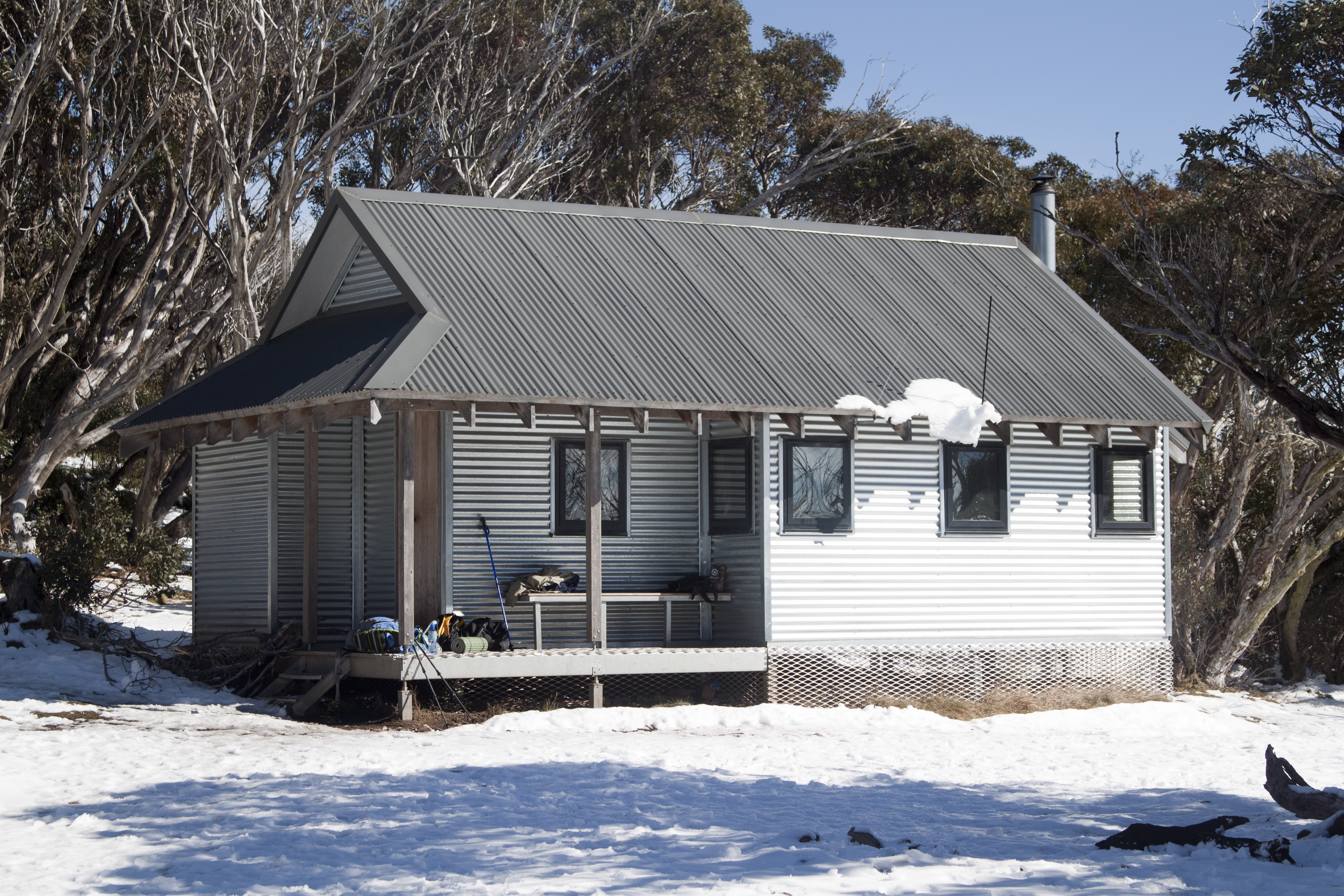
Federation Hut, Mount Feathertop

=== Asia ===
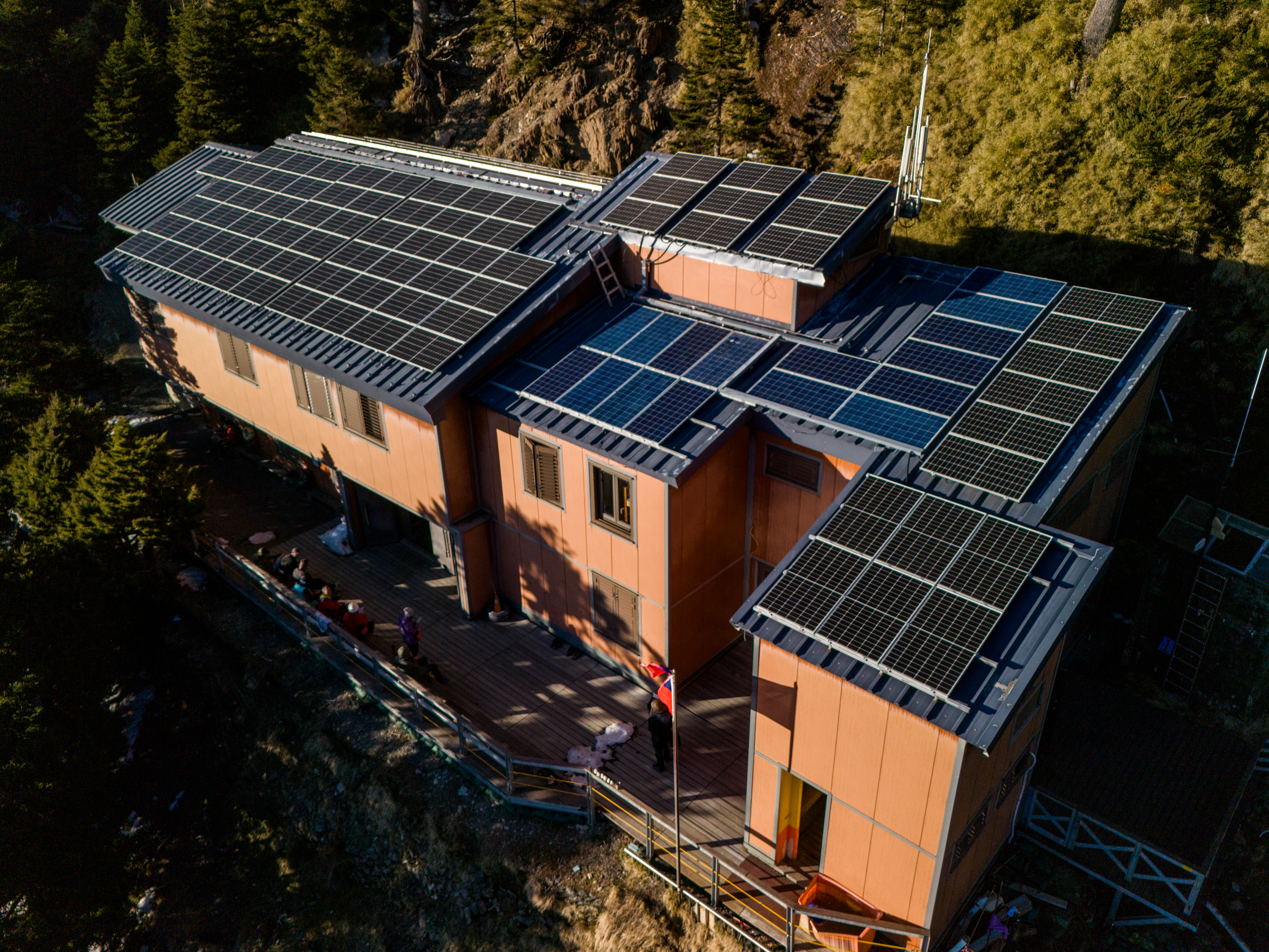
Paiyun Lodge in Yushan (Mt. Jade), Taiwan

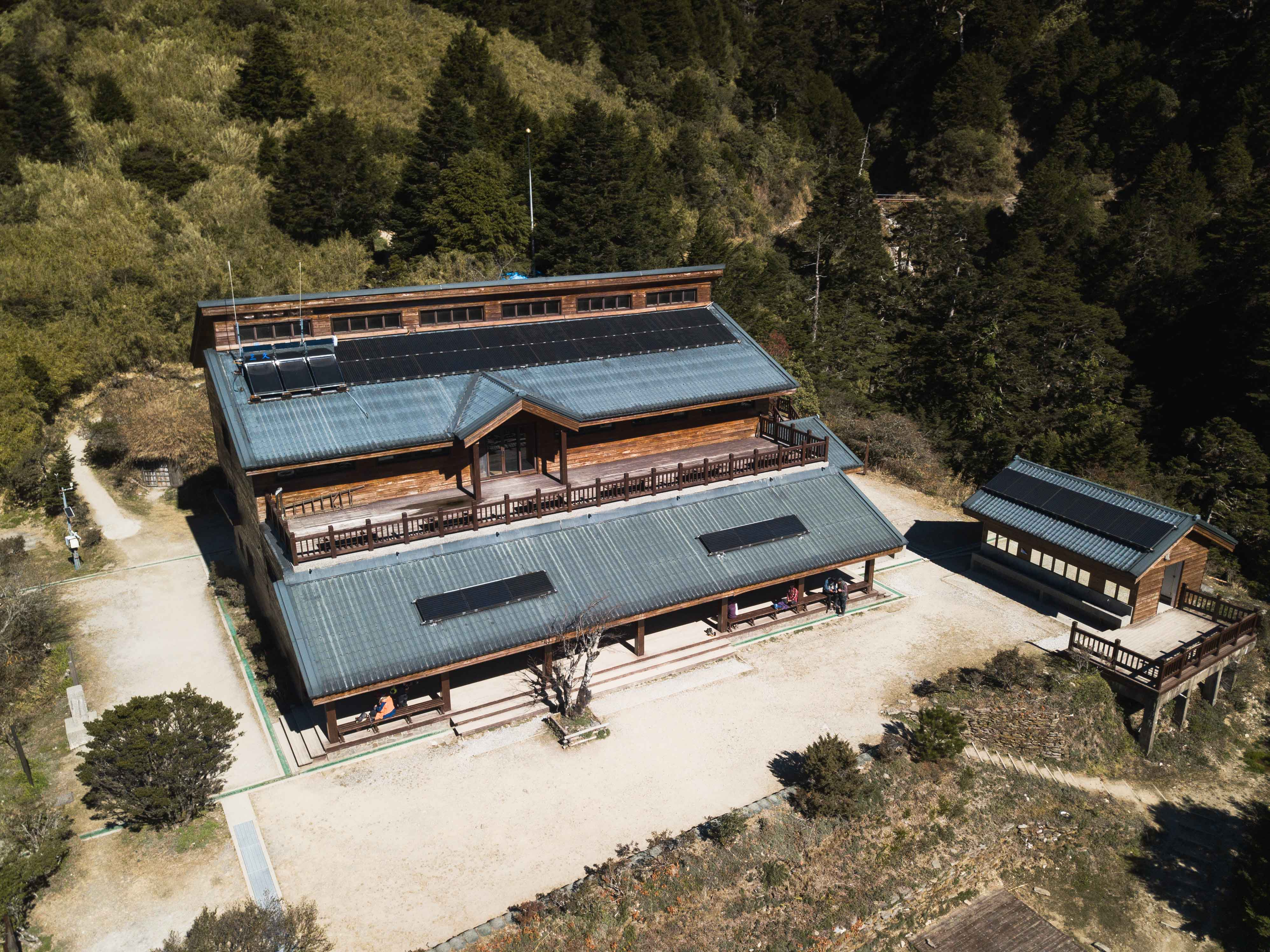
Tianchi Lodge on the west side of the North Peak of Mount Nenggao, Taiwan

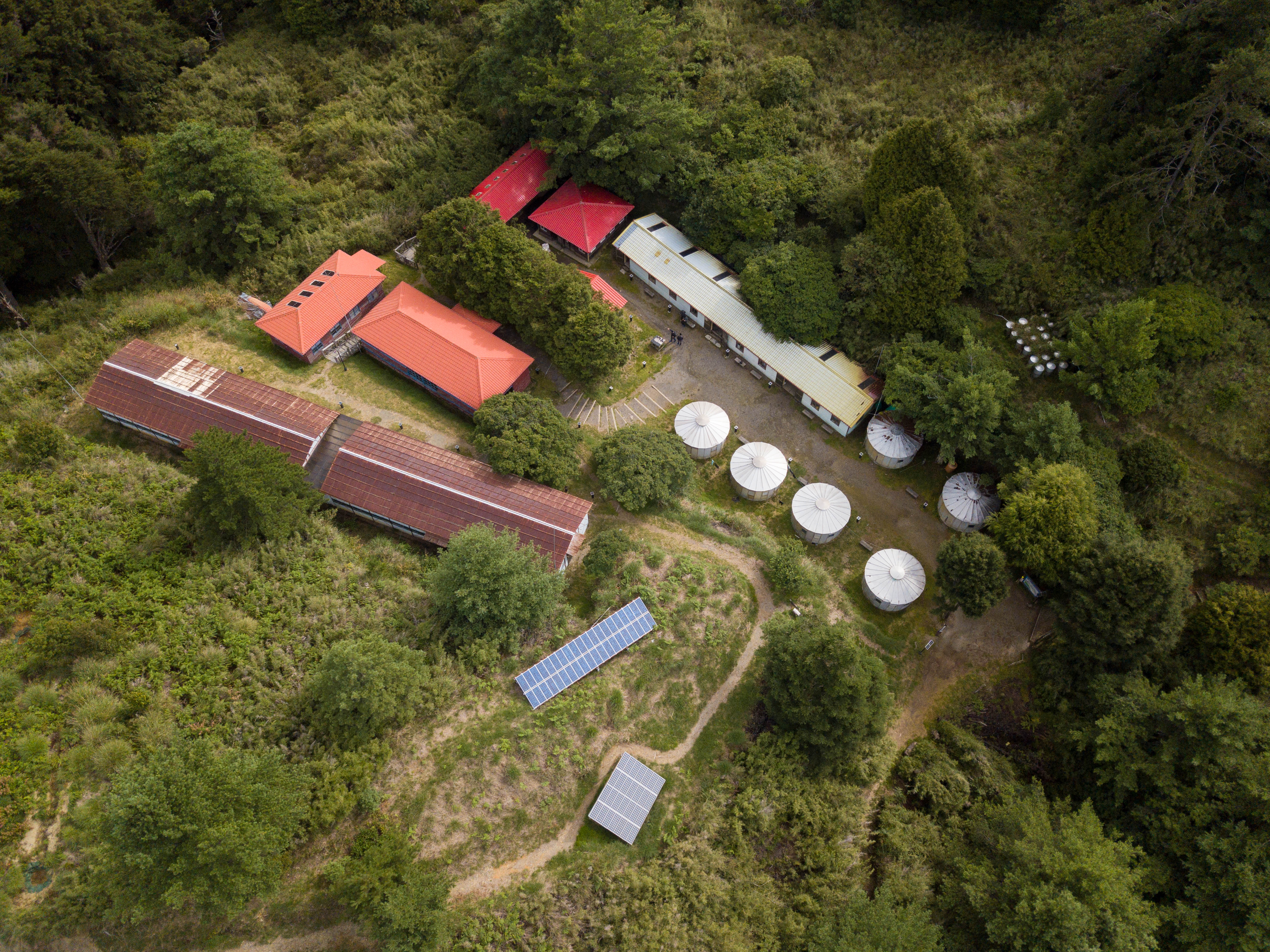
Jiujiu Cabins in Shei-Pa National Park, Taiwan

== See also ==
- Adirondack lean-to
- Bivouac shelter – a tent, or a permanent structure (e.g., a bivacco in the Italian Alps).
- Bothy – a basic shelter found in rural areas in the United Kingdom, particularly Scotland
- Lean-to
- Log cabin – small house built from logs
- Vernacular architecture – traditional architecture in a particular area
- Wilderness hut – rent-free, open dwelling place for temporary accommodation
