= Horse Camp =

Campground on Mount Shasta, California

Coordinates: 41.3722°N 122.2298°W

Horse Camp is a property on Mount Shasta owned by the nonprofit Sierra Club Foundation. It is a 720-acre (2.9 km^{2}) enclave within the Mount Shasta Wilderness of the Shasta-Trinity National Forest in California, United States. It is located at approximately 7,950 feet (2,420 m) elevation at the lower end of Avalanche Gulch, the most popular climbing route on the mountain.

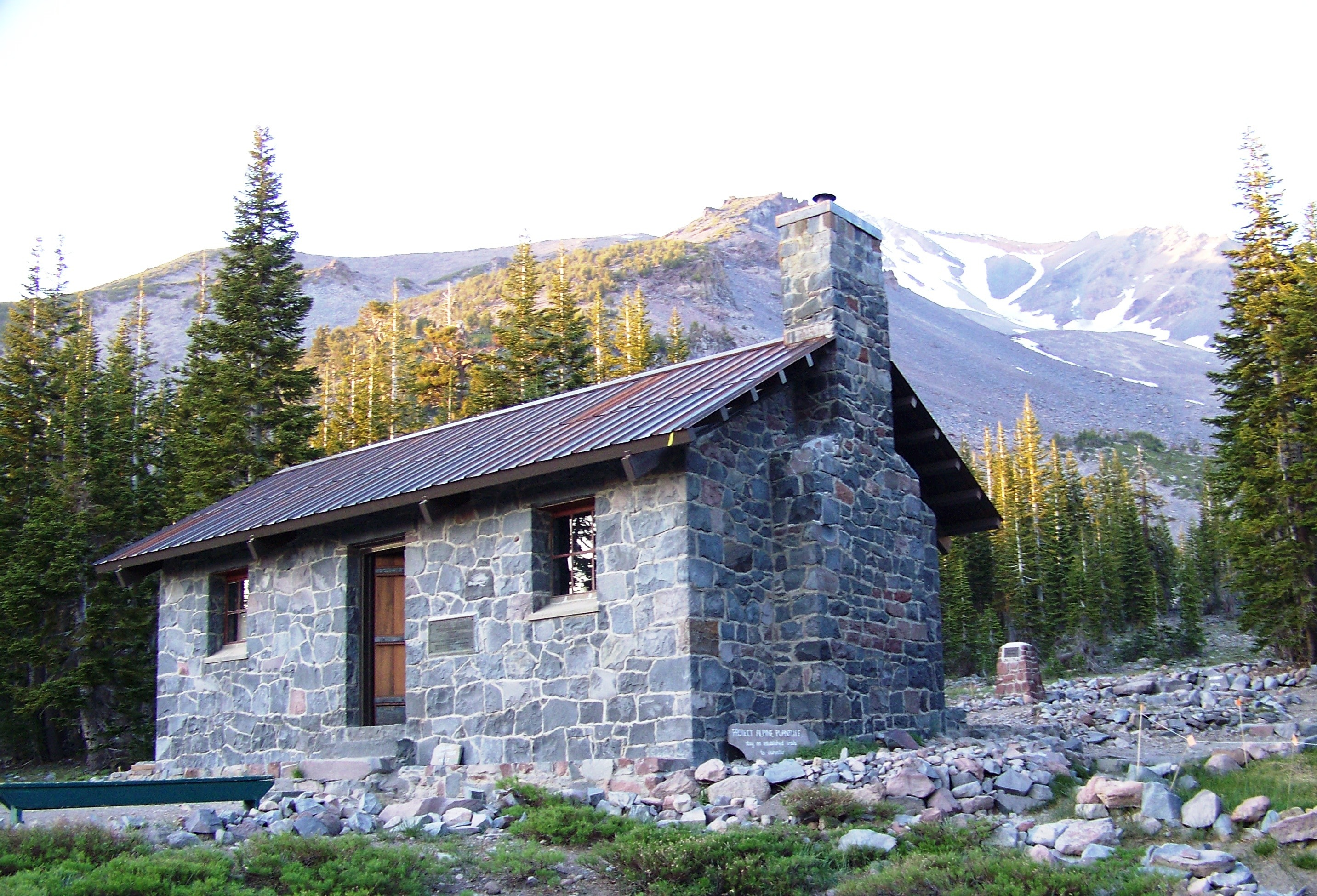
Shasta Alpine Lodge at Horse Camp on Mount Shasta. Avalanche Gulch is to the right of the chimney.

Horse Camp is accessible from the Bunny Flat trailhead by hiking approximately 2 miles (3.2 km) on a developed trail with an elevation gain of about 950 feet (290 m).

The most notable feature of Horse Camp is the Shasta Alpine Lodge, a climber's hut constructed in 1923. Mostly indigenous materials were used for construction, including volcanic rock and Shasta red fir. The lodge can be used for emergency shelter for climbers. It contains a guest register, a library of mountain books, and displays about Mount Shasta.

Other features of Horse Camp include a freshwater spring, low impact campsites, and a solar-powered composting toilet facility.

The lodge measures about 450 square feet (42 m^{2}), and was financed primarily by a donor named Hall McAllister at a cost of $6,725. A caretaker is on duty during the summer months. The first caretaker (1923–1934) was Joseph Macatee "Mac" Olberman (1862–1946). With the help of volunteers, Olberman built a 950 yard long flagstone paved path leading uphill from Horse Camp to facilitate access to the Avalanche Gulch climbing route. This structure still exists and is known as Olberman's Causeway.

The camp and the lodge are open year-round, even when no caretaker is on duty.

Horse Camp is utilized as a mountaineering base camp for ascents of Mount Shasta by Avalanche Gulch, Casaval Ridge, the West Face Gully and other routes on the south and west side of the mountain.
