= Mount Shasta Wilderness =

Protected wilderness area in California, United States

- IUCN category Ib (wilderness area)
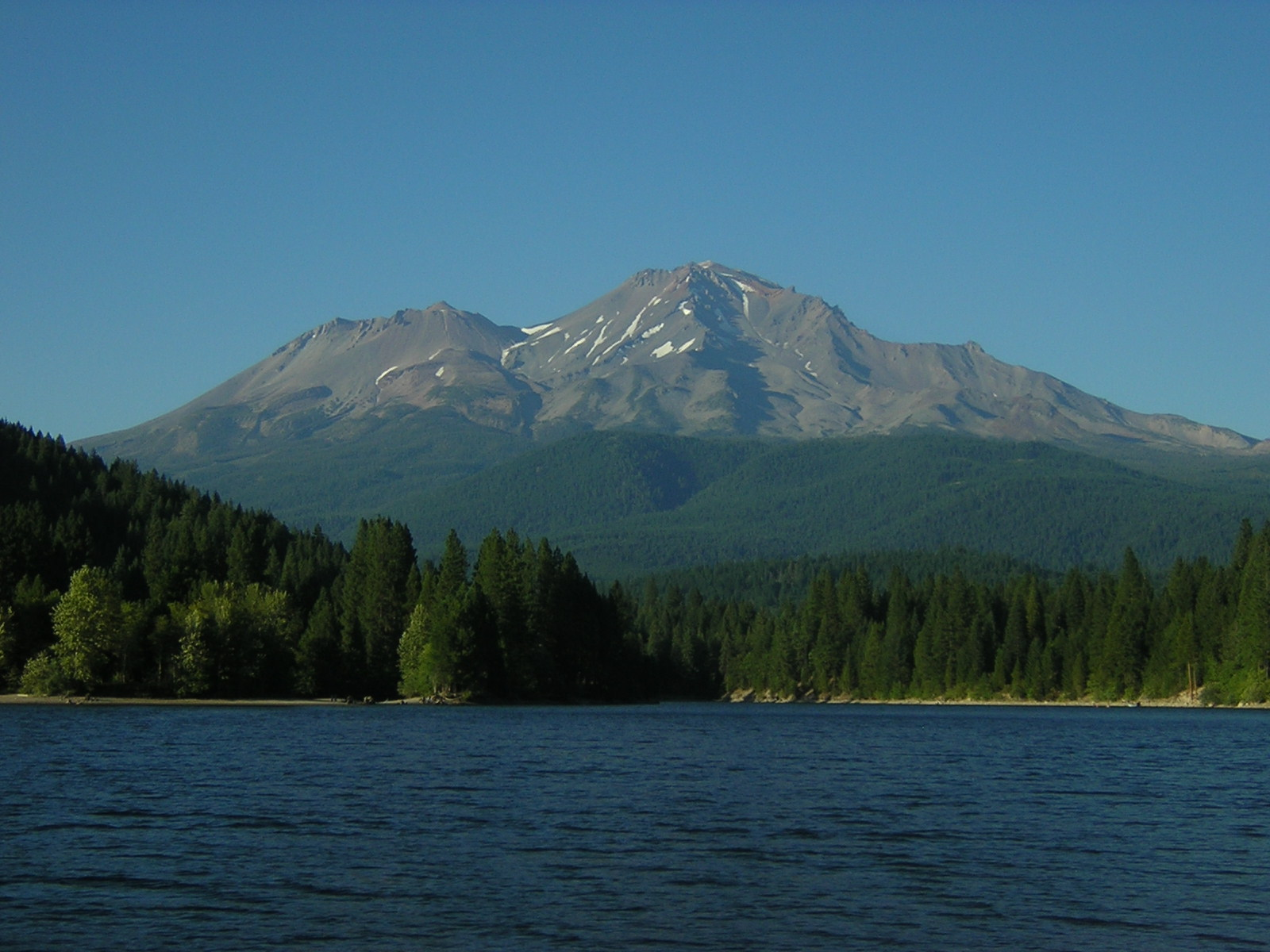
- Mount Shasta

- Location within California Location within the United States
- Interactive map of Mount Shasta Wilderness
- Location: Siskiyou County, California, United States
- Nearest city: Mount Shasta City
- Coordinates: 41°25′08″N 122°12′26″W
- Area: 38,200 acres (59.7 mi^{2}; 155 km^{2})
- Established: 1984
- Governing body: U.S. Forest Service

The Mount Shasta Wilderness is a 38,200-acre (155 km^{2}; 59.7 mi^{2}) federally designated wilderness area located 5 miles (8.0 km) east of Mount Shasta City in northern California. The US Congress passed the 1984 California Wilderness Act that set aside the Mount Shasta Wilderness. The US Forest Service is the managing agency as the wilderness is within the Shasta-Trinity National Forest. The area is named for and is dominated by the Mount Shasta volcano which reaches a traditionally quoted height of 14,162 feet (4,317 m) above sea level, but official sources give values ranging from 14,104 feet (4,299 m) from one USGS project, to 14,179 feet (4,322 m) via the NOAA. Mount Shasta is one of only two peaks in the state over 14,000 feet (4,300 m) outside the Sierra Nevada Mountain Range. The other summit is White Mountain Peak in the Great Basin of east-central California.

The Wintun Glacier is located on Mount Shasta and is the lowest-elevation glacier in the state, lying at 9,100 feet (2,800 m) elevation and extending to the summit.

The smaller volcanic cone of Shastina (12,270 ft) lies one mile (1.6 km) west of Mount Shasta and was formed after the ice-age glaciers melted.

The wilderness protects both pristine forests and areas that were intensively logged and roaded in the past. Although less than half of the mountain remains roadless, Mount Shasta Wilderness is still the premier destination for a variety of activities from mountaineering, day-hiking, and backpacking to cross-country skiing, snowshoeing and ski mountaineering. It is valued for the many scenic, geologic and recreational attributes including glaciers, lava flows, hot springs, waterfalls and forests of Shasta red fir, sugar pine and other conifers.

== Recreation ==
Being a high, solitary and very large mountain with a base diameter of 17 miles (27 km), Mount Shasta can create its own weather patterns which hikers must be aware of. Also, falling rocks are a major danger above timberline. The best time of year for hiking Mount Shasta is June and July, when routes are still snow-covered. Although there is no designated trail to the summit, many cross-country routes ascend to the mountaintop and all require experience in traversing ice and snow.

There are ten trailheads giving access to the wilderness and several short trails leading up the slopes of Mount Shasta with the so-called Shasta Summit Trail (or Avalanche Gulch) being the most popular. This trail, although the "easiest" of the routes, still requires the use of ice axe and crampons. There are four major glaciers and three smaller glaciers radiating from the summit in addition to lava flows on the northern flank composed of andesite and basalt.

A parking permit is required as well as a free wilderness permit and, if attempting a hike above 10,000 feet (3,000 m), a Summit Pass for each climber must be purchased. Human waste must be packed out, and all principles of Leave No Trace etiquette employed. Some restrictions include no dogs in the wilderness, a limit of 10 people in a group and no wood campfires.

== Flora and fauna ==
Forested areas include pure stands of red fir as well as mixed conifer forests of white fir, Douglas-fir, sugar pine, incense cedar and at higher elevations, western white pine. The lava flows on the northeast flank have mountain mahogany and juniper. Underbrush consists of pinemat manzanita, greenleaf manzanita, tanoak, chinquapin, and snowbrush. From 8,000 feet (2,400 m) to timberline are krummholz forms of whitebark pine.

Wildlife include the ubiquitous black bear, coyote, ground squirrel, deer, golden eagles, prairie falcons and red-tail hawks.

Common wildflowers are Shasta lily, miner's lettuce, showy phlox and mountain violet among others.

Notable rare plants in the Mount Shasta Wilderness and surrounding area include Mt. Shasta arnica (Arnica viscosa), Siskiyou Indian paintbrush (Castilleja miniata ssp. elata) and Shasta owl's clover (Orthocarpus pachystachyus). The Siskiyou Indian paintbrush is hemiparasitic, meaning that the plant obtains water and nutrients from the roots of other plants, then manufactures food by photosynthesis. The Shasta owl's clover (Orthocarpus pachystachyus) of the family Scrophulariaceae is critically imperiled and was believed to be extinct. First described in 1848 by Harvard University botanist Asa Gray, the plant was not collected again until 1913. Known only from two reports from the Shasta Valley of northern California, it could not be relocated despite repeated searches of the moist meadows and vernal pools where it was thought originally to have been found. In May, 1996, botanist Dean Taylor of the University of California, Berkeley, rediscovered the evasive plant on the higher, drier ground of a sagebrush-covered hillside. But even in this habitat the wildflower appears to be extraordinarily rare. Taylor was able to find only eight individual plants of the owl’s-clover.

== Sierra Club camp ==
The Sierra Club maintains a private 720-acre (1.13 mi^{2}; 2.9 km^{2}) parcel called Horse Camp within the wilderness. It is used as a base camp for summit attempts, and offers a shelter called the Shasta Alpine Lodge, dedicated in 1923 and built from surrounding volcanic rock and Shasta red fir wood. Horse Camp is staffed during the climbing season from May to September, has a seasonal spring for water and is a traditional destination of many elementary school trips from Siskiyou County schools. Also at Horse Camp is the half-mile-long Olberman Causeway, a stone walkway built in the 1920s by the first caretaker, Mac Olberman from rocks of the surrounding area.

== References and notes ==
Adkinson, Ron Wild Northern California. The Globe Pequot Press, 2001 ISBN 1-56044-781-8
