= Orthocarpus pachystachyus =

Conservation status
- Critically Imperiled (NatureServe)

Scientific classification
- Kingdom: Plantae
- Clade: Tracheophytes
- Clade: Angiosperms
- Clade: Eudicots
- Clade: Asterids
- Order: Lamiales
- Family: Orobanchaceae
- Genus: Orthocarpus
- Species: O. pachystachyus

Binomial name
- Orthocarpus pachystachyus A.Gray

Species of flowering plant

Orthocarpus pachystachyus is a rare species of flowering plant in the broomrape family known by the common names Shasta owl's-clover and Shasta orthocarpus. It is endemic to central Siskiyou County, California, where it is so rarely seen it was thought to be extinct until 1996, when eight individuals were located. The plant grows in an isolated wilderness but since it apparently only occurs on one single hillside it is considered very vulnerable to extinction.

== Description ==
This is a small annual herb producing a stout, hairy, glandular stem up to about 20 centimeters tall. The narrow leaves are up to 5 centimeters long, the upper ones sometimes divided into three to five lobes. The inflorescence is a dense cylindrical spike of wide oval purple-green bracts, the flowers emerging from between them. The lightly hairy flowers are up to 3 centimeters long and pink in color. They are club-shaped, the upper lip a curving beak and the lower lip a wide pouch.
