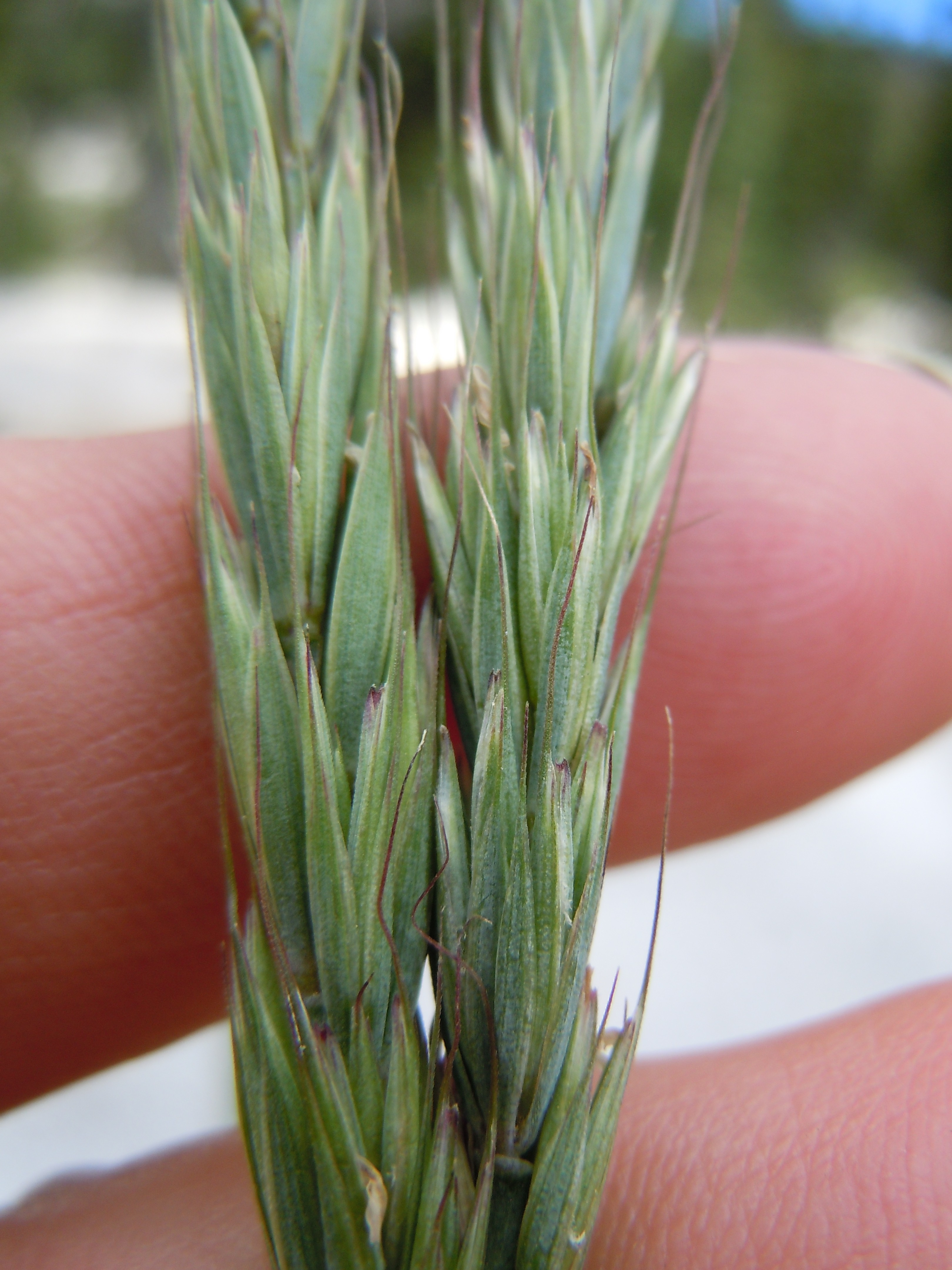
- Spikelets of blue wild rye

Scientific classification
- Kingdom: Plantae
- Clade: Tracheophytes
- Clade: Angiosperms
- Clade: Monocots
- Clade: Commelinids
- Order: Poales
- Family: Poaceae
- Subfamily: Pooideae
- Genus: Elymus
- Species: E. glaucus

Binomial name
- Elymus glaucus Buckley

= Elymus glaucus =

Species of North American grass

Elymus glaucus is a species of grass known as blue wild rye or blue wildrye. This grass is native to North America from Alaska to New York to northern Mexico. It is a common and widespread species of wild rye.

== Description ==
A perennial bunch grass, it grows small, narrow tufts of several erect stems which grow 0.5–1.5 m (1 ft 8 in – 4 ft 11 in) tall. It has a thick, fibrous root system, sometimes with rhizomes, the stems may form stolons. It has flat leaves each up to a centimeter wide at the base and rapidly narrowing to a point.

The tip of the stem is occupied by a narrow, pointed inflorescence many centimeters long made up of a few spikelets. Each spikelet is one to one and a half centimeters long, not counting an awn which may be two or three centimeters in length. Common native grass associates in the far west coastal prairies are Danthonia californica, Deschampsia caespitosa, Festuca idahoensis and Nassella pulchra.

== Ecology ==
It is a larval host to the woodland skipper (Ochlodes sylvanoides).
