= California coastal prairie =

Plant community in California

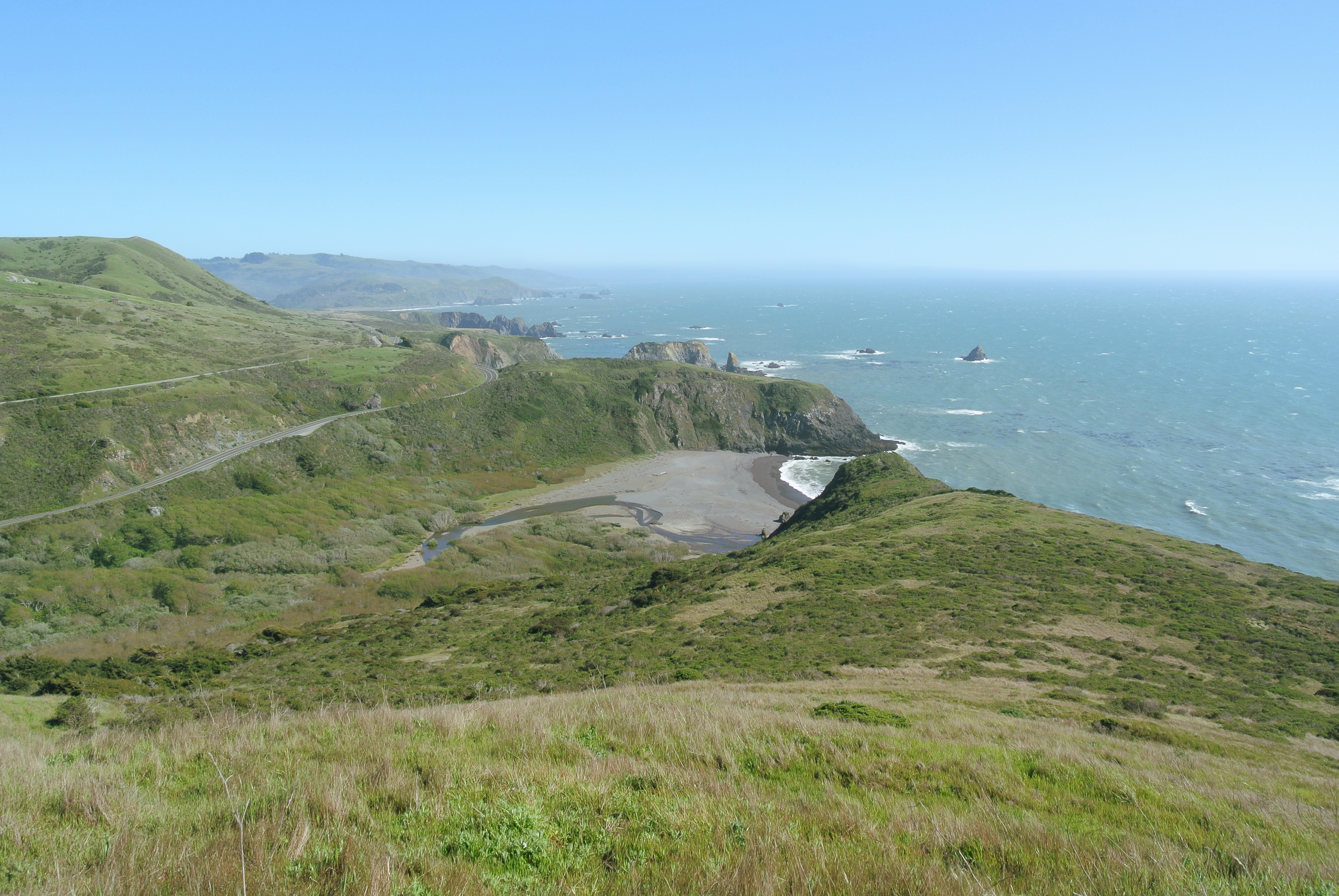
Coastal prairie in the Sonoma Coast State Park north of Jenner

California coastal prairie, also known as northern coastal grassland, is a grassland plant community of California and Oregon in the temperate grasslands, savannas, and shrublands biome. This ecosystem is found along the Pacific Coast, from as far south as Los Angeles in Southern California to southern Oregon. It typically stretches as far inland as 62 mi (100 km), and occurs at altitudes of 1,150 ft (350 m) or lower.

== Description ==
California's coastal prairies are the most species-rich grassland types in North America, with up to 26 species present per square meter. They have been described in literature as "previously unrecognized biodiversity hotspots," and are also known to provide an array of essential services—for instance, carbon storage, water filtration, agriculture, and livestock farming. In spite of the numerous benefits associated with maintaining this ecosystem, it is considered to be one of the most threatened ecosystems in the state of California, with less than one percent of undisturbed coastal prairie remaining today (mainly in or around Point Reyes National Seashore). It is also the single most urbanized major vegetation type in the US; 24% of coastal prairie habitat in California has been lost to urban sprawl.

Among the most defining attributes of the California coastal prairie is its Mediterranean climate. This climate type entails warm and dry summers, cool and wet winters, and mild year-round temperatures as a result of close proximity with the Pacific Ocean. The growing season for these prairies takes place during the winter, and is followed by a dormant, low-rainfall period during the summer. These seasonal changes to water availability have thus spurred a variety of adaptations favoring drought resistance across the many species endemic to these areas. Some perennial grasses utilize humid air as a source of up to 66% of their total water intake, making fog another indispensable abiotic factor in this ecosystem. Other drought-resistant strategies include deep root systems, summer dormancy, and enhanced water storage (e.g. bulbs, tubers, taproots, etc.).

The California coastal prairie is commonly defined by its predominant grass types, of which there are two: Deschampsia coastal prairie (located in Point Reyes peninsula) and Danthonia coastal prairie (located in Bolinas Ridge). This ecosystem can also be characterized by topographic features including sea bluffs, uplifted grassy bald hills, hillside slopes, lowland grasslands, and coastal marine terraces. The centuries-long accumulation of organic matter within these coastal regions has culminated in the production of a rich and dark prairie soil that is commonly referred to as mollisol. As a result, the aforementioned coastal terraces are often used for agricultural purposes, and can be seen in areas such as Santa Cruz and San Luis Obispo.

As a disturbance-dependent ecosystem, these coastal prairies are not only adapted to change, but cannot properly thrive without it. Disruptive factors such as wind, fire, salt spray, digging, and grazing help to maintain more open (as well as healthy) grasslands; for example, they are crucial to facilitating the release of nutrients, stimulating microbial activity, and regulating competition between woody and herbaceous plants. The profile of grazing species inhabiting these prairies has evolved over time in the following manner:

- Pleistocene epoch (>11,700 years ago) – large herbivores (e.g. mammoths, bison, llamas) dominated California's coastal prairies.
- Holocene epoch (10,000 years ago) – small herbivores (e.g. elk, rabbits, gophers, deer) filled the role of the Pleistocene mammals post-extinction event and became the predominant grazing species of the ecosystem.
- Recent (~300 years ago) – domestic cattle, sheep, and horses were brought over to coastal prairies by settlers. By the late 1800s, endemic grazers (such as California's tule elk) neared extinction due to a combination of extensive habitat loss and unsustainable hunting practices.

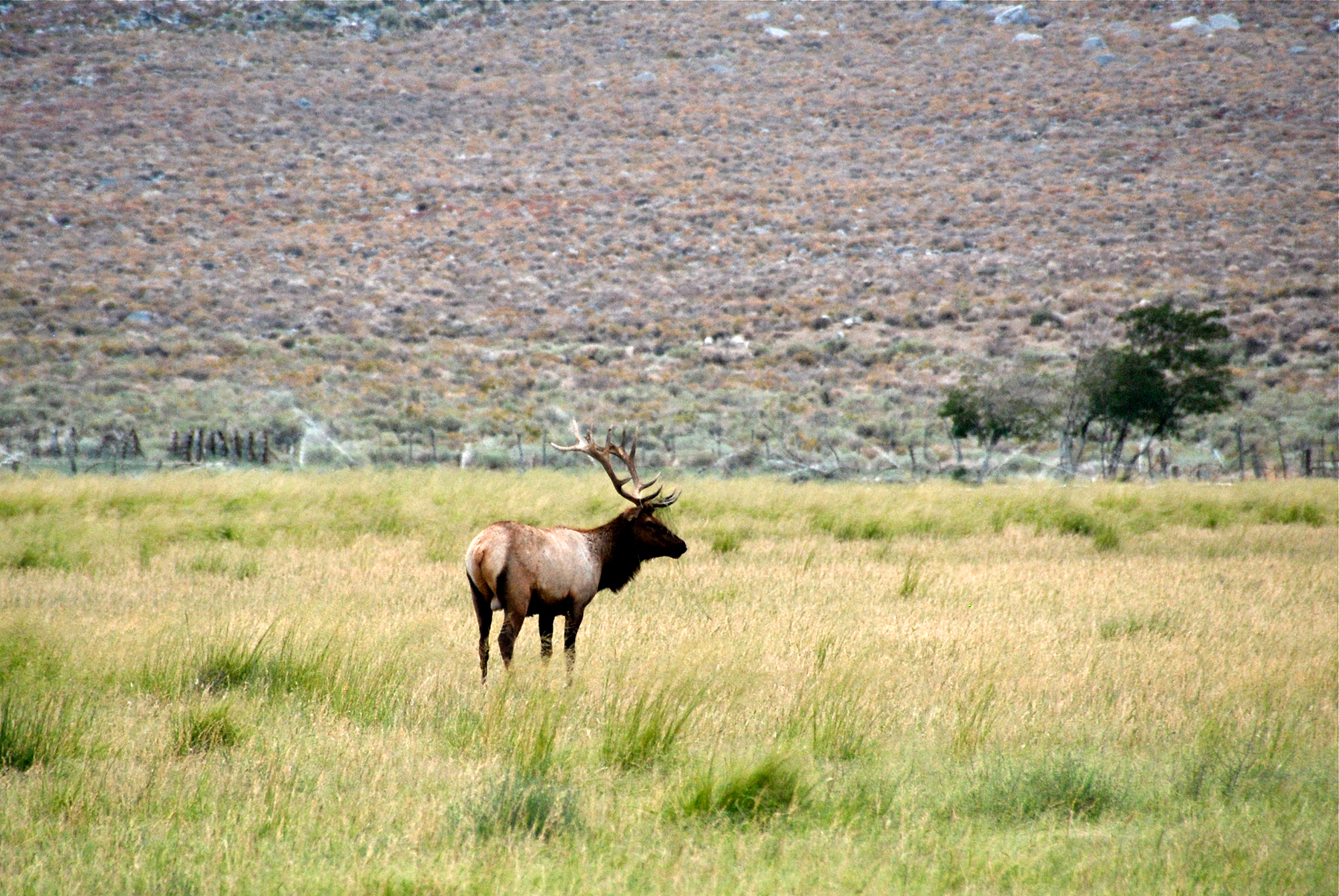
Tule Elk (Cervus elaphus nannodes), one of many protected species that inhabits the California coastal prairie.

Conservation projects within the past couple of decades have involved the conversion of private pastures on coastal prairies into protected land. While these efforts are well-intended, the removal of grazers from this ecosystem rids it of the disturbance it requires, and is therefore thought to be responsible for such metrics as worsening soil quality and declining annual wildflower blooms in these areas. In the absence of frequent fires—especially controlled burns—and many once-prominent grazing and burrowing species that evolved within this ecosystem, much of what is left of the California coastal prairie is being lost to shrub and tree encroachment.

== Indigenous history ==
Before the Spaniards' arrival in California, Native American groups relied on grasslands' ecosystem for resources such as chia seeds, acorns, grass seeds, and game like deer, quail and hares. In order to expand their resource base, they managed the land through fire techniques, which flowered geophytes and boosted the growth of perennial grasses. Burning the existing chaparral and shrublands into grasslands was advantageous for such groups in generating the germination of chaparral annuals and therefore food supply for both humans and the mammals in the area. In general, it created open spaces which were favored by animals and opening up land for gathering fruits and seeds.

In addition, indigenous groups effectively harvested the annual grasses through digging sticks, which dug for underground bulbs and seeds, and the seed basket, which collected seeds, like camas bulbs, and scattered those who weren't ripe in the process.

When the Spanish arrived in the 1800s, cattle was introduced for grazing, effectively replacing the native populations of deer and elk. In the process were introduced non-native species which, along with agriculture and the end of indigenous fire management practices, greatly decreasing the biodiversity of these ecosystems.

== Characteristic species ==
Characteristic species of this community include:

- Perennial bunch grasses:

Bromus carinatus
Calamagrostis foliosa
Danthonia californica
Deschampsia cespitosa
Festuca californica
Festuca elmeri
Festuca idahoensis
Hordeum brachyantherum
Nassella pulchra

- Other plants

Bracken fern – Pteridium aquilinum
Douglas iris – Iris douglasiana
Blue dicks – Dipterostemon capitatus
Blue-eyed grass – Sisyrinchium bellum
Dwarf Owl's Clovers – Triphysaria pusilla

== Endangered species ==
The entire coastal prairie biome can be completely restored, even after the plants seem to have disappeared for decades after grazing end, by unearthing their dormant native seeds in the soil, that are still viable underneath the weeds. Between 1992 and 2000, at 300 Byers Lane, La Selva Beach in Santa Cruz County, 70 acres of habitat went from 99% weed-covered to 95% native covered in only eight years, without sowing any seeds.

Rare and endangered species found in the coastal prairie include:

- Flora

Santa Cruz tarweed – Holocarpha macradenia — found in limited locations
San Francisco popcornflower – Plagiobothrys diffusus
Robust spineflower – Chorizanthe robusta robusta
Artist's popcornflower – Plagiobothrys chorisianus
Pt. Reyes meadowfoam – Limnanthes sp.
Santa Cruz clover – Trifolium buckwestiorum
Indian clover – Trifolium amoenum
Gray's clover – Trifolium grayi
San Francisco owl's clover – Triphysaria floribunda.

- Fauna

Ohlone tiger beetle – Cicindela ohlone — endemic to Santa Cruz County
San Francisco garter snake – Thamnophis sirtalis tetrataenia

== Endangered habitat ==
The coastal prairies remains a unique ecosystem in that it is disturbance-dependent, meaning it relies on disturbances such as fires and grazing to survive. Years of overgrazing as well as the introduction of non-native species have had long-term impacts on Californian coastal prairies, with only 1% of native grassland remaining today. These non-native species are either not suited as feed for the native mammals, or more woody plants have overrun the habitats of native herbs.

Most recently, invasive perennial grasses are the greatest threat. These include velvet grass (Holcus lanatus), tall fescue (Festuca arundinacea), and Harding grass (Phalaris aquatica); the impact of these species can be somewhat ameliorated by well-planned livestock grazing, which can reduce these species' cover and allow native species to persist.

California's coastal prairies are protected by the California Coastal Act, which considers these habitat types to be Environmentally Sensitive Habitat Areas (ESHA). Akin to the endangered species act for habitat types on California's coast, ESHA protections disallow any harm to so designated habitats, except where such harm is necessary to otherwise restore the habitat as a whole (e.g., prescribed fire, grazing).

Coastal Prairies of California are classified as critically endangered with the following stressors causing the most impacts: invasive species, low nutrient soils, urbanization, and unregulated recreational activities. Debates remain on how to apply conservancy efforts to Californian coastal prairies, in balancing disturbances to allow for the flourishing of the native plants as well as quality pasture for grazers. One such organisation focusing on this work is the California Native Grasslands Association, which has led diverse efforts to protect parks and areas with coastal prairies, such as in efforts to protect Point Molate and Tesla Park from construction projects.

== See also ==
- Año Nuevo State Park
- Gray Whale Cove State Beach
- Point Lobos State Natural Reserve
- Sonoma Coast State Park
- Native grasses of California
- Grasslands of California
- Bunch grass
- Invasive grasses of North America
- Invasive species
