= Owl's clover =

Owl's clover may refer to plants in several closely related genera:

- Castilleja
- Orthocarpus
- Triphysaria
