= Triphysaria micrantha =

Scientific classification
- Kingdom: Plantae
- Clade: Tracheophytes
- Clade: Angiosperms
- Clade: Eudicots
- Clade: Asterids
- Order: Lamiales
- Family: Orobanchaceae
- Genus: Triphysaria
- Species: T. micrantha

Binomial name
- Triphysaria micrantha (A.Gray) T.I.Chuang & Heckard

Species of flowering plant

Triphysaria micrantha is a species of flowering plant in the family Orobanchaceae known by the common name purplebeak owl's-clover. It is endemic to California, where it is known from the grasslands of the Central Valley and the foothills to the east and west. It an annual herb producing a hairy, glandular, purple-colored stem up to about 15 centimeters in maximum height. Like many species in its family it is a facultative root parasite on other plants, attaching to their roots via haustoria to tap nutrients. Its greenish to red-purple leaves are up to 2.5 centimeters long and are sometimes divided into a few narrow, pointed lobes. The inflorescence is a spike of flowers a few centimeters in length. Each flower has a narrow purple upper lip and a wide lower lip which is divided into yellowish or white pouches, often with purple markings on the lower parts.
