= Frenchman's Hot Springs =

Thermal spring and recreation area

- Frenchman's Bend Hot Springs; Warfield Hot Springs
- Interactive map of Frenchman's Hot Springs
- Location: Blaine County, Idaho, United States
- Coordinates: 43.64129°N 114.48731°W
- Elevation: 6,400 feet (2,000 m)
- Type: geothermal
- Temperature: Varies, emerges at 124°F (51.11°C)

Frenchman's Hot Springs, also known as Frenchman's Bend Hot Springs or Warfield Hot Springs, is a hot spring located along Warm Springs Creek in the Sawtooth National Forest, 11 miles (17.7 km) from Ketchum, Idaho. The springs are composed of three wide, shallow pools. The pools are rock-walled, with sand and gravel covered bottoms. The average temperature of the springs varies throughout the year, but most of the time, water enters the springs at around 124 °F (51.11 °C). The water in the springs is usually clear.

== Recreation ==
The springs can be accessed by following Warm Springs Road for 11 miles southwest of Ketchum, Idaho. The last 7 miles of the road are a well-maintained dirt road. Parking is limited. The springs are open for public use year-round. However, the springs are often inaccessible during the winter and spring seasons, due to ice, snow, and spring runoff causing avalanches and slick road conditions, making the road impassable. As such, most visitors visit from June to October.

There are three total pools at the springs. One is easily accessible off the main road, whereas the other two pools are reached by wading across Warm Springs Creek. Water is generally at a temperature of 124 °F (51.11 °C) when entering the springs, but can be controlled by shifting rocks in the dam.

While soaking in the pools visitors can admire the nearby Warm Springs Creek, which the hot springs are built upon, along with local wildlife. Local plants include the subalpine fir, the Engelmann spruce, the Douglas fir, chokecherries, alders, willows, tufted hairgrass, sagebrush, and reedgrass. Local animals can include elk, moose, deer, ground squirrels, chipmunks, and snakes.

== Water profile ==
The hot mineral water emerges from the source at 124 °F / 51.11 °C. Underground aquifer temperatures have been recorded at 131 °F. Mineral content analyses show the following in mg/L: Calcium 2.1, Magnesium 0.03, Sodium 69, Potassium 1.90; pH 9.1.
