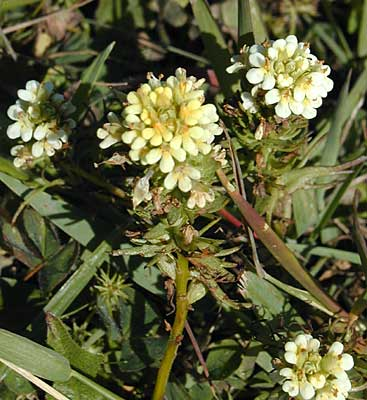

Conservation status
- Imperiled (NatureServe)

Scientific classification
- Kingdom: Plantae
- Clade: Tracheophytes
- Clade: Angiosperms
- Clade: Eudicots
- Clade: Asterids
- Order: Lamiales
- Family: Orobanchaceae
- Genus: Triphysaria
- Species: T. floribunda

Binomial name
- Triphysaria floribunda (Benth.) T.I.Chuang & Heckard

= Triphysaria floribunda =

Species of flowering plant

Triphysaria floribunda is a rare species of flowering plant in the family Orobanchaceae known by the common name San Francisco owl's-clover. It is endemic to California, where it is known only from the San Francisco Bay Area. It is limited to coastal regions of Marin, San Francisco, and San Mateo Counties, where it occurs in coastal prairie habitats, sometimes on serpentine soils.

== Description ==
Triphysaria floribunda is an annual herb producing a hairy to hairless yellow-brown stem up to about 30 centimeters in maximum height. Like many species in its family it is a facultative root parasite on other plants, attaching to their roots via haustoria to tap nutrients. Its greenish leaves are up to 4 centimeters long and are divided into several narrow, pointed lobes.

The inflorescence is a spike of flowers a few centimeters in length. Each flower has a narrow greenish upper lip and a wide lower lip which is divided into yellowish or white pouches.
