= Invasive grasses in North America =

Grasses are one of the most abundant floras on all continents, except Antarctica. Their divergence is estimated to have taken place 200 million years ago. Humans have intentionally and unintentionally introduced these species to North America through travel and trade. On the North American plains, prairies, grasslands, and meadows at least 11% of grasses are non-native. North America is considered a hotspot for many invasive species of grasses, which threatens all of the endangered native grass species and potentially threatens other grass species. Conservation tactics and management policies can help prevent invasive species from taking over and driving native North American plants to extinction.

== Attributes ==
Non-native grasses are classified as invasive if they have the following three attributes:

1. The grass must have a pathway to be delivered to a new location, e.g. boat, shoe, animal, vehicle, feed, contaminated seed, etc.
2. It is able to tolerate its new environment long enough to establish and reproduce.
3. It is able to coexist with native plants. Invasive grasses can outcompete native plants species by manipulating environmental conditions through either chemicals or other physiological factors.

These factors give an upper hand, which will allow the invader to outcompete the native plants. For example, a study conducted in the Mojave Desert of California by Smith et al. in 2006, found that invasive grass species increase in areas with higher concentrations of carbon dioxide (CO_{2}), especially in arid conditions which make up 20% of Earth’s terrestrial surface area. Therefore, the annual invasive grasses will outcompete the natives because they use CO_{2} to their advantage.

== Impacts ==
There are many impacts involving invasive grasses in North America, which range from an ecosystem level to a community level to a genetic level. Such impacts influence habitat structure, disturbance regimes, and nutrient cycling. A successful invasion of a grass may result in new hybrid species, which can have both good and bad results. A good result could be a new species. A bad result could produce a sterile species, which would eventually lead to the extinction of that grass. European Cheatgrass invading the North American prairies is an example of a disturbance regime because it burns quickly and is very susceptible to fire. As a result, it gives invasive grasses a head start in the reproduction process. Another invasive grass impact example, at the ecological level, is Cordgrass or more specifically Spartina anglica. This species arose in England as an allotetraploid of two wild species and was introduced intentionally, to control erosion on the coasts of North America. It now flourishes spreading across the mudflats of the Pacific coast changing them into salt marshes, which has tremendous effects on the fauna of the mudflats such as clams, worms, and anemones.

== Management ==
In order to keep North American native grasses from potentially going extinct from invasive grasses, it is important to control or better yet prevent such invasions in the first place. There are many ways to go about this such as controlling species mechanically or physically. This includes hand removal of grasses or by machine. In a five-year study conducted by Wilson et al. (2001) in Western Oregon, showed that mowing prairies of the invasive grass Arrhenatherum elatius allowed the native grasses Danthonia californica and Festuca roemeri to flourish and out compete the non-natives. This is an effective method for the control of invasive grasses but it will take many hours of hard manual labor, which could be costly. Using chemicals is an effective way to control non-natives but it is not very ecologically friendly. Chemicals such as herbicides can contaminate waterways or kill other plants in the immediate area. Biological control is the use of other organism to reduce the invader grass. This has been proven to be effective but has also ricocheted back in a negative way. Other options include using multiple approaches at the same time, for example, mowing a specific region of grass land and then using an herbicide to target the invasive. The ultimate way to control invasive grasses in North America is to prevent them from entering in the first place. The first step of this prevention is identifying and regulating the grasses' pathway. After that it needs government assessment and policies to see that these pathways are blocked or regulated.
