= Galbreath Wildlands Preserve =

Nature reserve in California

- GWP
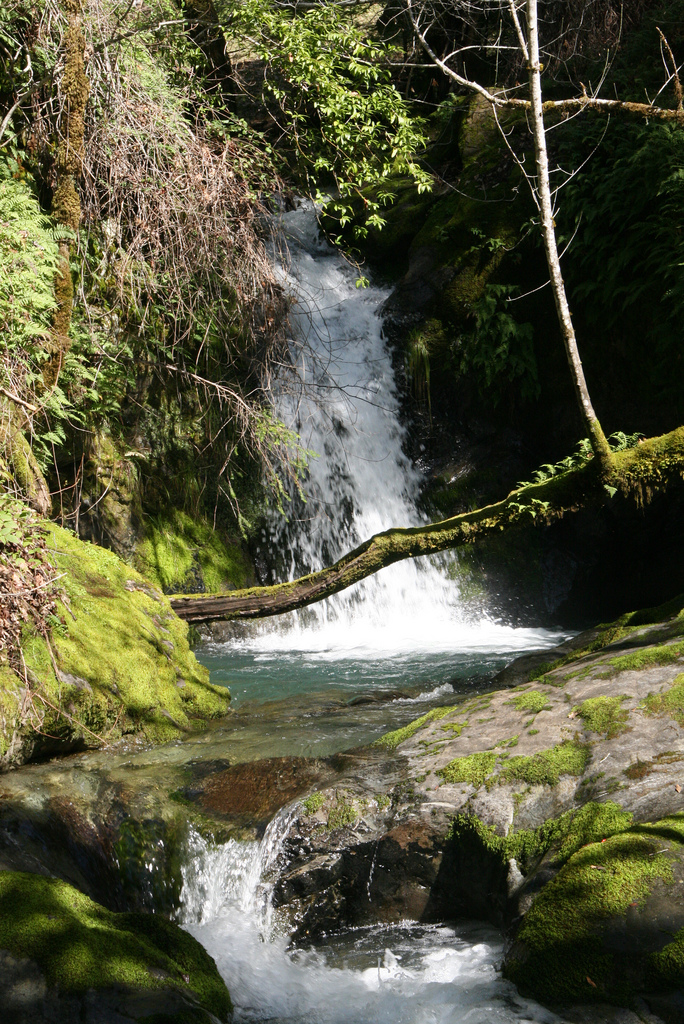
- Waterfall at Galbreath Wildlands Preserve

- Location within California
- Location: Mendocino County, California, United States
- Nearest city: Boonville
- Coordinates: 38°52′15″N 123°15′50″W
- Area: 3,670 acres (14.9 km^{2})
- Established: 2004
- Website: cei.sonoma.edu/preserves/galbreath

The Galbreath Wildlands Preserve is a 3,670-acre (14.9 km^{2}) nature reserve in Mendocino County, California, United States, established in 2004 in honor of Fred Burckhalter Galbreath (1901-2000). The preserve, a former sheep ranch, is located in the Outer Coast Range 17 miles (27 km) from the coast, near Yorkville. The Preserve features woodland, forest and grassland communities that lie at the edge of coastal fog influence. Lands are in the upper Rancheria sub-basin of the Navarro Watershed and contain 1st - 5th order streams. The Preserve's forests are primarily second-growth coniferous forest and hardwood.

== History ==
At the time of historic contact with Europeans, the Preserve was within the territory of the Central Pomo people. Central Pomo speakers occupied land from the southern Mendocino coast at the mouth of the Gualala River, extending north just above the Navarro River and east to the crest of the Russian River divide, approximately 40 miles (64 km) inland. The redwood-covered mountains between the coast and the valleys were only seasonally inhabited and were accessed along defined trail routes. Villages and campsites were more common in the warmer interior on the eastern border of the redwood belt, with permanent villages in more favorable locations.

Several villages and campsites occurred near the Preserve along Rancheria Creek and areas southwest of Yorkville. Late, the principal village in this area, was located on the west bank of Rancheria Creek approximately one mile west of Yorkville. The people of Late were referred to as Danokeya, or “upstreamers,” by coastal Pomo. Other villages and camps nearby included Polma, on the west side of Rancheria Creek 1 mile (1.6 km) southwest of Yorkville; Kalaicolem, 1.25 miles (2.01 km) south‐southwest of Yorkville; and Lali, near the head of Rancheria Creek 2 miles (3.2 km) southwest of the town of Whitehall. The tribelet community consisted of several villages of 100 to 2,000 people belonging to one or more extended kin groups. A headman in each extended family acted as leader and formed a tribal council with other extended family leaders.

The Central Pomo had amicable interactions with their neighbors, often venturing seasonally into the territories belonging to other Pomo groups to hunt and gather. Relationships with groups living in more distant areas were maintained through social and economic exchange. The Clear Lake area was regularly visited for its distinctive fisheries, as well as the unusual mineral resources available there (magnesite, steatite, and two sources of obsidian). Trips to the coast were made to collect clams and other sea food.

Because the nearest mission was far to the south in the town of Sonoma (Mission San Francisco de Solano), the Central Pomo were largely spared the conflicts endured by other tribes during the Spanish Mission Period. However, in the mid-1840s, Mexico granted three land grants as far north as Mendocino County: the Sanel Valley, Yokaya and an unnamed grant in Point Arena. Central Pomo may have been recruited to work for these Mexican ranchos.

The United States assumed control of Alta California in 1848 and the first American settlers began to claim lands in the area. The earliest structures recorded on the Preserve are the “Livingston’s house” and an old trail. Both appear on the United States General Land Office map in 1884. Features within 1 mile of the Preserve include the “Leaford’s house”, an old road to Whitehall, a road to Cloverdale, a spring, and old trail.

Similar to other areas in the region, Douglas fir and redwood were heavily logged between the late 1800s and early 1900s.

Fred Burckhalter Galbreath, who worked in the marine insurance industry in San Francisco, bought the land in 1944 as a working sheep ranch and undertook a wide variety of projects to improve the health of habitats on the property. He reduced sedimentation by undertaking drainage improvement projects, removed the invasive wild boars through hunting, and engaged in selective forestry to reduce downed woody debris and remove old and diseased trees. Throughout his life, Galbreath valued protection of natural resources and the knowledge needed to make wise land management decisions. He also sought to protect his land in perpetuity as a site for higher education.

After he died at the age of 98, the Galbreath Wildlands Preserve was donated to Sonoma State University through a living trust, by Galbreath's family (Bob and Sue Johnson, and Nancy and Kleve Johnson). The lands are now managed for research and educational value.

== Geography ==
The 3,670-acre (1,490 ha) Galbreath Wildlands Preserve lies in the upper Navarro Watershed in the Coast Range of northern California. Located approximately 17 miles (27 km) inland from the Pacific Ocean in southern Mendocino County, this topographically diverse landscape ranges from 900 to 2,200 feet (270 to 670 meters) in elevation and includes coniferous forests (Douglas-fir and redwood), mixed hardwood-conifer forests (Douglas-fir, tanoak, madrone), oak woodlands (mostly black and Oregon white oaks), and annual grasslands and riparian woodland. Rancheria Creek flows northward through the preserve, along with numerous seasonal tributaries, and drains into the Navarro River. The nearest towns are Cloverdale (20 miles/32 km) and Boonville (18 miles/29 km). The small outpost of Yorkville is 5 miles (8.0 km) from the Preserve.

== Geology ==
The Navarro River watershed contains the highly erodible Franciscan mélange (a jumbled matrix of rock types created as the Pacific tectonic plate subducts beneath the North American plate) and alluvial fill, as well as the Coastal Belt of the Franciscan Assemblage, which is more stable and resistant to erosion. Although serpentine outcrops, which are characteristic of this formation, are common locally, exposed serpentine has not been found on the Preserve. Alluvial fill occurs in Anderson Valley and low-lying areas of major tributaries, such as Rancheria Creek, and Franciscan melange is associated with middle and upper Rancheria Creek. Most of the rest of the watershed contains soil derived from the Coastal Belt of the Franciscan Assemblage.

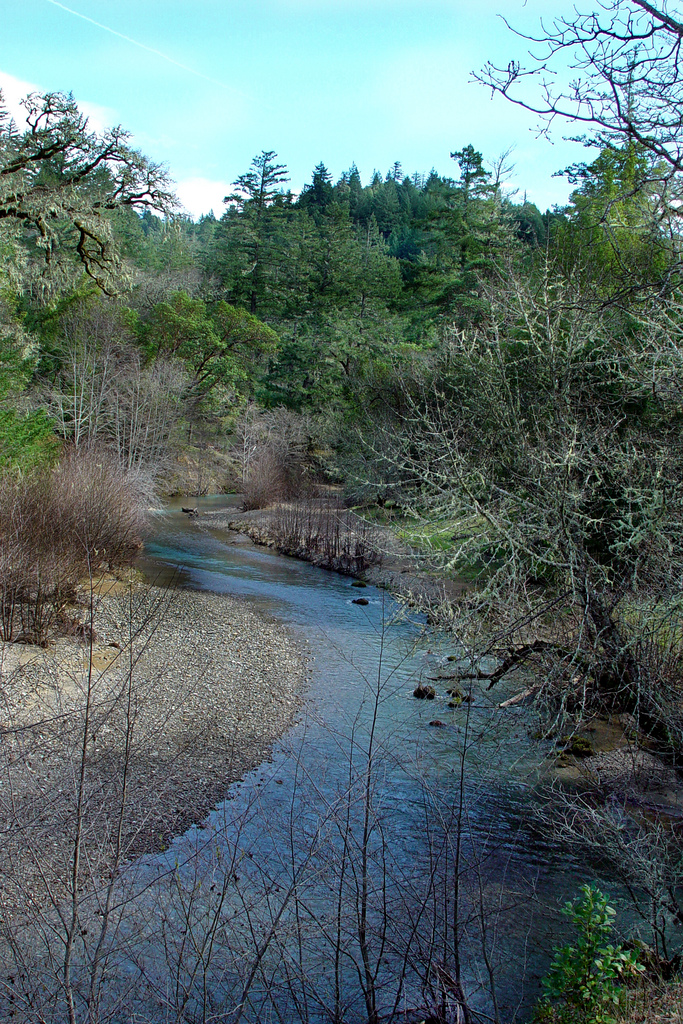
Rancheria Creek running through GWP

== Hydrology ==
The Galbreath Preserve lies in the upper Rancheria sub-basin of the Navarro Watershed, and contains 1st, 2nd, 3rd, 4th, and 5th order streams. Rancheria Creek flows northward through the Preserve and drains into the Navarro River. Rancheria Creek dries up during the summer, but its tributaries, such as Yale Creek, which lie in steep canyons, can remain wet throughout the summer. Since 1951, a USGS stream flow gage has been maintained about nine miles upstream of the mouth of the Navarro. Throughout the Navarro watershed, recent alluvium, stream channel, and terrace deposits provide groundwater recharge to surface streams and supply wells and springs. Only minor amounts of groundwater are contributed by the Franciscan Formation. Flows dry up in tributaries during summer months, with the only surface water present derived from springs. Only the mainstem Navarro River, North Fork Navarro River, and lower reaches of Anderson, Rancheria, and Indian Creeks contain year-round surface water.

Two natural ponds occur on ridgeline in the southern portion of the Preserve. Wood Duck Pond is fed by a spring and contains water year-round. An unnamed pond nearby dries seasonally.

== Vegetation ==
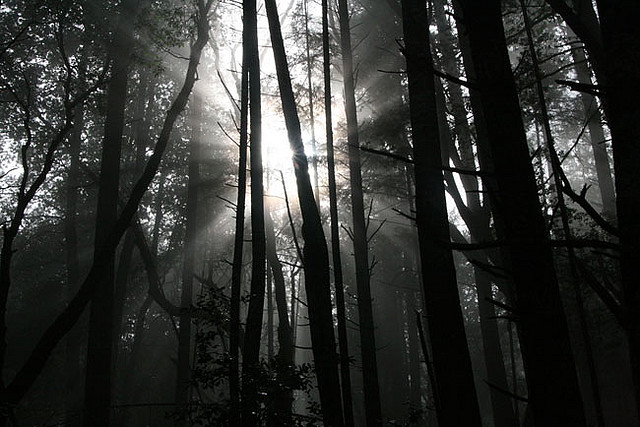
Trees near Wood Duck Pond at GWP.

Vegetation occurs in mosaics representative of the inner North Coast Range (NCoRI) and the outer North Coast Range (NCoRO) geo-floristic districts. Vegetation types in the watershed roughly follow soil type. Franciscan mélange derived soils support grassland, the Franciscan Coastal Belt derived soils support grass-scrub or forested vegetation, and valley fill supports mixed forest.

Preserve vegetation types in order of abundance are:

- Pacific Douglas Fir Forest (1980 acres, 51.4%) - Over half the Preserve is Douglas fir (Pseuotsuga menziezii) forest, characterized by a higher, irregular overstory of Douglas fir and lower overstory of sclerophyllous broad leaved evergreen trees, such as tanoak (Notholithocarpus densiflorus) and Pacific madrone (Arbutus menziesii). Sugar pines (Pinus lambertiana) occur in isolated locations on some ridgelines.
- Hardwood Forests (1600 acres, 42%) – Hardwood forest types on the Preserve include Interior Mixed Hardwood, Montane Mixed Hardwood, and Single Dominant Hardwood. Montane hardwood habitat typically consists of an evergreen hardwood tree layer, a patchy shrub layer, and sparse herbaceous cover. Canyon oak is the usual dominant on steep slopes, replaced by huckleberry oak at higher elevations and pines at still higher elevations. Associates include tanoak, Pacific madrone, Douglas-fir, and California black oak (Quercus kelloggii). Some areas of the Preserve support single species dominants, including California Bay laurel (Umbellularia californica), Tanoak, Valley Oak (Quercus lobata), Canyon Live Oak (Quercus chrysolepis), Interior Live Oak (Quercus wislizeni var. wislizeni), Oregon White Oak (Quercus garyana) and Coast Live Oak (Quercus agrifolia). Sudden oak death (Phytophthora ramorum) was recently documented on the Preserve and is the subject of on-going monitoring.
- Annual Grasslands and Forbs (160 acres, 4%) - Annual grassland habitat is open and composed primarily of annual plant species. Non-native forage grasses are usually dominant, including European grasses and some invasive perennials such as Harding grass (Phalaris aquatic). Areas dominated by native perennial grasses are patchy.
- Redwood Douglas Fir Forest (57 acres, 1.5%) – Redwood forest is a composite name for a variety of conifer species growing in the coastal zone and is usually a mixture of several tree species, including redwood, Sitka spruce, grand fir, red alder, and Douglas-fir. Redwoods (Sequoia sempervirens) are the dominant tree species near the coast and in flood plants, and are mostly limited to drainages and north slopes on the northern portion of the preserve. Inland and higher in the watershed, Douglas-fir becomes dominant, where tanoak and madrone are its primary associates. They also co-occur with Douglas fir. Field reconnaissance suggests that redwoods are underestimated in the Calveg data.

== Vertebrates ==
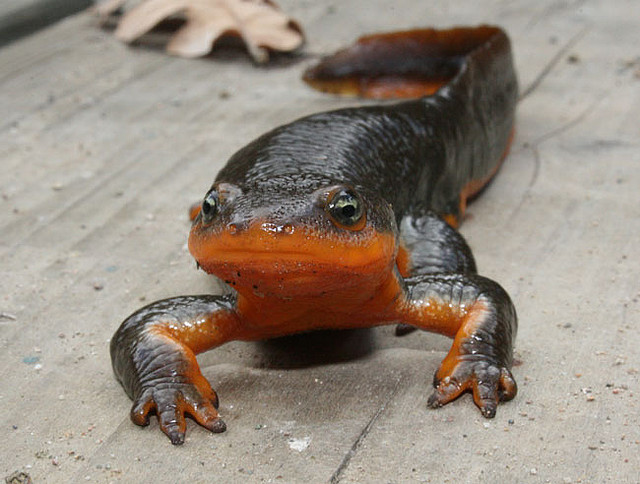
California newt found at GWP.

Grasslands, woodlands, forests and aquatic habitats support a diversity of plants and animals. The Preserve is relatively unexplored and knowledge about species occurrences and distributions on the property is still being compiled. Species lists are available for vascular plants, special status plants, vertebrates, and fungi. A wildlife camera on the site has documented the presence of American black bear, wild boar, bobcat, coyote, mule deer, gray fox, and wild turkey.

- Top predators are still present within the landscape, and include mountain lion (Puma concolor), black bear (Ursus americanus), golden eagle (Aquila chrysaetos), osprey (Pandion haliaetus), coyote (Canis latrans), bobcat (Lynx rufus) and gray fox (Urocyon cinereoargenteus).
- Rancheria Creek and its tributaries support anadromous fish that make the journey inland from the ocean to breed and over-summer in cool waters of the upper watershed. Northern California Steelhead (Oncorhynchus mykiss) and California Coastal Chinook Salmon (Oncorhynchus tshawytscha) – both listed as federally threatened - were once abundant in Rancheria Creek. Between 1948 and 1952, large numbers of Coho and Steelhead were rescued from drying areas of Rancheria Creek by California Department of Fish and Wildlife. Today, Coho have largely disappeared from the upper watershed. Steelhead are still present and have been documented by CDFW in Rancheria Creek in 1994, 2000, and 2001. The NOAA National Marine Fisheries Service considers Rancheria Creek a “critical habitat” for the Northern California Steelhead.
- Riparian areas include coastal species, such as Merganzers (Mergus merganser), that fly inland along the Navarro River. Most species observed, however, are typical of riparian inland areas, such as yellow-legged frog (Rana boylii), western pond turtle (Emys marmorata), garter snakes (Thamnophis atratus, Thamnophis sirtalis), and red-bellied newts (Taricha rivularis). Pacific giant salamanders (Dicamptodon ensatus) breed along water courses and retreat to burrows in the cool canyons. Natural and man-made ponds attract breeding newts (Taricha granulosa and Taricha torosa), garter snakes (Thamnophis elegans), and wood ducks (Aix sponsa). Bullfrogs (Rana catesbeiana), which are non-native and known to feed on a variety of native amphibians and reptiles, are found in Rancheria Creek.

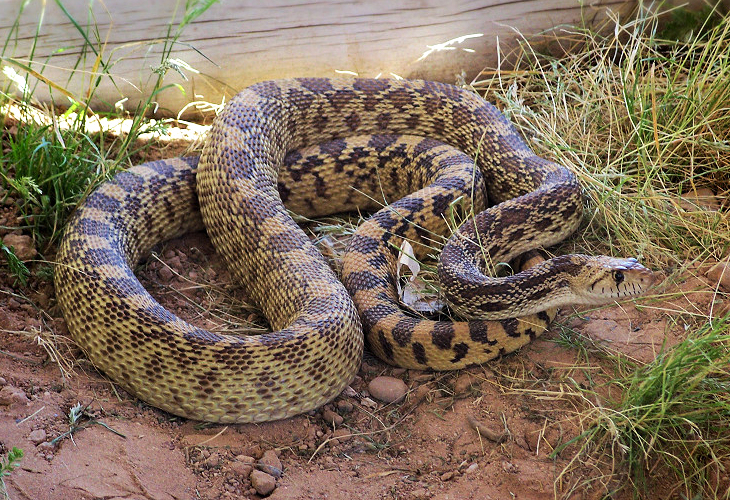
Gopher snake (Pituophis catenifer)

- Upland habitats are dominated by a patchwork of Douglas fir, redwood, and hardwood forests. The majority of Douglas fir and redwood forests are secondary growth, decreasing the potential for federally threatened marbled murrelets and northern spotted owls. Species occurring in redwood and Douglas fir forests include red-tailed hawks (Buteo jamaicensis) and violet-green swallows (Tachycineta thalassina) in the overstory; pileated woodpeckers (Dryocopus pileatus), red-breasted sapsuckers (Sphyrapicus ruber) and western grey squirrel (Sciurus griseus) in the understory canopy; and brown creepers (Certhia americana) and white-breasted nuthatches (Sitta carolinensis) in the shrub layer. Blue grouse (Dendragapus obscura), which eat conifer needles in the winter, are found in forest clearings.

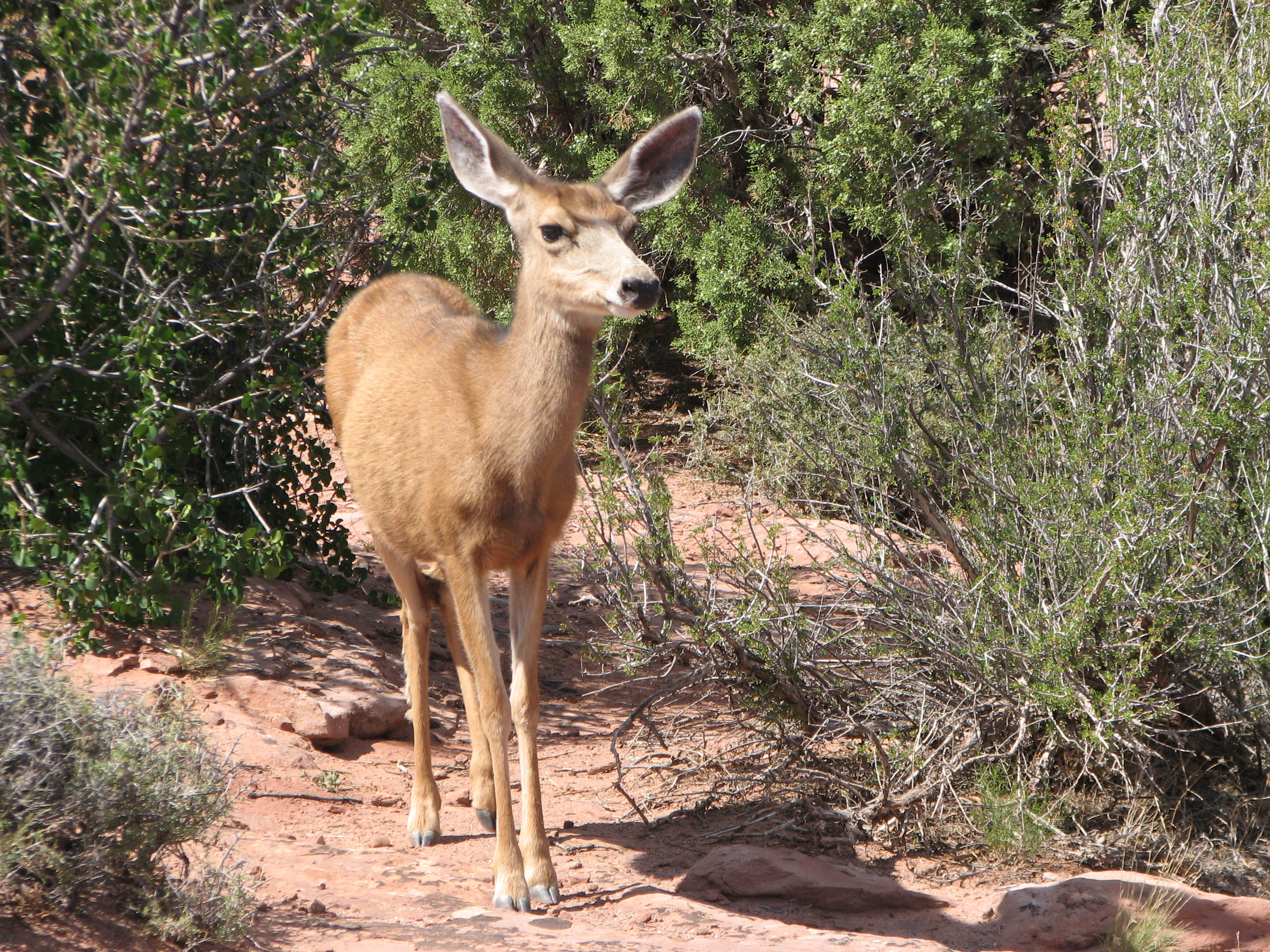
Mule deer (Odocoileus hemionus)

- Nine species of oaks occur in woodlands and forests of the Preserve. Acorns are a key resource for black-tailed deer (Odocoileus hemionus), black bear (Ursus americanus), scrub jays (Aphelocoma californica), California quail (Callipepla californica), band-tailed pigeons (Columba fasciata), and acorn woodpeckers (Melanerpes formicivorus) among others. Non-native feral pigs (Sus scrofa) and turkeys (Meleagris gallopavo), which also are avid acorn eaters, can occur in large numbers throughout Preserve. In some years, ground disturbance from feral pigs is extensive.

== At-risk Species ==
The following species have been documented at the Preserve, and are considered at risk of extinction.

At-risk Species
Common name	Scientific name	Status
Plants
Franciscan Onion	Allium peninsulare var. franciscanum	CNPS 1B.2
White-Flowered Rein Orchid	Piperia candida	CNPS 1B.2
Santa Cruz Clover	Trifolium buckwestiorum	CNPS 1B.1
Fishes
Northern California Steelhead	Oncorhynchus mykiss	T
Amphibians
Foothill Yellow-Legged Frog	Rana boylii	SSC, S2S3, BLM:S, USFS:S
Reptilian Vertebrates
Western Pond Turtle	Actinemys marmorata	SSC, S3, IUCN:VU
Birds
Allen's Hummingbird	Selasphorus sasin	ABC:Y
Cooper's Hawk	Accipiter cooperii	S3
Sharp-Shinned Hawk	Accipiter striatus	S3
Golden Eagle	Aquila chrysaetos	S3, BLM:S, CDF:S
Bald Eagle	Haliaeetus leucocephalus	S2, CDF:S
Osprey	Pandion haliaetus	S3, CDF:S
Mountain Quail	Oreortyx pictus	ABC:Y
Hermit Warbler	Dendroica occidentalis	ABC:Y
Varied Thrush	Ixoreus naevius	ABC:Y
Mammals
Yuma Myotis (Bat)	Myotis yumanensis	BLM:S
Sonoma Tree Vole	Arborimus pomo	SSC

Key to Status Codes
Code	Agency	Status
ABC:Y	American Bird Conservatory	Yellow Watch List
BLM:S	Bureau of Land Management	Sensitive
CDF:S	Cal Fire	Sensitive
CNPS 1B.1	California Native Plant Society	Seriously threatened in California
CNPS 1B.2	California Native Plant Society	Fairly threatened in California
IUCN-V	International Union for Conservation of Nature	Vulnerable
USFS:S	US Forest Service	Sensitive Species
S2	Natural Heritage/NatureServe Subnational Rank	Imperiled
S3	Natural Heritage/NatureServe Subnational Rank	Vulnerable
SSC	California Department of Fish and Wildlife	Species of Special Concern
T	U.S. Fish & Wildlife Service	Federally threatened

== Local land use ==
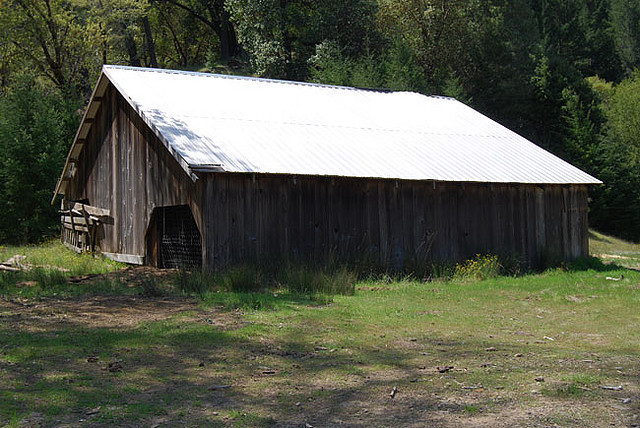
Old sheep barn at GWP

The Galbreath Wildlands Preserve is representative of the Upper Rancheria and Navarro watersheds. Within the Rancheria Creek sub-basin, major land uses include sheep and cattle ranching, timber harvest, and open space and rural residential homes, with only a few locations in field and row crops. Like much of the rest of the North Coast of California, timber harvest began in the mid-nineteenth century and has continued to the present. By the 1870s, sheep and cattle ranching had begun. Only recently have agriculture practices begun. Between 1984 and 1996, the number of new vineyards drastically increased in the upper sub-basin and numbers continue to rise. Present day land use in the Navarro watershed is 70% forestry, 25% ranching, and 5% row crops, orchards and vineyards, with a small percent rural residential development.

Relatively steep, low order headwater streams have been affected by timber harvest, roads, and grazing management. Agricultural practices, grading, and other land disturbances also contribute to high levels of sedimentation in the Navarro River watershed. Sediment production rates decreased during the 1980s and '90s from historic highs during the 1950s through '70s due to changes in harvest practices and improved construction and maintenance of active logging roads. Another key management challenge is controlling feral pigs (Sus scrofa) and invasive plants, such as scotch broom (Cytisus scoparius) and yellow-star thistle (Centaurea solstitialis). Sudden oak death was recently discovered on the Preserve and declines in some oak species, especially tanoak is anticipated, causing an increase in standing deadwood.

== Climate ==
Rainfall and floods are seasonal, falling primarily between October and May, and are typical of the wet Mediterranean-type climate of north coastal California. The Navarro River watershed receives about 40 inches of rainfall with about 60% falling during winter months from mid-December through the end of March. In nearby Yorkville the warmest months are July and August (91/90 F average high and 55/56 F average low respectively) and coolest are in December and January (55/56 F average high and 37/37 F average low respectively). The highest recorded temperature was 115 °F in 1955 and the lowest recorded temperature was 13 °F in 1972. Rainfall average is 40.2 inches, with the lowest average monthly rainfall in July (0.02 in) and August (0.09 in) and the highest average is December (7.91 in). Large storms and floods are episodic. Since the 1950s significant floods have occurred frequently, on a temporal scale of about once a decade.

== Facilities ==
Facilities at the Preserve are limited to two campgrounds for overnight stays or day use. The larger campground is located along Rancheria Creek and includes a fire ring. The small campground is located approximately 0.5 miles from the entrance and includes a composting toilet. For both sites, all water must be brought in by visitors. A small storage shed is available for researchers interested in leaving equipment on site.

An 8-mile road traverses most of the Preserve and is 4-wheel drive accessible only. Access may be restricted immediately after a rain. Phone service is not available. Cell phone reception is possible at only two sites within the Preserve.

Facility planning is currently in process for developing on-site utilities and buildings to support educational and research use of the site. This includes plans for an astronomical observatory that will be used for advanced research, instruction, and outreach. The observatory will be a remotely operated 1-metre (3.3 ft) telescope for finding extra-solar planets and near-Earth asteroids.

== See also ==
- Fairfield Osborn Preserve
- Los Guillicos Preserve
