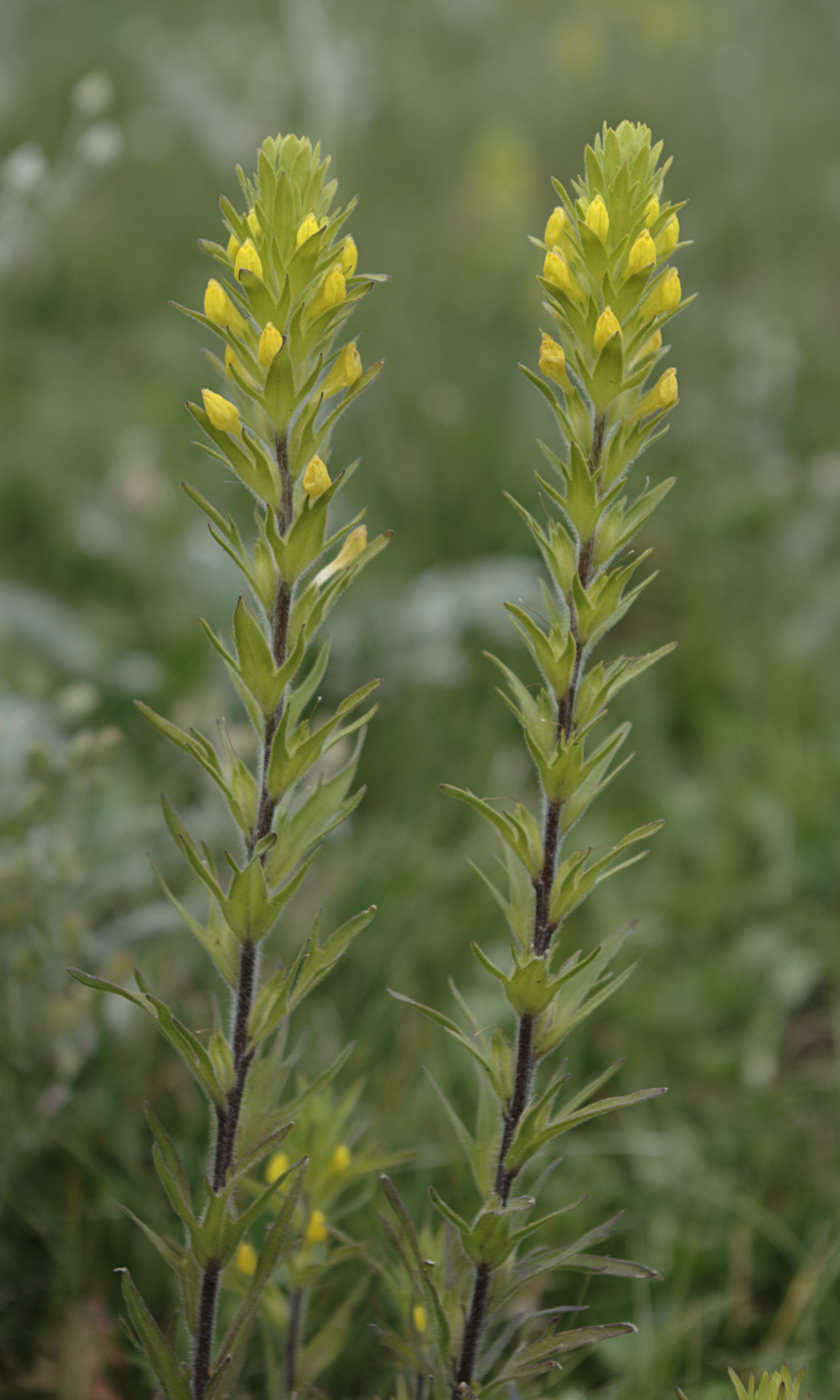

Conservation status
- Secure (NatureServe)

Scientific classification
- Kingdom: Plantae
- Clade: Tracheophytes
- Clade: Angiosperms
- Clade: Eudicots
- Clade: Asterids
- Order: Lamiales
- Family: Orobanchaceae
- Genus: Orthocarpus
- Species: O. luteus

Binomial name
- Orthocarpus luteus Nutt.

Synonyms
- Orthocarpus strictus

= Orthocarpus luteus =

Plant species in the broomrape family

Orthocarpus luteus is a species of flowering plant in the broomrape family known by the common name yellow owl's-clover. It is native to much of western and central North America, where it grows in many types of plateau, grassland, and mountain habitat.

== Description ==
It is an annual herb producing a slender, hairy, glandular, bright yellowish green to deep purple stem up to about 40 centimeters tall. The narrow leaves are up to 5 centimeters long, the upper ones sometimes divided into three lobes. The inflorescence is a dense cylindrical spike of green bracts, the flowers emerging from between them. The lightly hairy flowers are 1 to 1.5 centimeters long and bright yellow in color. They are club-shaped, the upper lip a tiny, curving beak and the lower lip a narrow pouch.

== Taxonomy ==
Orthocarpus luteus was given its scientific name in 1818 by Thomas Nuttall. It is classified in the genus Orthocarpus within the family Orobanchaceae. It has one heterotypic synonym, Orthocarpus strictus created by George Bentham in 1835 and no subspecies.
