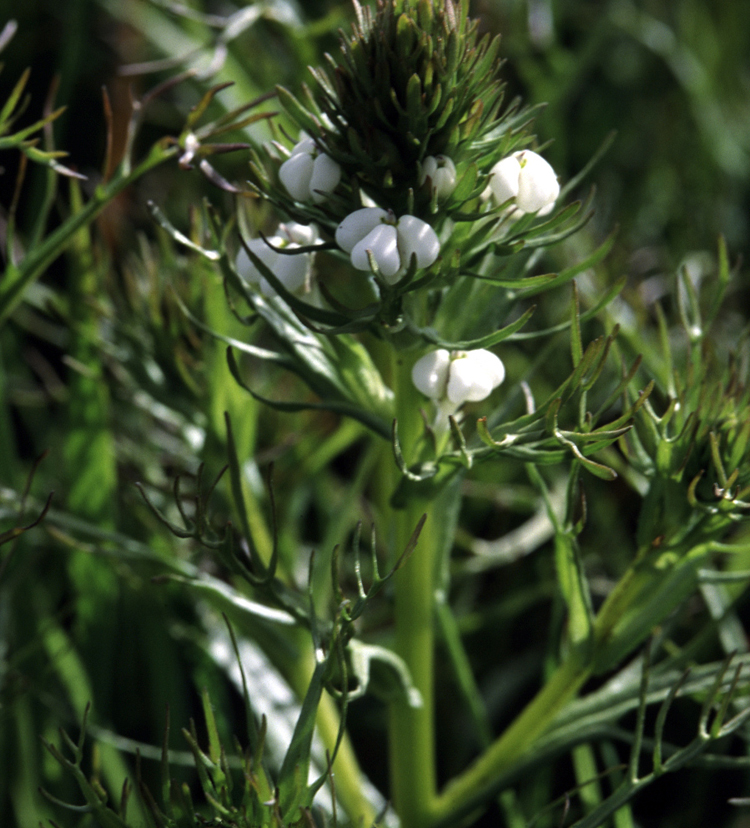

Scientific classification
- Kingdom: Plantae
- Clade: Tracheophytes
- Clade: Angiosperms
- Clade: Eudicots
- Clade: Asterids
- Order: Lamiales
- Family: Orobanchaceae
- Genus: Triphysaria
- Species: T. versicolor

Binomial name
- Triphysaria versicolor Fisch. & C.A.Mey.

= Triphysaria versicolor =

Species of flowering plant

Triphysaria versicolor is a species of flowering plant in the family Orobanchaceae known by the common name yellowbeak owl's-clover.

It is native to the west coast of North America from British Columbia to central California, where it grows in grassland habitat.

== Description ==
Triphysaria versicolor is an annual herb producing a green or yellowish stem up to about 60 centimeters in maximum height. Like many species in its family it is a facultative root parasite on other plants, attaching to their roots via haustoria to tap nutrients. The leaves are up to 8 centimeters long and are divided into a few narrow, pointed lobes.

The inflorescence is a dense spike of flowers. Each flower has a white corolla 1 or 2 centimeters long with a beaklike, yellow-tinged upper lip and a wider lower lip which is divided into three pouches. The lower lip may have purple spots underneath.
