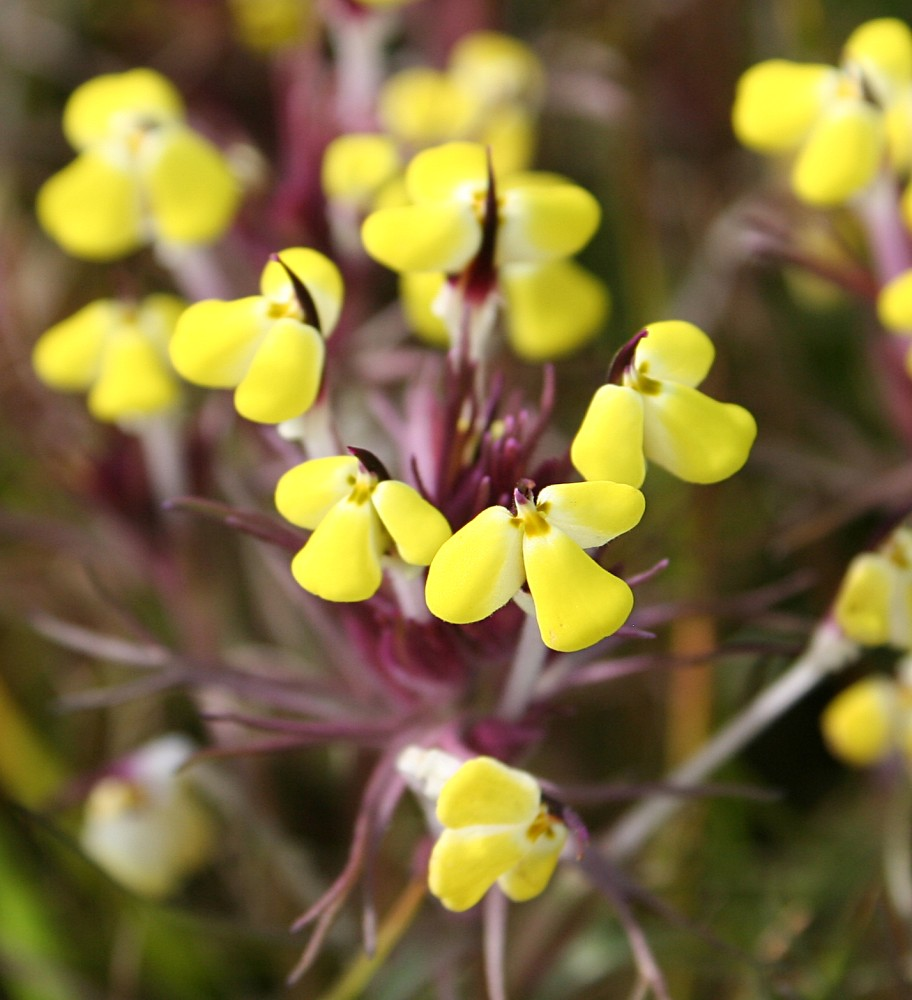
- Triphysaria eriantha

Scientific classification
- Kingdom: Plantae
- Clade: Tracheophytes
- Clade: Angiosperms
- Clade: Eudicots
- Clade: Asterids
- Order: Lamiales
- Family: Orobanchaceae
- Tribe: Pedicularideae
- Genus: Triphysaria; Fisch. & C.A. Mey.

Species
- 5, see text

= Triphysaria =

Genus of flowering plants in the broomrape family

Triphysaria is a genus of five plants in the family Orobanchaceae, commonly known as owl's-clovers. This genus is closely related to the genera Castilleja and Orthocarpus. Triphysaria species are native to western North America, including one species that is endemic to California.

== Description ==
These plants, like those in many other genera of the family, are facultative hemiparasites on other plants. They produce haustoria that tap into the roots of other plants to extract some of the nutrients they need.

The plants bear spike inflorescences of pouched, folded flowers that have lips shaped like the beak of an owl.

While the plants contain their own chlorophyll and are able to undergo photosynthesis, this process is limited. Without host plants, the species cannot flourish as greatly.

== Species ==
- Triphysaria eriantha – johnny-tuck, butter-and-eggs
- Triphysaria floribunda – San Francisco owl's-clover [California endemic]
- Triphysaria micrantha – purplebeak owl's-clover
- Triphysaria pusilla – dwarf owl's-clover
- Triphysaria versicolor – yellowbeak owl's-clover
