= Yorkville, California =

Unincorporated community in California, United States

Yorkville
- Unincorporated community
- Location in California
- Coordinates: 38°53′53″N 123°12′52″W
- Country: United States
- State: California
- County: Mendocino
- Elevation: 922 ft (281 m)
- ZIP Code: 95494

Yorkville is an unincorporated community in Mendocino County, California, United States. It is located 7.5 miles (12 km) southwest of Hopland, at an elevation of 922 feet (281 m).

The original townsite was approximately 3 miles (4.8 km) northwest of the present site at 38°54′50″N 123°15′40″W. The Yorkville post office opened in 1868 and moved to the new site with the town in 1937. "The Late Pomo or Ma-cu-maks of the present day Yorkville area spoke the central Pomo language."

The name honors R.H. York, the town's founder.

The Yorkville Highlands AVA was established in 1998. The Galbreath Wildlands Preserve, which is owned and managed by Sonoma State University as an educational site, is located nearby.

== See also ==
- Yorkville Highlands AVA
