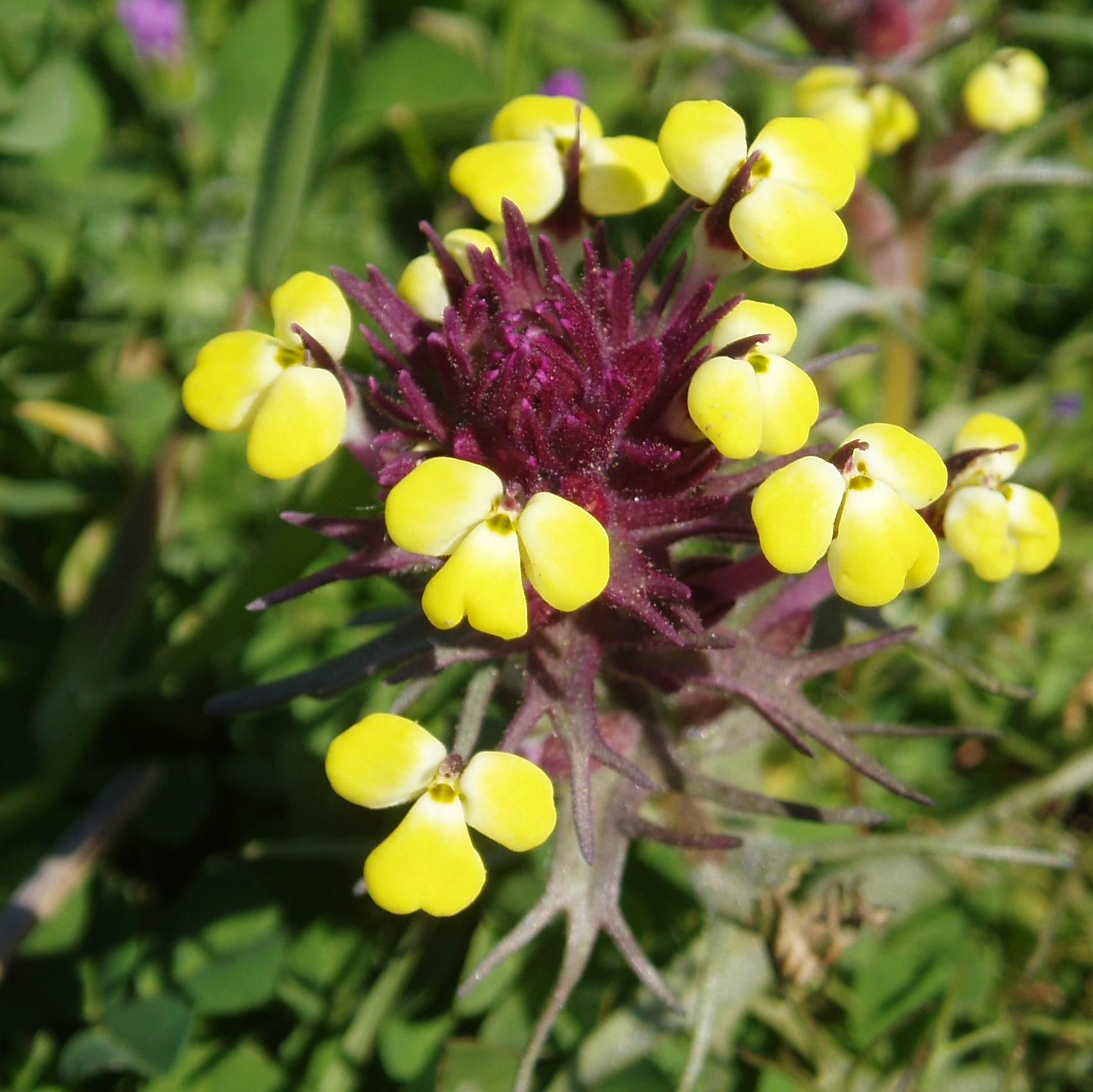

Scientific classification
- Kingdom: Plantae
- Clade: Tracheophytes
- Clade: Angiosperms
- Clade: Eudicots
- Clade: Asterids
- Order: Lamiales
- Family: Orobanchaceae
- Genus: Triphysaria
- Species: T. eriantha

Binomial name
- Triphysaria eriantha (Benth.) T.I.Chuang & Heckard

= Triphysaria eriantha =

Species of flowering plant

Triphysaria eriantha is a species of flowering plant in the family Orobanchaceae, known by the common names johnny-tuck and butter-and-eggs.

It is native to California and southwestern Oregon, where it grows in many types of habitats including chaparral, becoming quite common in some areas.

== Description ==
Triphysaria eriantha is an annual herb producing a hairy purple stem up to about 35 centimeters in maximum height. Like many species in its family, it is a facultative root parasite on other plants, attaching to their roots via haustoria to tap nutrients. Its green or purplish leaves are up to 5 centimeters long and are divided into a few narrow, pointed lobes.

The inflorescence is a spike of flowers. Each flower has a very thin, narrow upper lip which is purple in color, and a wide lower lip, which is divided into three pouches. The color of the pouches depends on the subspecies: the common ssp. eriantha has white and bright yellow pouches, and the less common coastal subsp. rosea has white pouches tinged with pink.

== Gallery ==
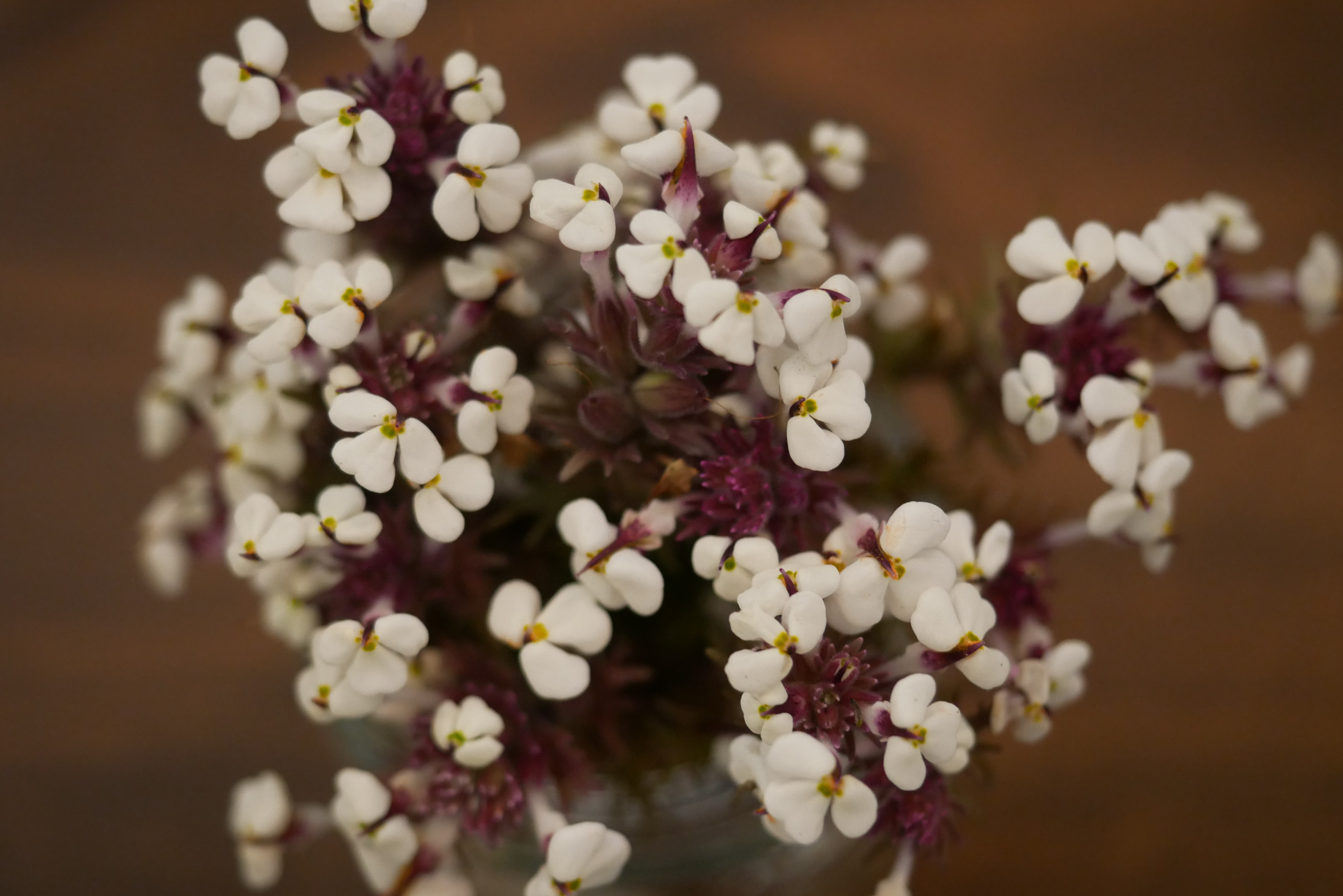
Pink butter-and-eggs

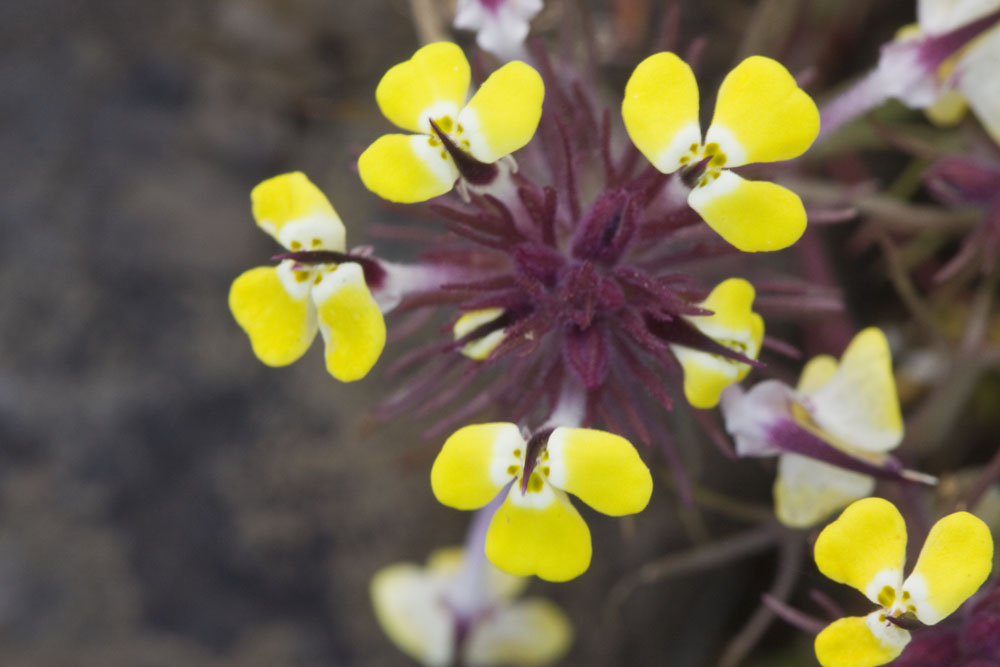
Triphysaria eriantha

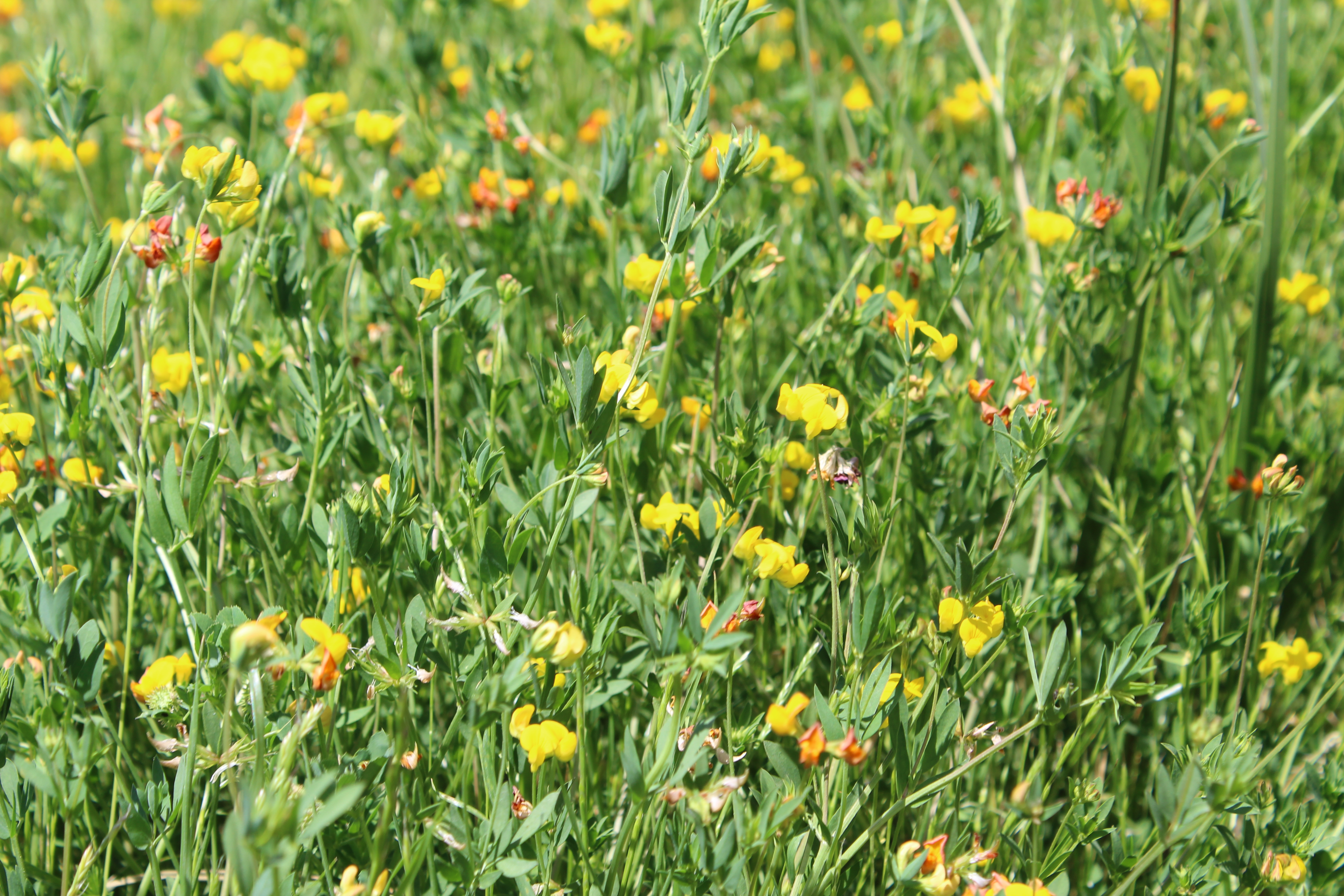
Triphysaria eriantha in vernal pool
