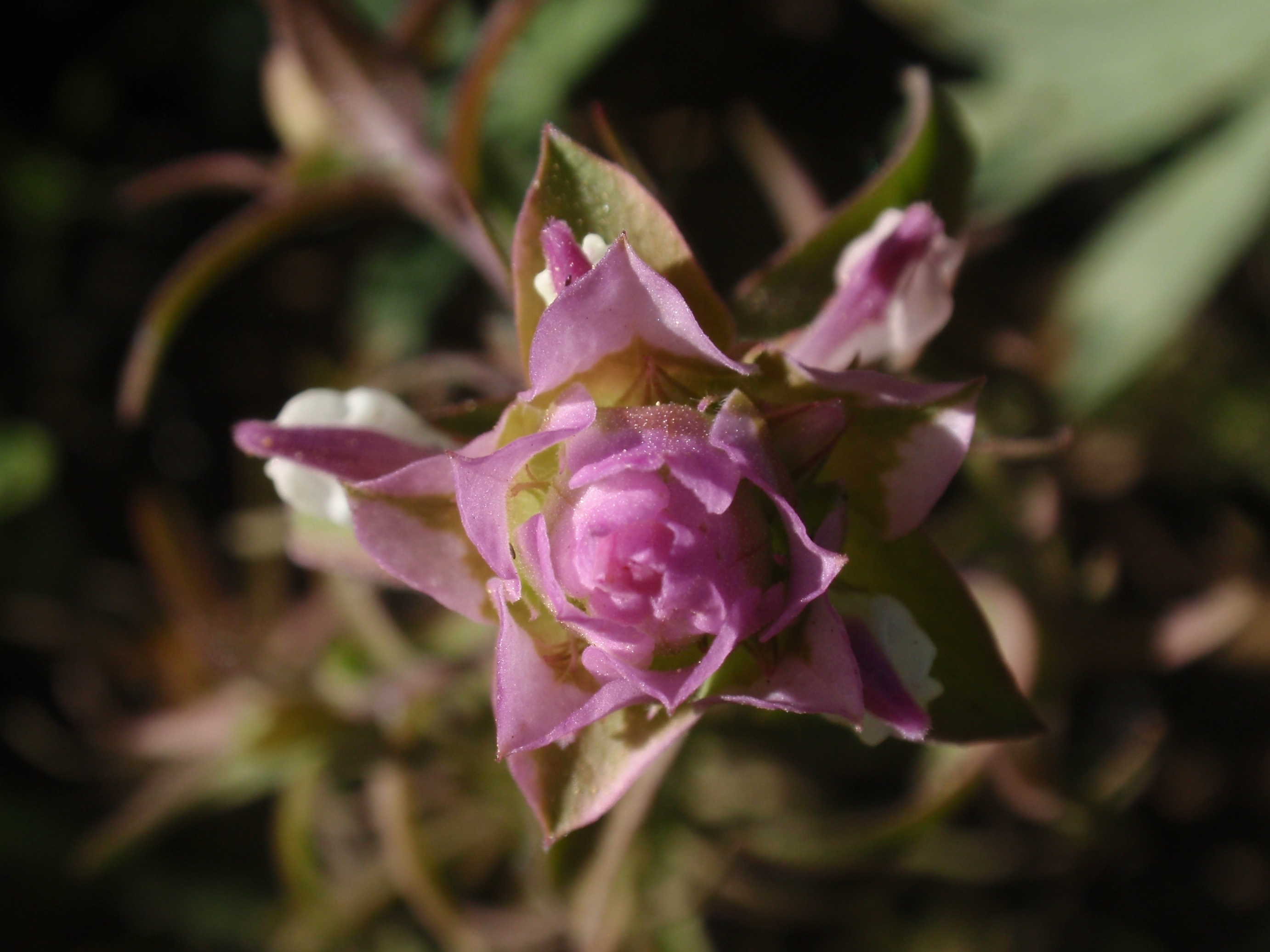

Scientific classification
- Kingdom: Plantae
- Clade: Tracheophytes
- Clade: Angiosperms
- Clade: Eudicots
- Clade: Asterids
- Order: Lamiales
- Family: Orobanchaceae
- Genus: Orthocarpus
- Species: O. imbricatus

Binomial name
- Orthocarpus imbricatus Torr. ex. S.Watson

= Orthocarpus imbricatus =

Species of flowering plant

Orthocarpus imbricatus is a species of flowering plant in the broomrape family known by the common name mountain owl's-clover. It is native to western North America from British Columbia to northern California, where it grows in meadows and other mountain habitat.

== Description ==
It is an annual herb producing a slender, hairy green stem up to about 35 centimeters tall. The lance-shaped leaves are up to 5 centimeters long. The inflorescence is a dense cylindrical spike of wide netted bracts with pinkish tips. The flowers just barely emerge from between the bracts. Each flower is about a centimeter long, its narrow, hooked, beaklike upper lip pink and its expanded, pouched lower lip yellowish.
