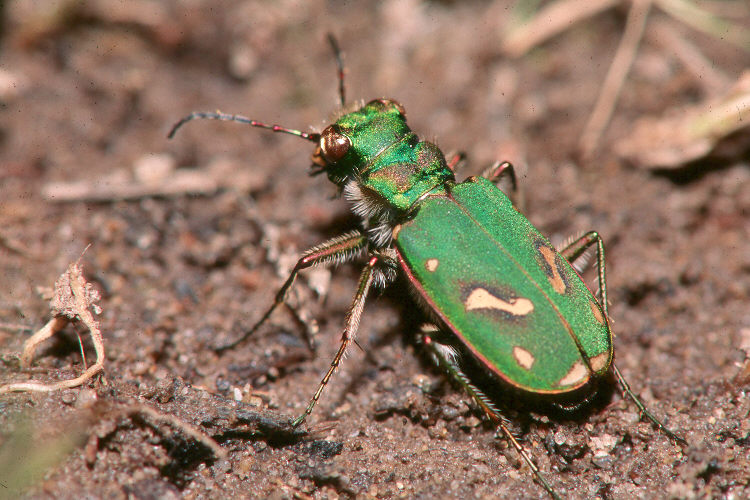

Conservation status
- Critically Imperiled (NatureServe)

- Endangered (ESA)

Scientific classification
- Kingdom: Animalia
- Phylum: Arthropoda
- Class: Insecta
- Order: Coleoptera
- Suborder: Adephaga
- Family: Cicindelidae
- Genus: Cicindela
- Species: C. ohlone

Binomial name
- Cicindela ohlone Freitag & Kavanaugh, 1993
- Natural range of Cicindela ohlone, estimated with the iNaturalist Geomodel

= Cicindela ohlone =

Ohlone tiger beetle

Species of beetle

Cicindela ohlone, the Ohlone tiger beetle, is endemic to California. It was discovered in 1987 and named and described in 1993. C. ohlone is most closely related to Cicindela purpurea.

Cicindela ohlone ranges in length from 9 1/2 to 12 1/2 millimetres (0.37 to 0.49 in) with the females at the higher end of the range. The body is a bright, sericate green with bronze tints on the dorsum and the elytra. C. ohlone differs from other purpurea in that it has a larger body size, different genital morphology and different seasonal activity cycle.

== Habitat ==
Cicindela ohlone is endemic to Santa Cruz County, California which is the southernmost habitat of tiger beetles in the purpurea group. They are allopatric relative to other purpurea. C. ohlone are found on coastal terraces in remnant patches of native California coastal prairie grasslands with poorly drained clay or sandy clay over Santa Cruz mudstone. This soil becomes hard packed in late spring and summer which is an important feature for the activities of the beetle. Foraging, mating, and egg-laying often occur in these open spaces.

== Ecology ==
Cicindela ohlone complete their life cycle in two years, or in rare cases, one year. After mating and subsequent fertilization, the female tiger beetle deposits the egg several millimeters under the ground. The egg hatches into a larva that creates a burrow. The larva will feed on prey that pass by the burrow until it forms a pupa and finally emerges as an adult.

Cicindela ohlone are predators and feed on many different species of arthropods. C. ohlone capture prey either in active chases with brief intermittent pauses or by waiting in shady areas and grabbing prey with their mandibles as it approaches. The primary predators of tiger beetles are birds, lizards and other insects; however it is not yet known if C. ohlone have these same predators. To avoid becoming prey the beetle escapes by quick flights or running aided by the beetle's exceptional vision. Predation has not yet been studied for C. ohlone larvae, but tiger beetle larvae are hunted by ground-foraging woodpeckers, ants, and wasps. Their most important predators are parasitoid wasps and flies that lay their eggs in the beetle larva. The tiger beetle larva is then consumed by the wasp or fly larvae, which then emerge from the burrow as adults.

Cicindela ohlone is active during the late winter and spring. This differs from all other tiger beetles species who are active in summer or in spring and fall.

== Endangered species listing ==
On October 3, 2001, C. ohlone was registered as an endangered species under the Endangered Species Act of 1973. The following factors were listed as threats to the C. ohlone: habitat fragmentation and destruction due to urban development, habitat degradation from invasion of nonnative vegetation, and vulnerability to local extirpation from random events. C. ohlone habitat is restricted to remnant patches of native grasslands on coastal terraces over a firm level substrate. This type of site is also great for building homes with views of the Pacific Ocean. For this reason much of the habitat of the C. ohlone has already been developed or is in danger of being developed. C. ohlone habitat has been affected by encroachment of nonnative vegetation which create a dense, shady over-story. Low, spare vegetation with open spaces is required for the beetle to forage and lay eggs. According to the Fish and Wildlife Service, "without management efforts to reduce and control vegetation encroachment by nonnative species, C. ohlone will likely decline and may become extirpated in all of the locations where the species is known presently" . Invasion of nonnative vegetation also changes the populations of beetle predators, prey and parasites.

Unrestricted collecting, recreational use of habitat, and pesticides were cited as threats. Tiger beetles are highly sought after by collectors because they are attractive and exhibit great diversity in color and markings from species to species. Paths used by hikers and mountain bikers are used by the beetle in their open space activities, such as attacking prey and mating. Burrows built by C. ohlone can be crushed by traffic on these paths, as can the beetles themselves. Pesticides used by local land owners can be transported by air or water and kill the beetles unintentionally. The Fish and Wildlife Service determined that the species is in danger “throughout all or a significant portion of its range” and listed C. ohlone for protection under the Endangered Species Act.

== Conservation efforts ==
One of the populations of C. ohlone is located in the grassland patch of Marshall field in the upper campus of the University of California, Santa Cruz. Trails through the patch serve as open space needed by C. ohlone, but are also used by mountain bikers. During C. ohlone mating season temporary fences have been put up to block off the trails to protect the beetles since 2003 on nearby California State Parks' property. On both UC Santa Cruz and State Parks' property, controlled burns in this area have reduced the density of vegetation in an effort to provide better suited habitat for C. ohlone. Additionally, the City of Santa Cruz has restored cattle grazing on its Moore Creek Preserve; the rancher overseeing the cattle has adjusted grazing in such a way to restore Ohlone tiger beetle habitat. Effects of these efforts are not well known, though the State Parks' and Santa Cruz City Moore Creek Greenbelt populations of the species has been maintained whereas most other populations have declined. More research will need to be done to effectively protect C. ohlone.

Despite its legal protection, landowners continue to threaten the species. One landowner apparently maliciously destroyed habitat after being told about sensitive locations of the species' burrows. Another landowner purposefully removed cattle grazing in order to reduce habitat quality with the hope of more readily developing their land. Still another landowner has allowed trespass and habitat destruction. Finally, a private landowner destroyed acres of core habitat by developing a vineyard just before the species was listed.

Even conservation lands owners have added to the species' decline: one park agency spread gravel extensively over larval habitat of the species in an effort to 'improve' trails; still another agency removed horse grazing, re-routed public access, and stopped beneficial management practices, extirpating this important population.

Even though all of the aforementioned detrimental activities have been well documented and dutifully reported to regulatory agencies, no agency has taken enforcement action against the perpetrators, leading to grave doubts if this species can be saved from extinction.
