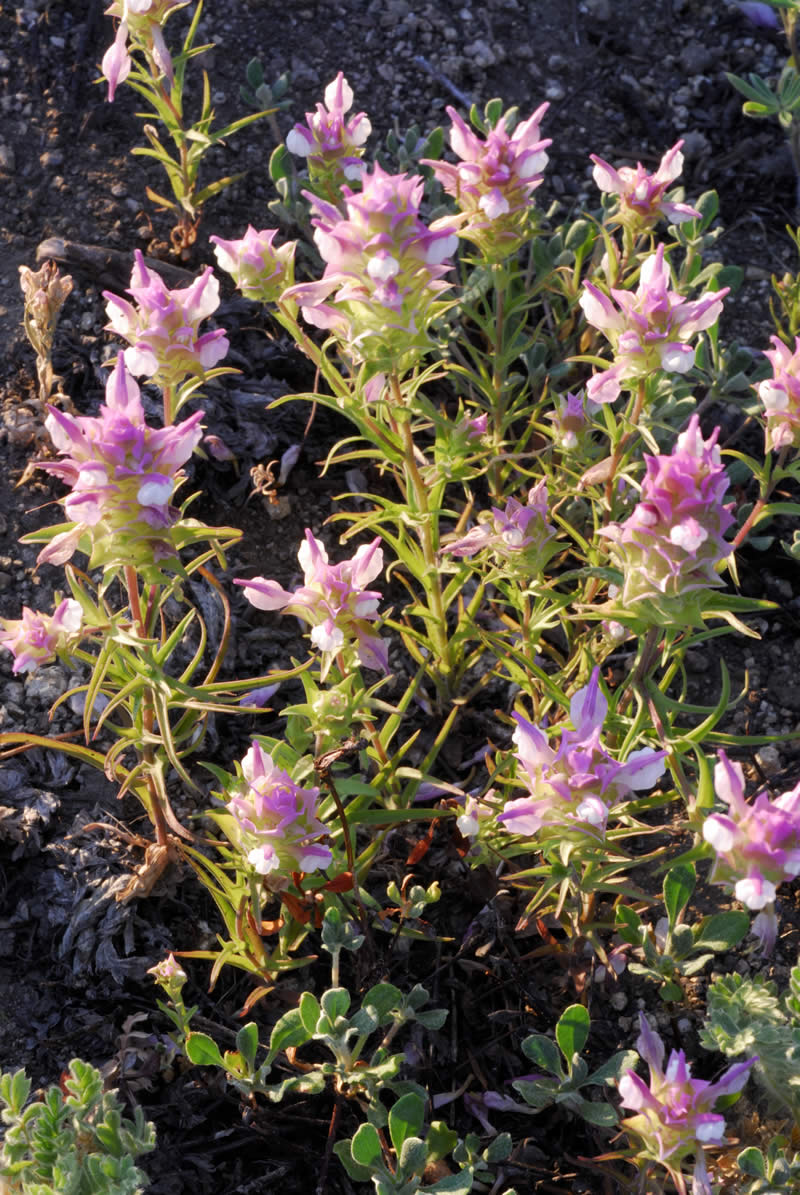

Scientific classification
- Kingdom: Plantae
- Clade: Tracheophytes
- Clade: Angiosperms
- Clade: Eudicots
- Clade: Asterids
- Order: Lamiales
- Family: Orobanchaceae
- Genus: Orthocarpus
- Species: O. cuspidatus

Binomial name
- Orthocarpus cuspidatus Greene

= Orthocarpus cuspidatus =

Species of flowering plant

Orthocarpus cuspidatus is a species of flowering plant in the broomrape family known by the common names Copeland's owl's clover, Siskiyou Mountains orthocarpus, and toothed owl's-clover. It is native to mountain and plateau habitat in Oregon, California, and Nevada. It is an annual herb producing a slender, glandular, hairy, purple-green stem up to about 40 centimeters tall. The narrow leaves are up to 5 centimeters long, the upper ones deeply divided into three linear lobes. The inflorescence is a dense cylindrical spike of wide, oval green bracts with pinkish points. The flowers emerge from between the bracts. Each purple-pink flower is fuzzy in texture and club-shaped, the lower lip an expanded pouch and the upper lip a narrow, straight beak.
