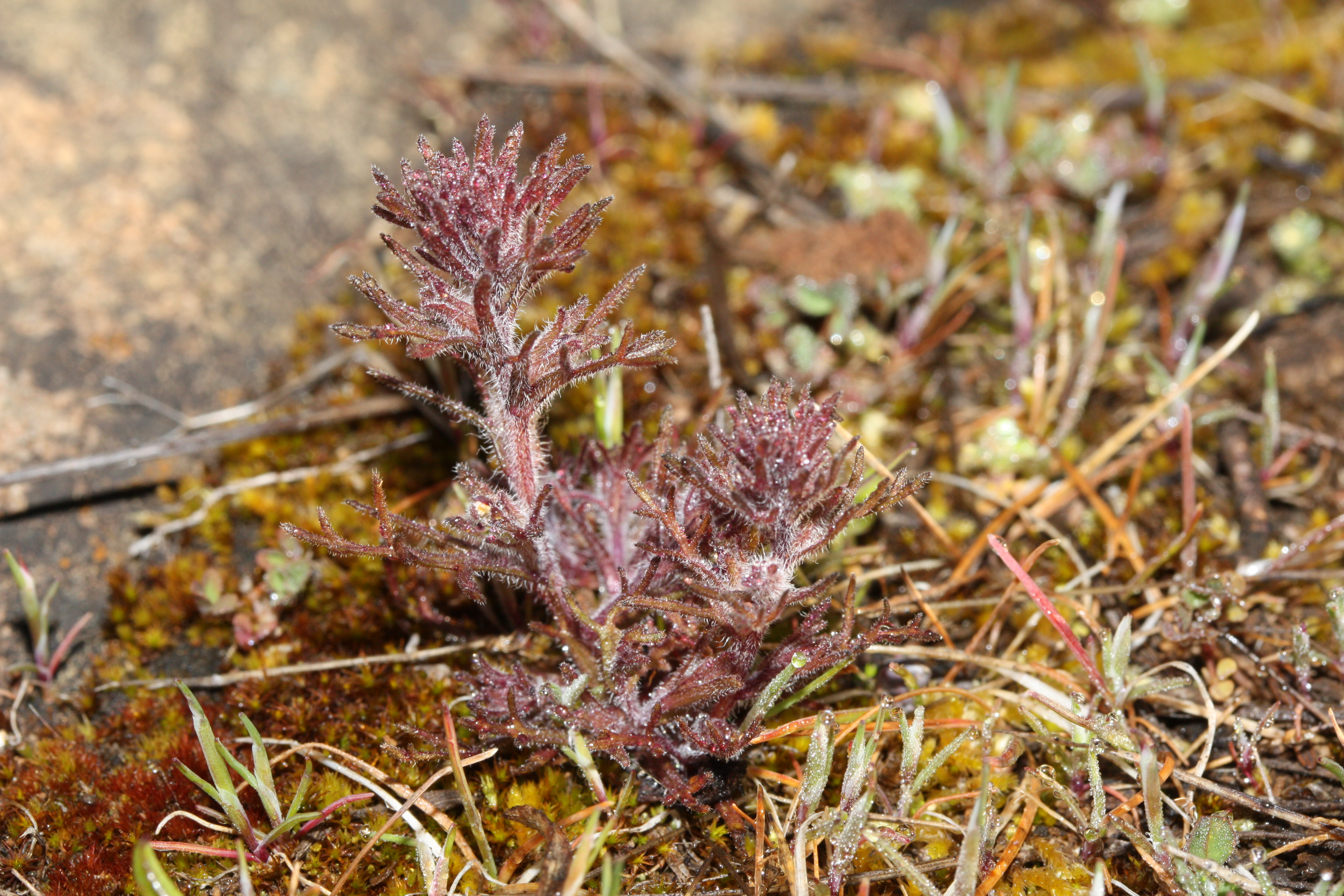

Scientific classification
- Kingdom: Plantae
- Clade: Tracheophytes
- Clade: Angiosperms
- Clade: Eudicots
- Clade: Asterids
- Order: Lamiales
- Family: Orobanchaceae
- Genus: Triphysaria
- Species: T. pusilla

Binomial name
- Triphysaria pusilla (Benth.) T.I.Chuang & Heckard

= Triphysaria pusilla =

Species of flowering plant

Triphysaria pusilla is a species of flowering plant in the family Orobanchaceae known by the common name dwarf owl's-clover.

The plant is native to the west coast of North America from British Columbia to central California from the California Coast Ranges across to the Sierra Nevada. It grows in moist open habitat such as spring-fed grasslands.

== Description ==
Triphysaria pusilla is an annual herb producing a hairy brownish or purple-colored, multi-branched stem up to about 20 centimeters in maximum height. Like many species in its family, it is a facultative hemiparasite on other plants, attaching to their roots via haustoria to tap nutrients and water.

Its leaves are greenish, red or purple because of the anthocyanin pigments that the plants produce. They are up to 3 centimeters long and divided into a few narrow, pointed lobes.

The inflorescence is a spike of minute, tubular flowers. Each flower has a beak-like yellow or purple upper lip and a wider lower lip which is divided into three tiny yellow or purple pouches. To increase the chances of cross pollination, at any point of time during the flowering season, only three flowers will have matured on each individual plant. Two of these flowers mature their anthers first while the remaining flower matures its stigma.

== Pollination ==
It is hypothesized that ants are the preferred pollinator of this species.

== Parasitism ==
Triphysaria pusilla is dependent on a host for survival. They are considered a generalist parasite, living off the nutrients of a variety of hosts that are non-specific. It is able to attack multiple hosts, simultaneously using the root system.
