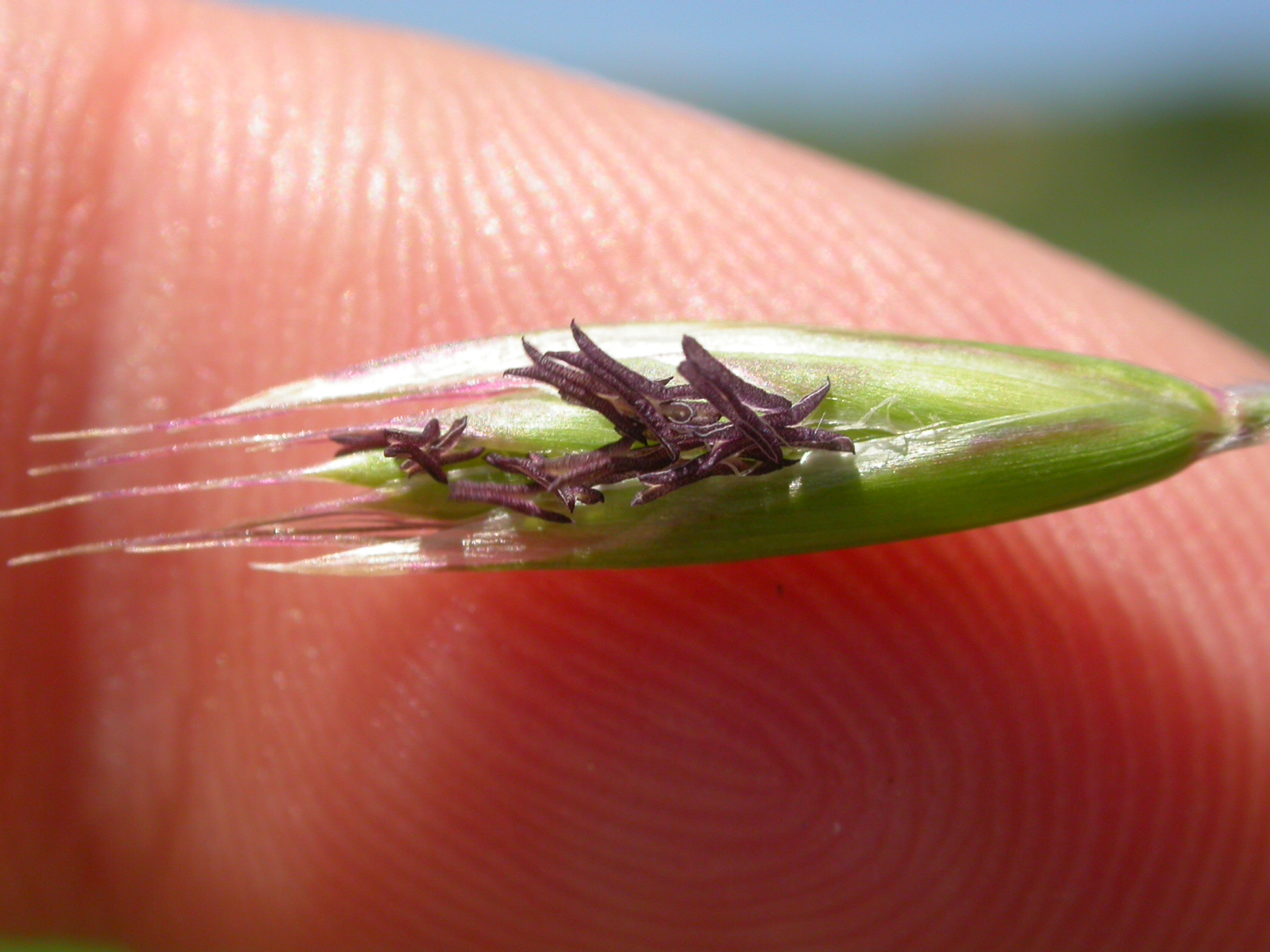

Scientific classification
- Kingdom: Plantae
- Clade: Tracheophytes
- Clade: Angiosperms
- Clade: Monocots
- Clade: Commelinids
- Order: Poales
- Family: Poaceae
- Genus: Danthonia
- Species: D. californica

Binomial name
- Danthonia californica Bolander

Synonyms
- Danthonia americana

= Danthonia californica =

Species of grass

Danthonia californica is a species of grass known by the common name California oatgrass. This plant is native to two separate regions of the Americas, western North America from California to Saskatchewan, and Chile.

== Description ==
Danthonia californica is a clumping erect perennial bunch grass with stems approaching a meter (3 feet) in height at maximum. The leaves are flat and short and may be hairy or hairless. The inflorescence holds one or more spikelets, each spikelet holding up to eight florets. This grass grows best in moist areas, generally in thin forests and meadows. Typical native grass associates in the far western North American coastal prairies are Festuca idahoensis, Deschampsia caespitosa, and Nassella pulchra.

== See also ==
- California coastal prairie
- Native grasses of California

== Notes ==
- C. Michael Hogan. 2009. "Purple Needlegrass (Nassella pulchra)" Globaltwitcher.com, ed. N. Stromberg
- Jepson Manual. 1993. Jepson Manual Treatment: Danthonia californica
