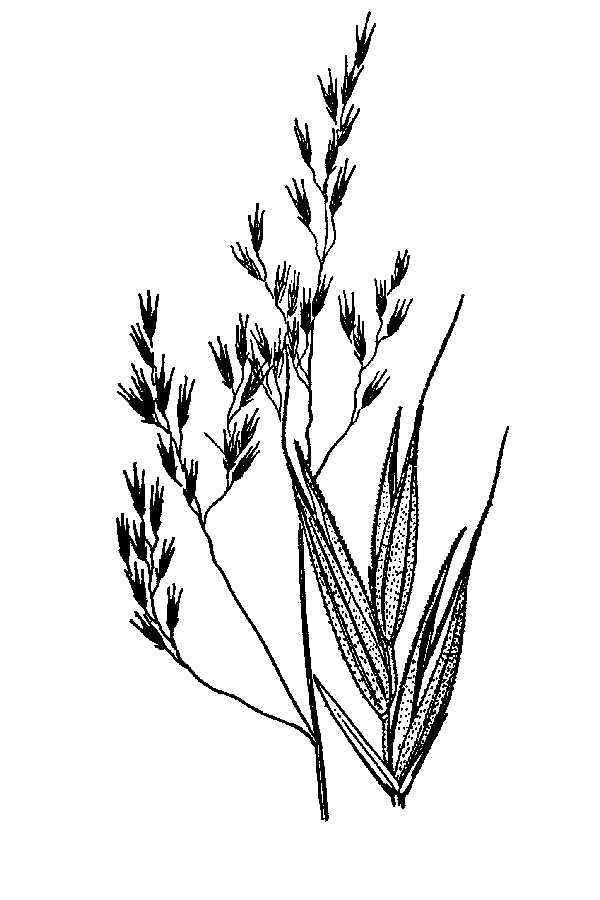

Scientific classification
- Kingdom: Plantae
- Clade: Tracheophytes
- Clade: Angiosperms
- Clade: Monocots
- Clade: Commelinids
- Order: Poales
- Family: Poaceae
- Subfamily: Pooideae
- Genus: Festuca
- Species: F. elmeri

Binomial name
- Festuca elmeri Scribn. & Merr.

= Festuca elmeri =

Species of flowering plant

Festuca elmeri is a species of grass known by the common names coast fescue and Elmer's fescue. It is a bunchgrass native to the US states of California and Oregon, where it often grows in wet, shady areas in coastal counties.

== Description ==
This fescue grows in thin bunches with erect stems reaching up to one meter in height. The leaves are somewhat hairy and 10 to 40 centimeters long. The drooping inflorescence holds spikelets which are each about a centimeter long and have light-colored, hairlike awns.
