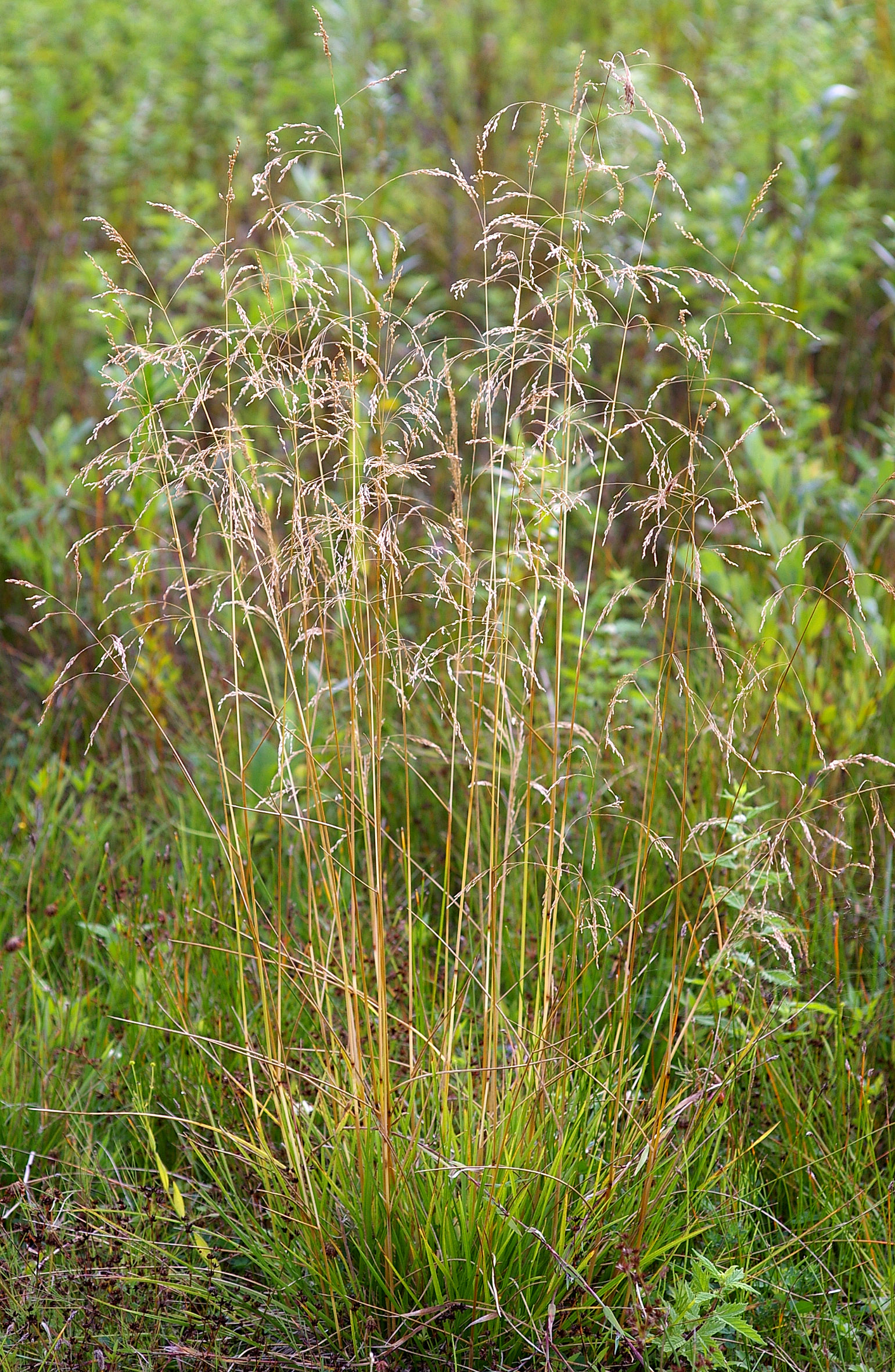

Scientific classification
- Kingdom: Plantae
- Clade: Tracheophytes
- Clade: Angiosperms
- Clade: Monocots
- Clade: Commelinids
- Order: Poales
- Family: Poaceae
- Subfamily: Pooideae
- Genus: Deschampsia
- Species: D. cespitosa

Binomial name
- Deschampsia cespitosa (L.) P.Beauv.

Synonyms
- Deschampsia caespitosa

= Deschampsia cespitosa =

Species of flowering plant

Deschampsia cespitosa, commonly known as tufted hairgrass or tussock grass, is a perennial tufted plant in the grass family Poaceae. The distribution of this species is widespread, with it being native to North America, Central Africa, eastern Australia, New Zealand, and Eurasia and being introduced to South Africa, South Australia and South America.

== Description ==
A distinguishing feature is the upper surface of the leaf blade which feels rough and can cut in one direction, but is smooth in the opposite direction. The dark green upper sides of the leaves are deeply grooved.

It can grow to 4.5 ft (1.4 m) tall, and has a long, narrow, pointed ligule. It flowers from June until August.

== Habitat and ecology ==
It can be found on all types of grassland, although it prefers poorly drained soil. It forms a major component of the British NVC community MG9 - Holcus lanatus to Deschampsia cespitosa mesotrophic grasslands. It can exist up to altitudes of 4000 ft. Typical native grass associates in the western North American coastal prairies, such as the California coastal prairie, are Festuca californica, Festuca idahoensis, Danthonia californica, and Nassella pulchra.

It is a larval host to the Juba skipper (Hesperia juba) and the umber skipper (Lon melane).

== Subspecies ==
- Deschampsia cespitosa subsp. cespitosa (synonyms: Deschampsia bottnica (Wahlenb.) Trin.; Deschampsia littoralis (Gaudin) Reut.)

== Horticulture ==
The species is cultivated as an ornamental garden plant, and numerous cultivars are available. The cultivars 'Goldschleier' and 'Goldtau' have gained the Royal Horticultural Society's Award of Garden Merit.

== Gallery ==
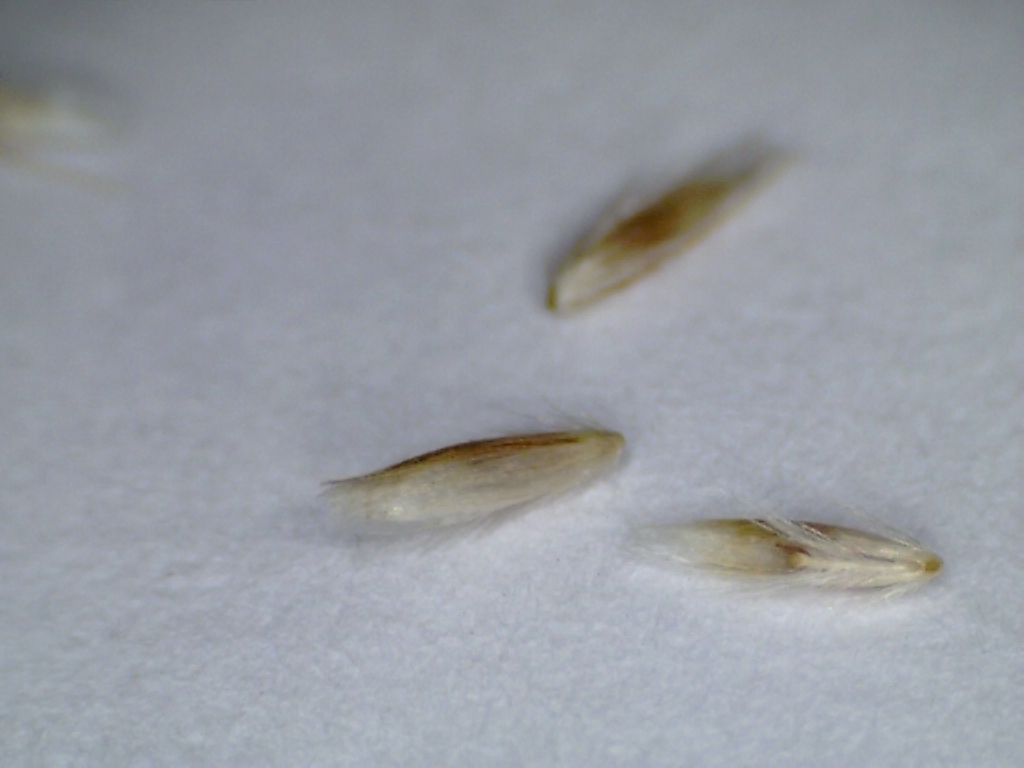
Seed

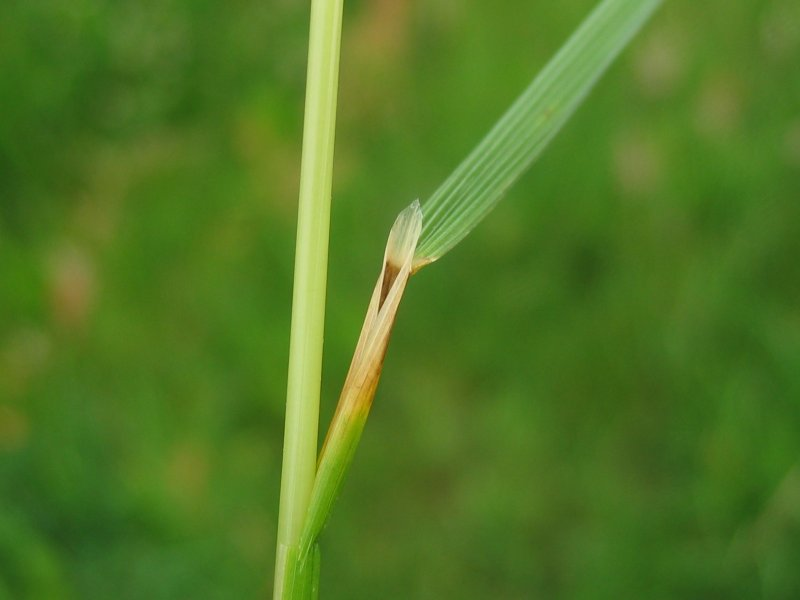
Ligule is long and pointed

== See also ==
- Ornamental grass
