= Trifolium buckwestiorum =

Conservation status
- Imperiled (NatureServe)

Scientific classification
- Kingdom: Plantae
- Clade: Embryophytes
- Clade: Tracheophytes
- Clade: Angiosperms
- Clade: Eudicots
- Clade: Rosids
- Order: Fabales
- Family: Fabaceae
- Subfamily: Faboideae
- Genus: Trifolium
- Species: T. buckwestiorum

Binomial name
- Trifolium buckwestiorum Isely

Species of flowering plant

Trifolium buckwestiorum is a rare species of clover known by the common name Santa Cruz clover.

== Description ==
It is an annual herb growing upright or decumbent in form, with hairless green or reddish herbage. The leaves are made up of finely toothed, oval shaped leaflets up to 1.5 centimeters (1/2 in) long and bristle-tipped stipules.

The inflorescence is a head of flowers roughly a centimeter wide, the flowers held in a bowl-like involucre of wide, jagged-toothed bracts. Each flower has a calyx of sepals that narrow into fine bristles and a pink corolla under 1 cm long.

== Distribution and habitat ==
It is endemic to California, where it is known from nine or ten small occurrences in Monterey, Santa Cruz, and Sonoma Counties. It may also occur in San Mateo, Santa Clara, and Mendocino Counties, but its populations are very small and easily disturbed by threats such as vehicles, development, and feral pig activity.

It grows in forest, woodland, and coastal prairie habitat.
