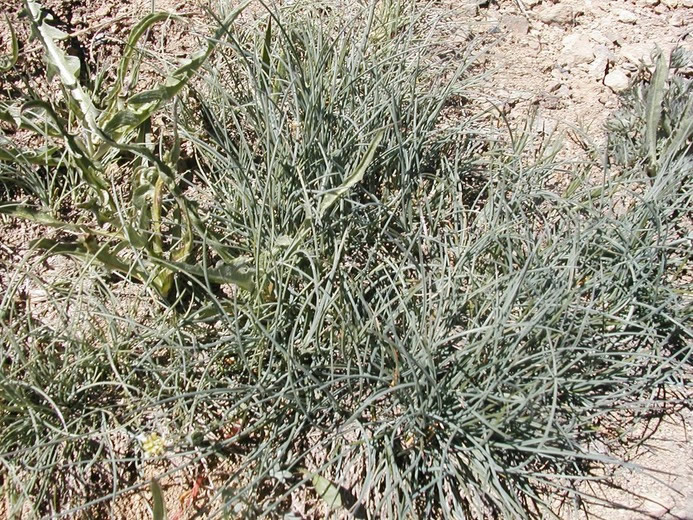

Scientific classification
- Kingdom: Plantae
- Clade: Tracheophytes
- Clade: Angiosperms
- Clade: Monocots
- Clade: Commelinids
- Order: Poales
- Family: Poaceae
- Subfamily: Pooideae
- Genus: Festuca
- Species: F. idahoensis

Binomial name
- Festuca idahoensis Elmer

Synonyms
- Festuca amethystina subvar. idahoensis (Elmer) St.-Yves "Festuca idahoensis" subspecies "roemeri"(Elmer) S. Aiken

= Festuca idahoensis =

Species of flowering plant

Festuca idahoensis is a species of grass known by the common names Idaho fescue and blue bunchgrass. It is native to western North America, where it is widespread and common. It can be found in many ecosystems, from shady forests to open plains grasslands.

== Description ==
This fescue is a densely clumping long-lived perennial bunch grass with stems from about 30 to 80 centimetres (12 to 31 1/2 inches) in height. The stiff, short, rolling leaves are mostly located near the base of the tuft. The inflorescence has hairy spikelets which produce large awned fruits. The root system is thick and penetrates deeply into the soil. The roots have symbiotic mycorrhizae. There are no rhizomes; the plant reproduces from seeds and from budding with tillers.

It is similar to, but generally taller and larger than, Poa secunda.

== Ecology ==
The species can grow in well-soiled areas along with ponderosa pine.

This is a nutritious and preferred forage grass for wild and domestic animals. Typical native grass associates in the far west coastal prairies are Danthonia californica, Deschampsia caespitosa and Nassella pulchra. It is a popular larval host, supporting Lindsey's skipper, sandhill skipper, Sonora skipper, woodland skipper, and western banded skipper caterpillars.

Festuca idahoensis subsp. Roemeri is a preferred host plant of many Castilleja flowers, including the rare Castelleja levisecta.

== Cultivation ==
Cultivars, such as "Siskiyou Blue," are produced in the horticulture industry for landscape design and garden use.

== Notes ==
- C. Michael Hogan. 2009. "Purple Needlegrass (Nassella pulchra)" Globaltwitcher.com, ed. N. Stromberg
- Jepson Manual. 1993. Jepson Manual Treatment: Festuca idahoensis
