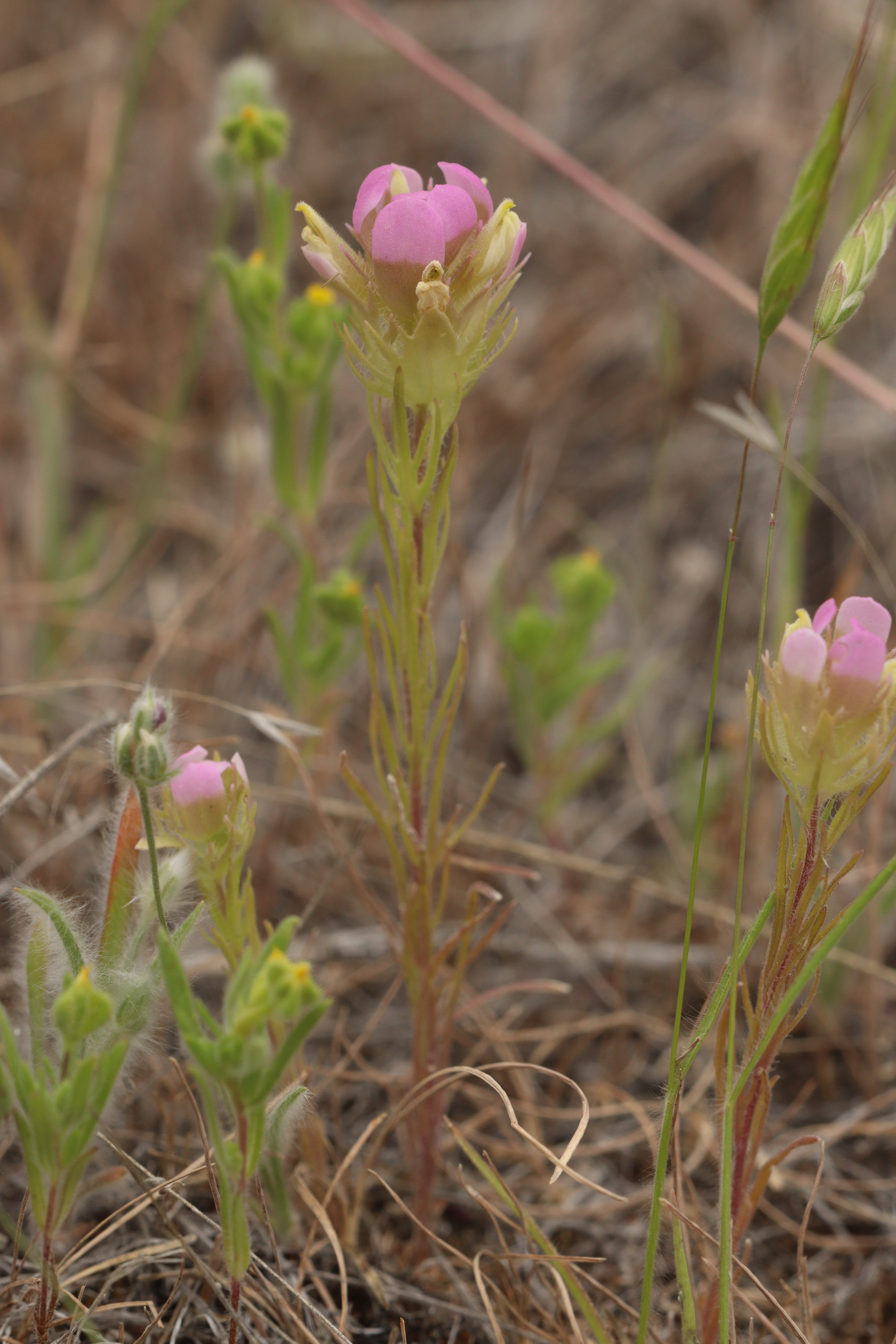
- Orthocarpus tenuifolius

Scientific classification
- Kingdom: Plantae
- Clade: Tracheophytes
- Clade: Angiosperms
- Clade: Eudicots
- Clade: Asterids
- Order: Lamiales
- Family: Orobanchaceae
- Genus: Orthocarpus; Nutt.

Species
- See text.

= Orthocarpus =

Genus of flowering plants in the broomrape family

Orthocarpus, or owl's-clover, is a genus of flowering plants in the family Orobanchaceae (broomrapes). They are native to North America. A number of species formerly included in Orthocarpus have been transferred to the genus Castilleja, which includes the plants commonly known as Indian paintbrush. Plants of the genus are generally less than 30 centimetres (1 ft) in height.

Like their close relatives in genus Castilleja, Orthocarpus are root hemiparasites, capable of photosynthesis but extracting water and mineral nutrients through attachment to the roots of host plants.

Some animal species such as the Edith's checkerspot butterfly use these plants as hosts during ovipositing.

== Species ==
As of March 2022, Plants of the World Online accepted the following species:

- Orthocarpus barbatus J.S.Cotton
- Orthocarpus bracteosus Benth.
- Orthocarpus cuspidatus Greene
- Orthocarpus holmgreniorum (T.I. Chuang & Heckard) L. M. Shultz & F. J. Smith
- Orthocarpus imbricatus Torr. ex S.Watson
- Orthocarpus luteus Nutt.
- Orthocarpus pachystachyus A.Gray
- Orthocarpus purpureoalbus A.Gray ex S.Watson
- Orthocarpus tenuifolius (Pursh) Benth.
- Orthocarpus tolmiei Hook. & Arn.
