= Lawrence Ray Heckard =

American botanist (1923–1991)

- Born: April 9, 1923; Long Beach, Washington, US
- Died: November 26, 1991 (aged 68)
- Education: Oregon State College; University of California, Berkeley
- Partner: Paul Silva
- Scientific career
- Thesis: Studies in the Phacelia magellicanica complex (Hydrophyllaceae), with particular reference to the California members (1955)
- Author abbrev. (botany): Heckard

Lawrence Ray Heckard (1923–1991) was an American botanist and curator of the Jepson Herbarium. He was an authority on the flora of California with a focus on the genus Phacelia.

== Biography ==
Heckard was born in Long Beach, Washington on April 9, 1923. After serving in World War II, he earned his bachelor's degree in horticulture at Oregon State College in 1948. He finished his doctorate from the University of California, Berkeley in 1955. While at UC Berkeley, Heckard met his life partner Paul Silva.

In 1960, Heckard was named assistant curator at the Jepson Herbarium. Here, he worked to revise The Jepson Manual. He also served as chairman to the American Society of Plant Taxonomists from 1961-1966, president of the California Botanical Society in 1971, and director of the California Native Plant Society.

Heckard died of AIDS-related causes on November 26, 1991. The 1993 revision of The Jepson Manual was dedicated to him.
