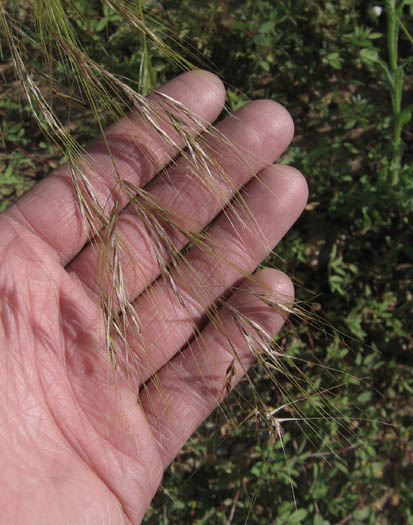

Conservation status
- Secure (NatureServe)

Scientific classification
- Kingdom: Plantae
- Clade: Tracheophytes
- Clade: Angiosperms
- Clade: Monocots
- Clade: Commelinids
- Order: Poales
- Family: Poaceae
- Subfamily: Pooideae
- Genus: Nassella
- Species: N. pulchra

Binomial name
- Nassella pulchra (Hitchc.) Barkworth

Synonyms
- Stipa pulchra Hitchc. (basionym)

= Nassella pulchra =

Species of grass

Nassella pulchra, basionym Stipa pulchra, is a species of grass known by the common names purple needlegrass and purple tussockgrass. It is native to the U.S. state of California, where it occurs throughout the coastal hills, valleys, and mountain ranges, as well as the Sacramento Valley and parts of the Sierra Nevada foothills, and Baja California.

It grows in many types of local habitat, including grassland, chaparral, and oak woodland. It grows well on clay and serpentine soils.

== Description ==
Nassella pulchra is a perennial bunch grass producing tufts of erect, unbranched stems up to 1 metre (3.3 ft) tall. The extensive root system can reach 20 feet (6.1 m) deep into the soil, making the grass more tolerant of drought.

The open, nodding inflorescence is up to 60 centimeters long and has many branches bearing Spikelets.

The plant produces copious seed, up to 227 pounds per acre in dense stands. The pointed fruit is purple-tinged when young and has an awn up to 10 centimeters long which is twisted and bent twice. The shape of the seed helps it self-bury.

== Uses ==
This grass is the preferred material used by the California Indian basket weavers for teaching the art of basket weaving.

== State grass ==
Purple needlegrass became the California state grass in 2004. It is considered a symbol of the state because it is viewed by some as one of the most widespread native California grasses, it supported Native American groups as well as Mexican ranchers, and it helps suppress invasive plant species and support native oaks.

== Ecology ==
In addition to supporting native oaks, it supports common branded skipper and Uncas skipper caterpillars.

== See also ==
- List of California native plants § Selected grasses
- Native grasses of California
