= List of Festuca species =

The following species in the grass genus Festuca, the fescues, are accepted by Plants of the World Online as of 2024. This genus together with the ryegrass genus Lolium form the Festuca–Lolium complex known for its frequent hybridization, and which is further complicated by the presence of a fine-leaved fescue clade within Festuca that appears to be sister to a clade consisting of Lolium and broad-leaved Festuca species.

== A ==
- Festuca abyssinica A.Rich.
- Festuca acamptophylla (St.-Yves) E.B.Alexeev
- Festuca acanthophylla É.Desv.
- Festuca achtarovii Velchev & P.Vassil.
- Festuca actae Connor
- Festuca actiophyta (M.I.Gut.) Izco & Rivas Mart.
- Festuca acuminata Gaudin
- Festuca adamovicii (St.-Yves) Markgr.-Dann.
- Festuca adanensis Markgr.-Dann.
- Festuca afghanica Bor
- Festuca aguana E.B.Alexeev
- Festuca agustini Linding.
- Festuca airoides Lam.
- Festuca akhanii Tzvelev
- Festuca alaica Drobow
- Festuca alatavica (St.-Yves) Roshev.
- Festuca albensis M.Toman
- Festuca albomontana Aykurt, Çıngay, Sümbül & Cabi
- Festuca alexeenkoi E.B.Alexeev
- Festuca alfrediana Foggi & Signorini
- Festuca algeriensis Trab.
- Festuca aloha Catalán, Soreng & P.M.Peterson
- Festuca alopecuros Schousb.
- Festuca alpestris Roem. & Schult.
- Festuca alpina Suter
- Festuca altaica Trin.
- Festuca altissima All.
- Festuca altopyrenaica Fuente & Ortúñez
- Festuca ambigua Le Gall
- Festuca amblyodes V.I.Krecz. & Bobrov
- Festuca amethystina L.
- Festuca ampla Hack.
- Festuca amplissima Rupr. ex Galeotti
- Festuca amurensis E.B.Alexeev
- Festuca anatolica Markgr.-Dann.
- Festuca ancachsana E.B.Alexeev
- Festuca andicola Kunth
- Festuca antucensis (Trin.) Steud.
- Festuca apuanica Markgr.-Dann.
- Festuca aragonensis (Willk.) Fuente & Ortúñez
- Festuca arenaria Osbeck
- Festuca arenicola (Prodan) Soó
- Festuca argentina (Speg.) Parodi
- Festuca argentinensis (St.-Yves) Türpe
- Festuca arizonica Vasey
- Festuca armoricana Kerguélen
- Festuca artvinensis Markgr.-Dann.
- Festuca arvernensis Auquier, Kerguélen & Markgr.-Dann.
- Festuca asperella E.B.Alexeev
- Festuca asperula Vickery
- Festuca asplundii E.B.Alexeev
- Festuca asthenica Stapf
- Festuca atlantica Duval-Jouve
- Festuca auquieri Kerguélen
- Festuca auriculata Drobow
- Festuca australis Nees ex Steud.
- Festuca austrouralensis Kulikov
- Festuca azgarica E.B.Alexeev
- Festuca azucarica E.B.Alexeev

== B ==
- Festuca baffinensis Polunin
- Festuca bajacaliforniana Gonz.-Led. & S.D.Koch
- Festuca balcanica (Acht.) Markgr.-Dann.
- Festuca bargusinensis Malyschev
- Festuca bauzanina (Pils) S.Arndt
- Festuca beamanii E.B.Alexeev
- Festuca beckeri (Hack.) Trautv.
- Festuca × belensis M.Toman
- Festuca benthamiana Vickery
- Festuca bhutanica E.B.Alexeev
- Festuca bidenticulata E.B.Alexeev
- Festuca billyi Kerguélen & Plonka
- Festuca boissieri Amo
- Festuca boliviana E.B.Alexeev
- Festuca borbonica Spreng.
- Festuca borderei (Hack.) K.Richt.
- Festuca boriana E.B.Alexeev
- Festuca borissii Reverd.
- Festuca bosniaca Kumm. & Sendtn.
- Festuca boyacensis Stancík
- Festuca brachyphylla Schult. & Schult.f.
- Festuca breistrofferi Chas, Kerguélen & Plonka
- Festuca breviaristata Pilg.
- Festuca breviglumis Swallen
- Festuca brevipaleata (St.-Yves) E.B.Alexeev
- Festuca breviramea Enustsch.
- Festuca brevis (Boiss. & Kotschy) Asch., Schweinf. & Muschl.
- Festuca brevissima Jurtzev
- Festuca brigantina (Markgr.-Dann.) Markgr.-Dann.
- Festuca bromoides L.
- Festuca brunnescens (Tzvelev) Galushko
- Festuca bucegiensis Markgr.-Dann.
- Festuca burgundiana Auquier & Kerguélen
- Festuca burmanica E.B.Alexeev
- Festuca burnatii St.-Yves
- Festuca bushiana (St.-Yves) Tzvelev

== C ==
- Festuca cajamarcae Pilg.
- Festuca calabrica Huter, Porta & Rigo
- Festuca calcarea Denchev
- Festuca caldasii (Kunth) Kunth
- Festuca californica Vasey
- Festuca callieri (Hack. ex St.-Yves) Markgr.
- Festuca calligera (Piper) Rydb.
- Festuca callosa (Piper) St.-Yves
- Festuca calva (Hack.) K.Richt.
- Festuca camerunensis E.B.Alexeev
- Festuca campestris Rydb.
- Festuca camusiana St.-Yves
- Festuca capillifolia Dufour ex Roem. & Schult.
- Festuca cappadocica (Hack.) Markgr.-Dann.
- Festuca caprina Nees
- Festuca carazana Pilg.
- Festuca carchiensis Stancík
- Festuca carnuntina R.Tracey
- Festuca carpatica F.Dietr.
- Festuca carrascana Stancík & Renvoize
- Festuca cartagana E.B.Alexeev
- Festuca casapaltensis Ball
- Festuca catalanae Enustsch. & Prob.
- Festuca cataonica (Hack. ex Boiss.) Markgr.-Dann.
- Festuca caucasica (Boiss.) Hack. ex Boiss.
- Festuca chalcophaea V.I.Krecz. & Bobrov
- Festuca changduensis L.Liu
- Festuca chasii Kerguélen & Plonka
- Festuca chelungkingnica D.M.Chang & Skvortsov ex S.L.Lu
- Festuca chimborazensis E.B.Alexeev
- Festuca chiriquensis Swallen
- Festuca chita Stancík
- Festuca chitagana Stancík
- Festuca chodatiana (St.-Yves) E.B.Alexeev
- Festuca christianii-bernardii Kerguélen
- Festuca chrysophylla Phil.
- Festuca chumbiensis E.B.Alexeev
- Festuca chuquisacae Stancík & Renvoize
- Festuca cinerea Vill.
- Festuca circinata Griseb.
- Festuca circummediterranea Patzke
- Festuca cirrosa (Speg.) Parodi
- Festuca claytonii E.B.Alexeev
- Festuca cleefiana E.B.Alexeev
- Festuca clementei Boiss.
- Festuca coahuilana Gonz.-Led. & S.D.Koch
- Festuca cochabambana E.B.Alexeev
- Festuca cocuyana Stancík
- Festuca coelestis (St.-Yves) V.I.Krecz. & Bobrov
- Festuca colombiana E.B.Alexeev
- Festuca compressifolia J.Presl
- Festuca confusa Piper
- Festuca contracta Kirk
- Festuca copei Renvoize
- Festuca cordubensis Devesa
- Festuca coromotensis Briceño
- Festuca costata Nees
- Festuca costei (St.-Yves) Markgr.-Dann.
- Festuca coxii (Petrie) Hack.
- Festuca cratericola Markgr.-Dann.
- Festuca cretacea T.I.Popov ex Proskor.
- Festuca crispatopilosa Bor
- Festuca cryptantha Cope
- Festuca csikhegyensis Simonk.
- Festuca cumminsii Stapf
- Festuca cundinamarcae E.B.Alexeev
- Festuca curvula Gaudin
- Festuca cuzcoensis Stancík & P.M.Peterson
- Festuca cyllenica Boiss. & Heldr.
- Festuca cynosuroides Desf.
- Festuca cyrnea (St.-Yves & Litard.) Signorini, Foggi & E.Nardi

== D ==
- Festuca dahurica (St.-Yves) V.I.Krecz. & Bobrov
- Festuca dalmatica (Hack.) K.Richt.
- Festuca dasyantha Kunth
- Festuca dasyclada Beal
- Festuca debilis (Stapf) E.B.Alexeev
- Festuca decolorata Markgr.-Dann.
- Festuca deflexa Connor
- Festuca degenii (St.-Yves) Markgr.-Dann.
- Festuca delicatula Lag.
- Festuca densiflora Tovar
- Festuca densipaniculata E.B.Alexeev
- Festuca dentiflora E.B.Alexeev ex Stancík & P.M.Peterson
- Festuca dertosensis Pyke & L.Sáez
- Festuca deserti (Coss. & Durieu) Trab.
- Festuca devesae Mart.-Sagarra
- Festuca dichoclada Pilg.
- Festuca diclina Darbysh.
- Festuca dimorpha Guss.
- Festuca dinirica Stancík
- Festuca discreta F.M.Vázquez
- Festuca dissitiflora Steud. ex Griseb.
- Festuca distichovaginata Pilg.
- Festuca divergens Tovar
- Festuca djimilensis Boiss. & Balansa
- Festuca djurdjurae (Trab.) Romo
- Festuca dolichantha Keng ex Keng f.
- Festuca dolichathera Röser & Tkach
- Festuca dolichophylla J.Presl
- Festuca donax Lowe
- Festuca dracomontana H.P.Linder
- Festuca drakensbergensis Sylvester, Soreng & M.D.P.V.Sylvester
- Festuca drymeja Mert. & W.D.J.Koch
- Festuca duriotagana Franco & Rocha Afonso
- Festuca durissima (Hack.) Kerguélen
- Festuca duvalii (St.-Yves) Stohr
- Festuca dyris (Maire & Trab.) Romo

== E ==
- Festuca earlei Rydb.
- Festuca ebeliana Enustsch.
- Festuca edlundiae S.G.Aiken, Consaul & Lefk.
- Festuca eggleri R.Tracey
- Festuca elata Keng ex E.B.Alexeev
- Festuca elbrusica E.B.Alexeev
- Festuca elegans Boiss.
- Festuca elgonensis E.B.Alexeev
- Festuca elmeri Scribn. & Merr.
- Festuca elviae Briceño
- Festuca elwendiana Markgr.-Dann.
- Festuca eriobasis H.Scholz
- Festuca eskia Ramond ex DC.
- Festuca eugenii Kulikov
- Festuca exaristata E.B.Alexeev
- Festuca extremiorientalis Ohwi

== F ==
- Festuca fabrei Kerguélen & Plonka
- Festuca fasciculata Forssk.
- Festuca fascinata S.L.Lu
- Festuca fiebrigii Pilg.
- Festuca filiformis Pourr.
- Festuca fimbriata Nees
- Festuca flacca Hack. ex E.B.Alekseev
- Festuca flavescens Bellardi
- Festuca floribunda (Pilg.) P.M.Peterson, Soreng & Romasch.
- Festuca forrestii St.-Yves
- Festuca fragilis (Luces) Briceño
- Festuca francoi Fern.Prieto, C.Aguiar, E.Días & M.I.Gut.
- Festuca frederikseniae E.B.Alexeev
- Festuca frigida (Hack.) K.Richt.

== G ==
- Festuca galicicae Horvat ex Markgr.-Dann.
- Festuca galiciensis Bednarska
- Festuca gamisansii Kerguélen
- Festuca gautieri (Hack.) K.Richt.
- Festuca geniculata (L.) Lag. & Rodr.
- Festuca georgii E.B.Alexeev
- Festuca gilbertiana E.B.Alexeev ex S.M.Phillips
- Festuca giraldoi J.C.Ospina & Picca
- Festuca glabrata Tovar
- Festuca glacialis (Miégev. ex Hack.) K.Richt.
- Festuca glauca Vill.
- Festuca glaucispicula Markgr.-Dann.
- Festuca glumosa Hack. ex E.B.Alekseev
- Festuca glyceriantha Pilg.
- Festuca goloskokovii E.B.Alexeev
- Festuca × gonzalez-ledesmae Darbysh.
- Festuca gracilior (Hack.) Markgr.-Dann.
- Festuca gracillima Hook.f.
- Festuca graeca (Hack.) Markgr.-Dann.
- Festuca grandiaristata Markgr.-Dann.
- Festuca gredensis Fuente & Ortúñez
- Festuca greuteri Mart.-Sagarra & Devesa
- Festuca × grodnensis Tretjakov
- Festuca guaramacalana Stancík
- Festuca gudoschnikovii Stepanov
- Festuca guestfalica Boenn. ex Rchb.
- Festuca gypsophila Hack.

== H ==
- Festuca × hackelii Beck
- Festuca halleri All.
- Festuca hallii (Vasey) Piper
- Festuca hartmannii (Markgr.-Dann.) E.B.Alexeev
- Festuca hatico Stancík
- Festuca hawaiiensis Hitchc.
- Festuca hedbergii E.B.Alexeev
- Festuca hedgei (Bor) E.B.Alexeev
- Festuca henriquesii Hack.
- Festuca hephaestophila Nees ex Steud.
- Festuca hercegovinica Markgr.-Dann.
- Festuca herrerae Davidse
- Festuca heteromalla Pourr.
- Festuca heteropachys (St.-Yves) Patzke ex Auquier
- Festuca heterophylla Lam.
- Festuca hieronymi Hack.
- Festuca hintoniana E.B.Alexeev
- Festuca hircina Enustsch. & Prob.
- Festuca hirtovaginata (Acht.) Markgr.-Dann.
- Festuca hirtula (Hack. ex Travis) Kerguélen
- Festuca holubii Stancík
- Festuca hondae E.B.Alexeev
- Festuca hondoensis (Ohwi) Ohwi
- Festuca horridula Pilg.
- Festuca horvatiana Markgr.-Dann.
- Festuca huamachucensis Infantes
- Festuca hubsugulica Krivot.
- Festuca humbertii Litard. & Maire
- Festuca humilior Nees & Meyen
- Festuca huonii Auquier
- Festuca hyperborea Holmen
- Festuca hypsophila Phil.
- Festuca hystrix Boiss.

== I ==
- Festuca iberica (Hack.) K.Richt.
- Festuca idahoensis Elmer
- Festuca igoschiniae Tzvelev
- Festuca ilgazensis Markgr.-Dann.
- Festuca illyrica Markgr.-Dann.
- Festuca imbaburensis Stancík
- Festuca imperatrix Catonica
- Festuca inarticulata Pilg.
- Festuca incurva (Gouan) Gutermann
- Festuca incurvatifolia C.Chatel., Dobignard, Jeanm. & J.F.Léger
- Festuca indigesta Boiss.
- Festuca inguschetica E.B.Alexeev
- Festuca inops De Not.
- Festuca intercedens Lüdi ex Bech.
- Festuca iranica E.B.Alexeev
- Festuca irtyshensis E.B.Alexeev
- Festuca itelmenorum Enustsch. & Prob.

== J ==
- Festuca jacutica Drobow
- Festuca jaliscana E.B.Alexeev
- Festuca jansenii Markgr.-Dann. ex P.Royen
- Festuca japonica Makino
- Festuca javorkae Májovský
- Festuca jeanpertii (St.-Yves) Markgr.
- Festuca × jierru Nava
- Festuca jubata Lowe
- Festuca junatovii E.B.Alexeev
- Festuca juncifolia St.-Amans

== K ==
- Festuca kamtschatica (St.-Yves) Tzvelev
- Festuca kansuensis Markgr.-Dann.
- Festuca karaginensis Enustsch. & Prob.
- Festuca karatavica (Bunge) B.Fedtsch.
- Festuca karavaevii E.B.Alexeev
- Festuca karsiana E.B.Alexeev
- Festuca kashmiriana Stapf
- Festuca kemerovensis Chus.
- Festuca killickii Kenn.-O'Byrne
- Festuca kingii (S.Watson) Cassidy
- Festuca × kolesnikovii Tzvelev
- Festuca kolymensis Drobow
- Festuca komarovii Krivot.
- Festuca korabensis (Jáv. ex Markgr.-Dann.) Markgr.-Dann.
- Festuca koritnicensis Hayek & J.Vetter
- Festuca kozanensis Foggi & Joch.Müll.
- Festuca kozhevnikovii Enustsch. & Prob.
- Festuca krivotulenkoae E.B.Alexeev
- Festuca kryloviana Reverd.
- Festuca kuprijanovii Chus.
- Festuca kurtschumica E.B.Alexeev
- Festuca kurtziana St.-Yves

== L ==
- Festuca lachenalii (C.C.Gmel.) Spenn.
- Festuca ladyginii Tzvelev
- Festuca laegaardii Stancík
- Festuca laevigata Gaudin
- Festuca lahonderei Kerguélen & Plonka
- Festuca lambinonii Kerguélen
- Festuca lanatifolia Tovar
- Festuca lanifera E.B.Alexeev
- Festuca lapidosa (Degen) Markgr.-Dann.
- Festuca lasiorrhachis Pilg.
- Festuca laxa Host
- Festuca lazistanica E.B.Alexeev
- Festuca lemanii T.Bastard
- Festuca lenensis Drobow
- Festuca leptopogon Stapf
- Festuca levingei Stapf
- Festuca ligulata Swallen
- Festuca ligustica (All.) Bertol.
- Festuca lilloi Hack.
- Festuca linigluma J.C.Ospina, Sylvester & M.D.P.V.Sylvester
- Festuca litardiereana Maire
- Festuca litvinovii (Tzvelev) E.B.Alexeev
- Festuca livida (Kunth) Willd. ex Spreng.
- Festuca liviensis (Verg.) Markgr.-Dann.
- Festuca longiauriculata Fuente, Ortúñez & Ferrero Lom.
- Festuca longifolia Thuill.
- Festuca longigluma Tovar
- Festuca longiglumis S.L.Lu
- Festuca longiligula Darbysh.
- Festuca longipanicula Markgr.-Dann.
- Festuca longipes Stapf
- Festuca longivaginata Tovar
- Festuca luciarum Connor
- Festuca lucida Stapf
- Festuca lugens (E.Fourn.) Hitchc. ex Hern.-Xol.

== M ==
- Festuca macedonica J.Vetter
- Festuca macra (Stapf) E.B.Alexeev
- Festuca macrophylla Hochst. ex A.Rich.
- Festuca madida Connor
- Festuca magellanica Lam.
- Festuca makutrensis Zapał.
- Festuca maleschevica Velchev & P.Vassil.
- Festuca marcopetrii Veldkamp
- Festuca marginata (Hack.) K.Richt.
- Festuca maritima L.
- Festuca markgrafiae Veldkamp
- Festuca masafuerana (Skottsb. & Pilg.) Röser & Tkach
- Festuca masatierrae Röser & Tkach
- Festuca matthewsii (Hack.) Cheeseman
- Festuca mekiste Clayton
- Festuca membranacea (L.) Druce
- Festuca michaelis Cebolla & Rivas Ponce
- Festuca microstachys Nutt.
- Festuca minutiflora Rydb.
- Festuca × miscella Darbysh.
- Festuca modesta Steud.
- Festuca molokaiensis Soreng, P.M.Peterson & Catalán
- Festuca mongolica (S.R.Liou & Ma) Y.Z.Zhao
- Festuca monguensis Stancík
- Festuca monticola Phil.
- Festuca morisiana Parl.
- Festuca muelleri Vickery
- Festuca multinodis Petrie & Hack.
- Festuca muralis Kunth
- Festuca musbelica (Reverd.) Ikonn.
- Festuca myuros L.

== N ==
- Festuca nandadevica Hajra
- Festuca × napocae Prodan
- Festuca nardifolia Griseb.
- Festuca nemoralis Türpe
- Festuca nepalica E.B.Alexeev
- Festuca nereidaensis Stancík
- Festuca nevadensis (Hack.) Markgr.-Dann.
- Festuca nigrescens Lam.
- Festuca nigriflora (Hitchc.) Negritto & Anton
- Festuca niphobia (St.-Yves) Kerguélen
- Festuca nitida Kit. ex Schult.
- Festuca nitidula Stapf
- Festuca norica (Hack.) K.Richt.
- Festuca novae-zelandiae (Hack.) Cockayne
- Festuca nubigena Jungh.
- Festuca nuda (Hack. ex Takeda) Koba, H.Ikeda & Yonek.
- Festuca numidica (Trab.) Romo

== O ==
- Festuca obturbans St.-Yves
- Festuca occidentalis Hook.
- Festuca occitanica (Litard.) Auquier & Kerguélen
- Festuca ochroleuca Timb.-Lagr.
- Festuca octoflora Walter
- Festuca oelandica (Hack.) K.Richt.
- Festuca × oenensis Vetter
- Festuca olchonensis E.B.Alexeev
- Festuca olgae (Regel) Krivot.
- Festuca olympica J.Vetter
- Festuca ophioliticola Kerguélen
- Festuca orientalis (Boiss.) B.Fedtsch.
- Festuca orizabensis E.B.Alexeev
- Festuca oroana Stancík
- Festuca × osswaldii Wein
- Festuca ovina L.
- Festuca oviniformis J.Vetter

== P, Q ==
- Festuca × pachyphylla Degen ex Nyár.
- Festuca pallens Host
- Festuca pallescens (St.-Yves) Parodi
- Festuca pallidula E.B.Alexeev
- Festuca pamirica Tzvelev
- Festuca pampeana Speg.
- Festuca panciciana (Hack.) K.Richt.
- Festuca panda Swallen
- Festuca paphlagonica (St.-Yves) Markgr.-Dann.
- Festuca papuana Stapf
- Festuca paradoxa Desv.
- Festuca parciflora Swallen
- Festuca parodiana (St.-Yves) Nicora
- Festuca parodii St.-Yves
- Festuca parvigluma Steud.
- Festuca parvipaleata Jansen
- Festuca parvipaniculata Hitchc.
- Festuca patzkei Markgr.-Dann.
- Festuca paucispicula Fuente & Sánchez Mata
- Festuca pectinella Delile
- Festuca penzesii (Acht.) Markgr.-Dann.
- Festuca peristerea (J.Vetter) Markgr.-Dann.
- Festuca perrieri A.Camus
- Festuca peruviana Infantes
- Festuca petraea Guthnick ex Seub.
- Festuca picoeuropeana Nava
- Festuca picturata Pils
- Festuca pilar-franceii Stancík
- Festuca pilgeri St.-Yves
- Festuca pilosella E.B.Alexeev
- Festuca pindica (Markgr.-Dann.) Markgr.-Dann.
- Festuca pinifolia (Hack. ex Boiss.) Bornm.
- Festuca pirinica Horvat ex Markgr.-Dann.
- Festuca plebeia Vickery
- Festuca plicata Hack.
- Festuca × pocutica Zapał.
- Festuca pohleana E.B.Alexeev
- Festuca polita (Halácsy) Tzvelev
- Festuca poluninii E.B.Alexeev
- Festuca polycolea Stapf
- Festuca pontica Markgr.-Dann.
- Festuca popovii E.B.Alexeev
- Festuca porcii Hack.
- Festuca portaliana Dobignard
- Festuca potaninii Tzvelev & E.B.Alexeev
- Festuca presliana Hitchc.
- Festuca primae E.B.Alexeev
- Festuca pringlei St.-Yves
- Festuca probatoviae E.B.Alexeev
- Festuca procera Kunth
- Festuca prolifera (Piper) Fernald
- Festuca prudhommei Kerguélen & Plonka
- Festuca psammophila (Hack. ex Čelak.) Fritsch
- Festuca pseudodalmatica Krajina
- Festuca pseudodura Steud.
- Festuca pseudoeskia Boiss.
- Festuca pseudosclerophylla Krivot.
- Festuca pseudosulcata Drobow
- Festuca pseudosupina J.Vetter
- Festuca pseudotrichophylla Patzke
- Festuca pseudovaginata Penksza
- Festuca × pseudovaria J.Vetter
- Festuca pseudovivipara (Pavlick) Pavlick
- Festuca pubigluma Tovar
- Festuca pubiglumis S.L.Lu
- Festuca puccinellii Parl.
- Festuca pulchella Schrad.
- Festuca pulchra Schur
- Festuca pulveridolomiana Höcker & T.Gregor
- Festuca pumila Chaix
- Festuca punctoria Sm.
- Festuca purpurascens Banks & Sol. ex Hook.f.
- Festuca pyrenaica Reut.
- Festuca pyrogea Speg.
- Festuca quadridentata Kunth
- Festuca quadriflora Walter
- Festuca queriana Litard.

== R ==
- Festuca raddei Enustsch. & Prob.
- Festuca rechingeri E.B.Alexeev
- Festuca renvoizei Stancík
- Festuca reverchonii Hack.
- Festuca richardsonii Hook.
- Festuca rifana Litard. & Maire
- Festuca rigescens (J.Presl) Kunth
- Festuca rigidifolia Tovar
- Festuca rigidiuscula E.B.Alexeev
- Festuca riloensis (Hack. ex Hayek) Markgr.-Dann.
- Festuca × ripensis M.Toman
- Festuca rivularis Boiss.
- Festuca robinsoniana (C.M.Peña) Röser & Tkach
- Festuca roblensis Gonz.-Led.
- Festuca robustifolia Markgr.-Dann.
- Festuca roigii Dubc. & Ru´golo
- Festuca rosei Piper
- Festuca rothmaleri (Litard.) Markgr.-Dann.
- Festuca rubra L.
- Festuca rupicaprina (Hack.) A.Kern.
- Festuca rupicola Heuff.
- Festuca × rurivaga Tretjakov
- Festuca ruprechtii (Boiss.) V.I.Krecz. & Bobrov
- Festuca rzedowskiana E.B.Alexeev

== S ==
- Festuca sabalanica E.B.Alexeev
- Festuca salzmannii (Boiss.) Boiss. ex Coss.
- Festuca samensis Joch.Müll.
- Festuca sanctae-martae Stancík
- Festuca sanjappae Chandra Sek. & S.K.Srivast.
- Festuca sardoa (Hack.) K.Richt.
- Festuca saurica E.B.Alexeev
- ''Festuca'' × ''savulescui'' Prodan
- Festuca saxatilis Schur
- Festuca saximontana Rydb.
- Festuca scabra Vahl
- Festuca scabriculmis (Hack.) K.Richt.
- Festuca scabrifolia Renvoize
- Festuca scariosa (Lag.) Pau
- Festuca schischkinii Krivot.
- Festuca scholziana Domina & El Mokni
- Festuca sclerophylla Boiss. ex Bisch.
- Festuca serana Markgr.-Dann.
- Festuca setifolia Steud. ex Griseb.
- Festuca sibirica Hack. ex Boiss.
- Festuca sicula C.Presl
- Festuca sikkimensis E.B.Alexeev
- Festuca silana Ardenghi, Pallanza & Foggi, sp. nov.
- Festuca simensis Hochst. ex A.Rich.
- Festuca simlensis (Stapf) E.B.Alexeev
- Festuca simpliciuscula (Hack.) E.B.Alexeev
- Festuca sinensis Keng ex E.B.Alexeev
- Festuca sinomutica Xiang Chen & S.M.Phillips
- Festuca sipylea (Hack.) Markgr.-Dann.
- Festuca × sjuzevii Kulikov
- Festuca skrjabinii E.B.Alexeev
- Festuca skvortsovii E.B.Alexeev
- Festuca sodiroana Hack. ex E.B.Alekseev
- Festuca sommieri Litard.
- Festuca soratana E.B.Alexeev
- Festuca sororia Piper
- Festuca × soshensis Tretjakov
- Festuca soukupii Stancík
- Festuca spectabilis Bertol.
- Festuca spiralifibrosa Vetter
- Festuca staroplaninica Velchev
- Festuca stebeckii Renvoize
- Festuca steinbachii E.B.Alexeev
- Festuca stenantha (Hack.) K.Richt.
- Festuca stojanovii (Acht.) Foggi & Petrova
- Festuca stricta Host
- Festuca subalpina D.M.Chang & Skvortsov
- Festuca subantarctica Parodi
- Festuca subhirtella (Krajina ex Domin) M.Toman
- Festuca subulata Trin.
- Festuca subuliflora Scribn.
- Festuca subulifolia Benth.
- Festuca subverticillata (Pers.) E.B.Alexeev
- Festuca sudanensis E.B.Alexeev
- Festuca sumapana Stancík
- Festuca sumatrana Jansen
- Festuca summilusitana Franco & Rocha Afonso
- Festuca superba Parodi ex Türpe
- Festuca swallenii E.B.Alexeev

== T ==
- Festuca talamancensis Davidse
- Festuca tancitaroensis Gonz.-Led. & S.D.Koch
- Festuca tarmensis Pilg.
- Festuca tatrae (Czakó) Degen
- Festuca taurica (Hack.) A.Kern. ex Hack.
- Festuca tectoria St.-Yves
- Festuca teneriffae Roth
- Festuca thracica (Acht.) Markgr.-Dann.
- Festuca thurberi Vasey
- Festuca tibetica (Stapf) E.B.Alexeev
- Festuca ticinensis (Markgr.-Dann.) Markgr.-Dann.
- Festuca toca Stancík
- Festuca tolucensis Kunth
- Festuca tovarensis Stancík & P.M.Peterson
- Festuca trabutii E.B.Alexeev
- Festuca trachyphylla (Hack.) Hack.
- Festuca transcaucasica (St.-Yves) Tzvelev
- Festuca trichophylla (Ducros ex Gaudin) K.Richt.
- Festuca trichovagina F.Z.Li
- Festuca tristis Krylov & Ivanitzk.
- Festuca trollii E.B.Alexeev
- Festuca tschatkalica E.B.Alexeev
- Festuca tschujensis Reverd.
- Festuca turimiquirensis Stancík & P.M.Peterson
- Festuca tzveleviana Lazkov
- Festuca tzvelevii E.B.Alexeev

== U ==
- Festuca ulochaeta Steud.
- Festuca ultramafica Connor
- Festuca undata Stapf
- Festuca uninodis Hack. ex Stuck.
- Festuca uralensis (Tzvelev) E.B.Alexeev
- Festuca urubambana Stancík
- Festuca ustulata (Hack. ex St.-Yves) Markgr.-Dann.

== V ==
- Festuca vaginalis (Benth.) Laegaard
- Festuca vaginata Waldst. & Kit. ex Willd.
- Festuca valdesii Gonz.-Led. & S.D.Koch
- Festuca valentina (St.-Yves) Markgr.-Dann.
- Festuca valesiaca Schleich. ex Gaudin
- Festuca valida (R.Uechtr.) Pénzes
- Festuca vandovii Denchev
- Festuca varia Haenke
- Festuca vasconcensis (Markgr.-Dann.) Auquier & Kerguélen
- Festuca venezuelana Stancík
- Festuca ventanicola Speg.
- Festuca venusta St.-Yves
- Festuca versicolor Tausch
- Festuca versuta Beal
- Festuca vettonica Fuente, Ortúñez & Ferrero Lom.
- Festuca vierhapperi Hand.-Mazz.
- Festuca × vihorlatica Májovský
- Festuca violacea Ser. ex Gaudin
- Festuca viridula Vasey
- Festuca vivipara (L.) Sm.
- Festuca viviparoidea Krajina ex Pavlick
- Festuca vizzavonae Ronniger
- Festuca vulpioides Steud.

== W ==
- Festuca wagneri (Degen, Thaisz & Flatt) Krajina
- Festuca wallichiana E.B.Alexeev
- Festuca washingtonica E.B.Alexeev
- Festuca werdermannii St.-Yves
- Festuca × wettsteinii Vetter
- Festuca willdenowiana Schult. & Schult.f.
- Festuca wolgensis P.A.Smirn.
- Festuca woodii Stancík

== X, Y, Z ==
- Festuca xanthina Roem. & Schult.
- Festuca xenophontis Markgr.-Dann.
- Festuca yalaensis Joch.Müll. & Catalán
- Festuca yemenensis E.B.Alexeev
- Festuca yulungschanica E.B.Alexeev
- Festuca yunnanensis St.-Yves
- Festuca ziganensis Markgr.-Dann.
- Festuca × zobelii Wein
