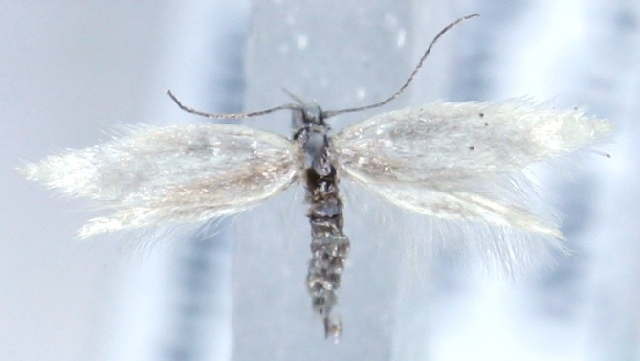

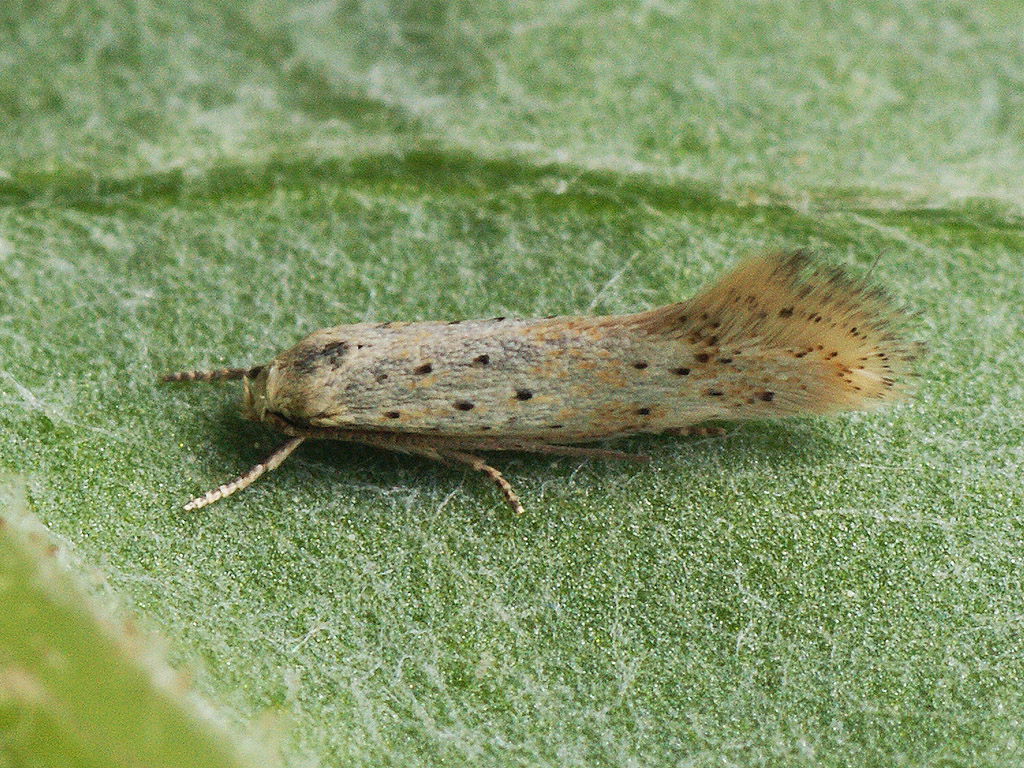

Scientific classification
- Kingdom: Animalia
- Phylum: Arthropoda
- Clade: Pancrustacea
- Class: Insecta
- Order: Lepidoptera
- Family: Elachistidae
- Genus: Elachista
- Species: E. pollinariella

Binomial name
- Elachista pollinariella Zeller, 1839

= Elachista pollinariella =

Species of moth

Elachista pollinariella is a moth of the family Elachistidae. It is found from Finland and the Baltic region to the Iberian Peninsula, Italy and Romania and from France to Poland.

The wingspan is 8–10 mm. Adults are on wing from May to June.

The larvae feed on Brachypodium sylvaticum, Elymus repens, Festuca arvernensis, Festuca lemanii, Festuca longifolia, Festuca ovina, Festuca ovina, Festuca rubra, Poa pratensis, Poa trivialis and Trisetum flavescens. They mine the leaves of their host plant. Larvae can be found from early spring to the end of May.
