= Blue fescue =

Blue fescue is a common name for several plant species and may refer to:

- Festuca glauca
- Festuca longifolia
- Festuca pallens
