= Elachista contisella =

Scientific classification
- Kingdom: Animalia
- Phylum: Arthropoda
- Class: Insecta
- Order: Lepidoptera
- Family: Elachistidae
- Genus: Elachista
- Species: E. contisella

Binomial name
- Elachista contisella Chretien, 1922

Synonyms
- E. triseriatella (Stainton, 1854); E. contisella (Chrétien, 1922); E. gregori (Traugott-Olsen, 1988); E. lerauti (Traugott-Olsen, 1992)

Species of moth

Elachista contisella is a moth of the family Elachistidae that is found in France.
