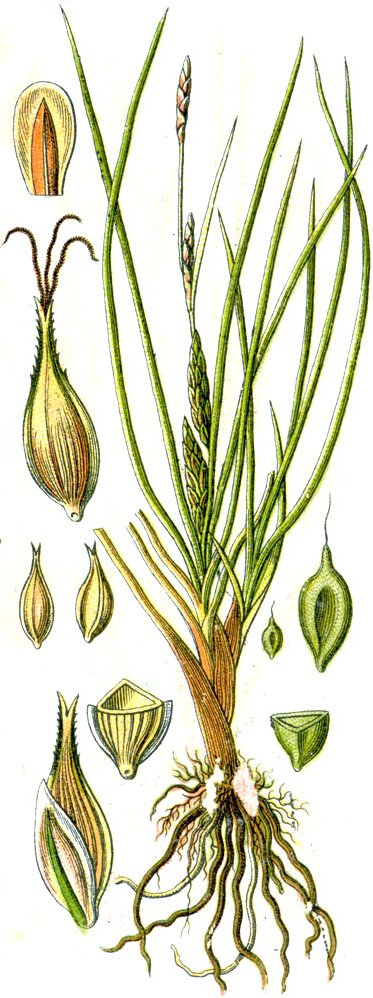
- Botanical illustration

Scientific classification
- Kingdom: Plantae
- Clade: Tracheophytes
- Clade: Angiosperms
- Clade: Monocots
- Clade: Commelinids
- Order: Poales
- Family: Cyperaceae
- Genus: Carex
- Species: C. hordeistichos

Binomial name
- Carex hordeistichos Vill.

Synonyms
- Carex hordeiformis Wahlenb.; Carex lerchenfeldiana Schur

= Carex hordeistichos =

Species of grass-like plant

Carex hordeistichos, called barley sedge, is a species of flowering plant in the genus Carex, native to northwest Africa, southern, central and eastern Europe, and western Asia as far as Iran and Kazakhstan. Its chromosome number is 2n=58, with numerous variants reported.
