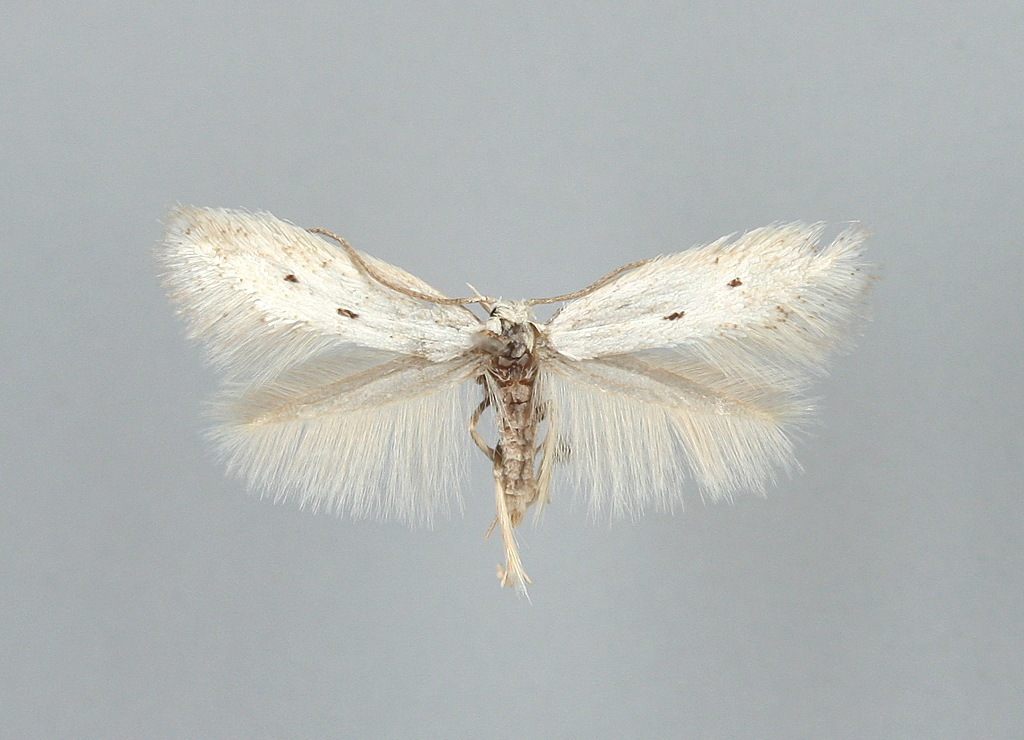

Scientific classification
- Domain: Eukaryota
- Kingdom: Animalia
- Phylum: Arthropoda
- Class: Insecta
- Order: Lepidoptera
- Family: Elachistidae
- Genus: Elachista
- Species: E. triatomea

Binomial name
- Elachista triatomea (Haworth, 1828)

Synonyms
- Porrectaria triatomea Haworth, 1828; Elachista dispilella Zeller, 1839 sensu Stainton, 1849; Elachista triatomella Morris, 1870

= Elachista triatomea =

Species of moth

Elachista triatomea is a moth of the family Elachistidae found in Europe.

== Description ==
The wingspan is 8–9 millimetres (0.31–0.35 in).Head, labial palps and thorax white. Front wings white with three black dots, sometimes with a yellowish tinge. Hindwings light grey.

Adults are on wing from June to July.

The larvae mine the blades of various grasses of Festuca species, including sheep's fescue (Festuca ovina), red fescue (Festuca rubra) and fine-leaf sheep fescue (Festuca tenuifolia).

== Distribution ==
It is found in Ireland, Great Britain, Fennoscandia, Denmark, Germany, Austria, the Czech Republic, Hungary and Romania.
