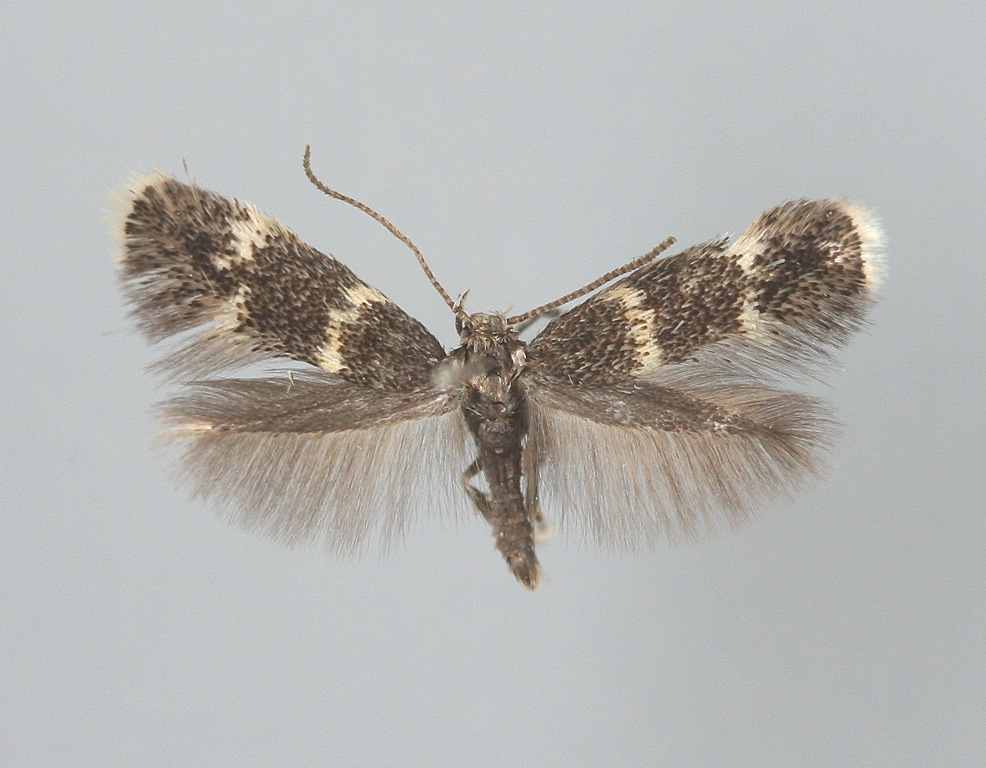
- Male

Scientific classification
- Kingdom: Animalia
- Phylum: Arthropoda
- Clade: Pancrustacea
- Class: Insecta
- Order: Lepidoptera
- Family: Elachistidae
- Genus: Elachista
- Species: E. pullicomella

Binomial name
- Elachista pullicomella Zeller, 1839

= Elachista pullicomella =

Species of moth

Elachista pullicomella is a moth of the family Elachistidae. It is found in most of Europe (except Great Britain, Ireland, the Iberian Peninsula and the Balkan Peninsula), east into Russia.

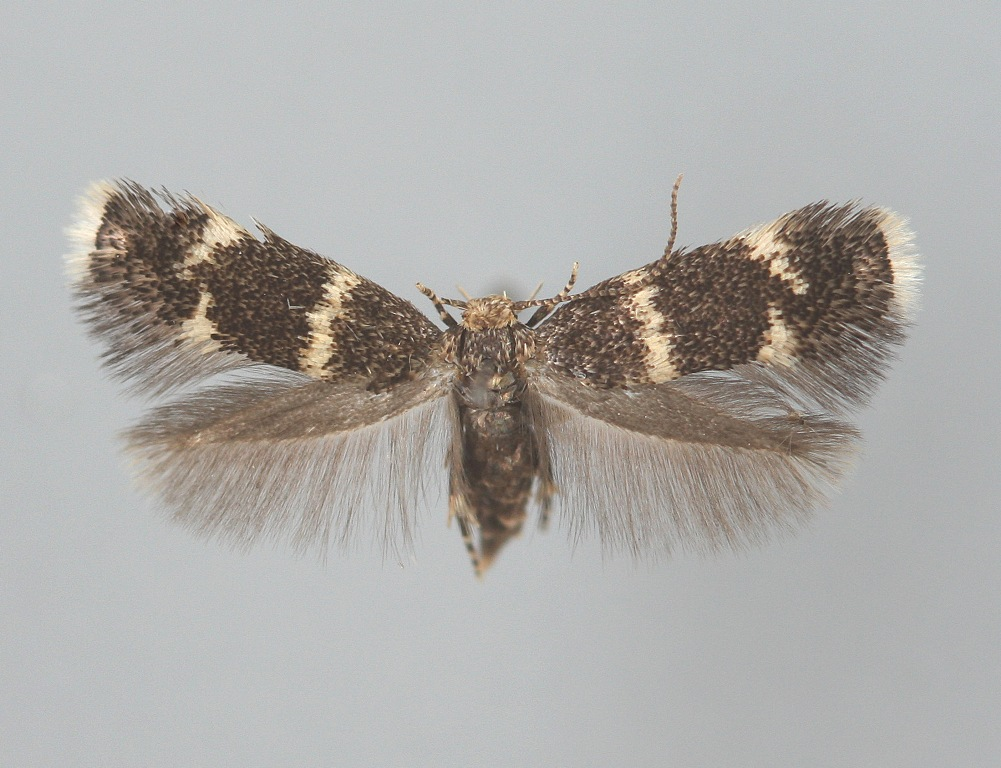
Female

The wingspan is 8–10 millimetres (0.31–0.39 in).

Recorded food plants include Arrhenatherum, Avena, Calamagrostis epigejos, Dactylis glomerata, Deschampsia caespitosa, Deschampsia flexuosa, Elymus repens, Festuca ovina, Festuca rubra, Festuca trachyphylla, Helictotrichon sedenense, Holcus lanatus, Phleum, Poa annua, Poa pratensis and Trisetum flavescens.
