= Elachista steueri =

Scientific classification
- Kingdom: Animalia
- Phylum: Arthropoda
- Class: Insecta
- Order: Lepidoptera
- Family: Elachistidae
- Genus: Elachista
- Species: E. steueri

Binomial name
- Elachista steueri Traugott-Olsen, 1990

Synonyms
- Elachista dispilella (Frey 1839); E. manni (Traugott-Olsen, 1990); E. jaeckhi (Traugot-Olsen, 1990); E. gebzeensis (Traugott-Olsen, 1990)

Species of moth

Elachista steueri is a moth of the family Elachistidae. It is found in Germany, the Czech Republic and Poland.
