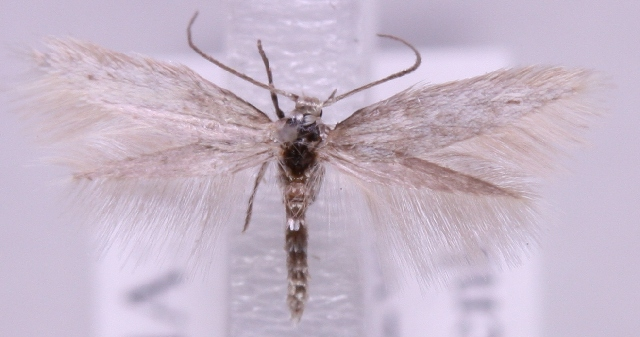

Scientific classification
- Kingdom: Animalia
- Phylum: Arthropoda
- Class: Insecta
- Order: Lepidoptera
- Family: Elachistidae
- Genus: Elachista
- Species: E. gregori

Binomial name
- Elachista gregori Traugott-Olsen, 1988

Synonyms
- E. triseriatella (Stainton, 1854); E. contisella (Chrétien, 1922); E. gregori (Traugott-Olsen, 1988); E. lerauti (Traugott-Olsen, 1992)

= Elachista gregori =

Species of moth

Elachista gregori is a moth of the family Elachistidae. It is found in Latvia, Germany, the Czech Republic, Slovakia and Austria.

The larvae feed on Poaceae species, possibly Nardus stricta and/or Koeleria glauca. They mine the leaves of their host plant.
