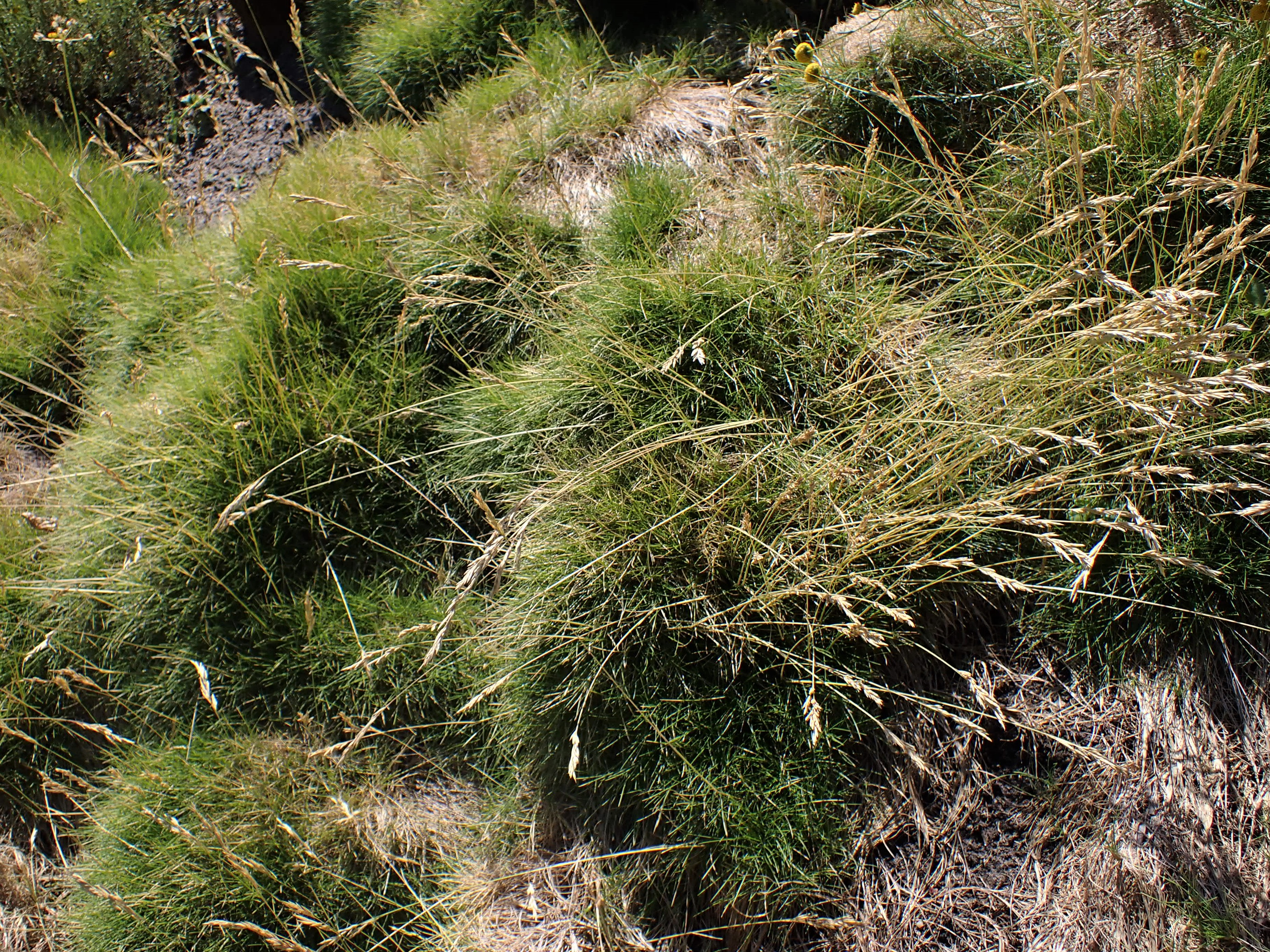

Scientific classification
- Kingdom: Plantae
- Clade: Tracheophytes
- Clade: Angiosperms
- Clade: Monocots
- Clade: Commelinids
- Order: Poales
- Family: Poaceae
- Subfamily: Pooideae
- Genus: Festuca
- Species: F. gautieri

Binomial name
- Festuca gautieri (Hack.) K.Richt.

= Festuca gautieri =

Species of grass

Festuca gautieri, commonly known as spiky fescue or bearskin fescue, is a species of flowering plant in the grass family, Poaceae, native to the Pyrenees. It is a commonly cultivated evergreen or semi-evergreen herbaceous perennial, and, as a native to European alpine areas, it is a small, low-growing Festuca suitable for rock gardens. It is first described in 1890.

== Description ==
The bearskin fescue is a persistent, overwintering green grass with about 20 to 50 centimeters high and bare stalks, which have a diameter of 0.9 to 1.7 millimeters. It has dense horst-like growth with very thin, bristly to rush-shaped, folded leaves that are closed tubularly to one-third to three-quarters of their length. The leaf blades carry five to seven vascular bundles. The ligules are membranous, slightly fringed and about 0.5 to 1 millimeter long.

The yellow-green inflorescence is a panicle that reaches a length of about 4.5 to 7 centimetres. The panicle branches are hairy and each carry an elongated, flattened spikelet that grows to about 9 to 11 millimetres in length. The glumae are unkempt and shorter than the spikelets, the lower one is single-veined, the upper one is three-veined and 4.9 to 5.8 millimetres long. The five-veined lemmas reach a length of 6 to 7.3 millimetres. The flowering season lasts from June to July.

The chromosome count is 2n = 14 or 28.

== Distribution and habitat ==
The bearskin fescue is widespread in the southwest of Europe above all in the Pyrenees. Its range extends from northern Morocco to eastern and north-eastern Spain and south-western France. It needs permeable, but moisture-storing soils in a semi-shade location.

== Other ==
The bearskin fescue forms a hybrid with Festuca eskia, called Festuca ×picoeuropeana Nava.

Due to its attractive, almost spherical shape, the bearskin fescue is used as an ornamental plant in gardening and landscaping. It is undemanding and particularly suitable for rock gardens and heather gardens as well as for tub planting.
