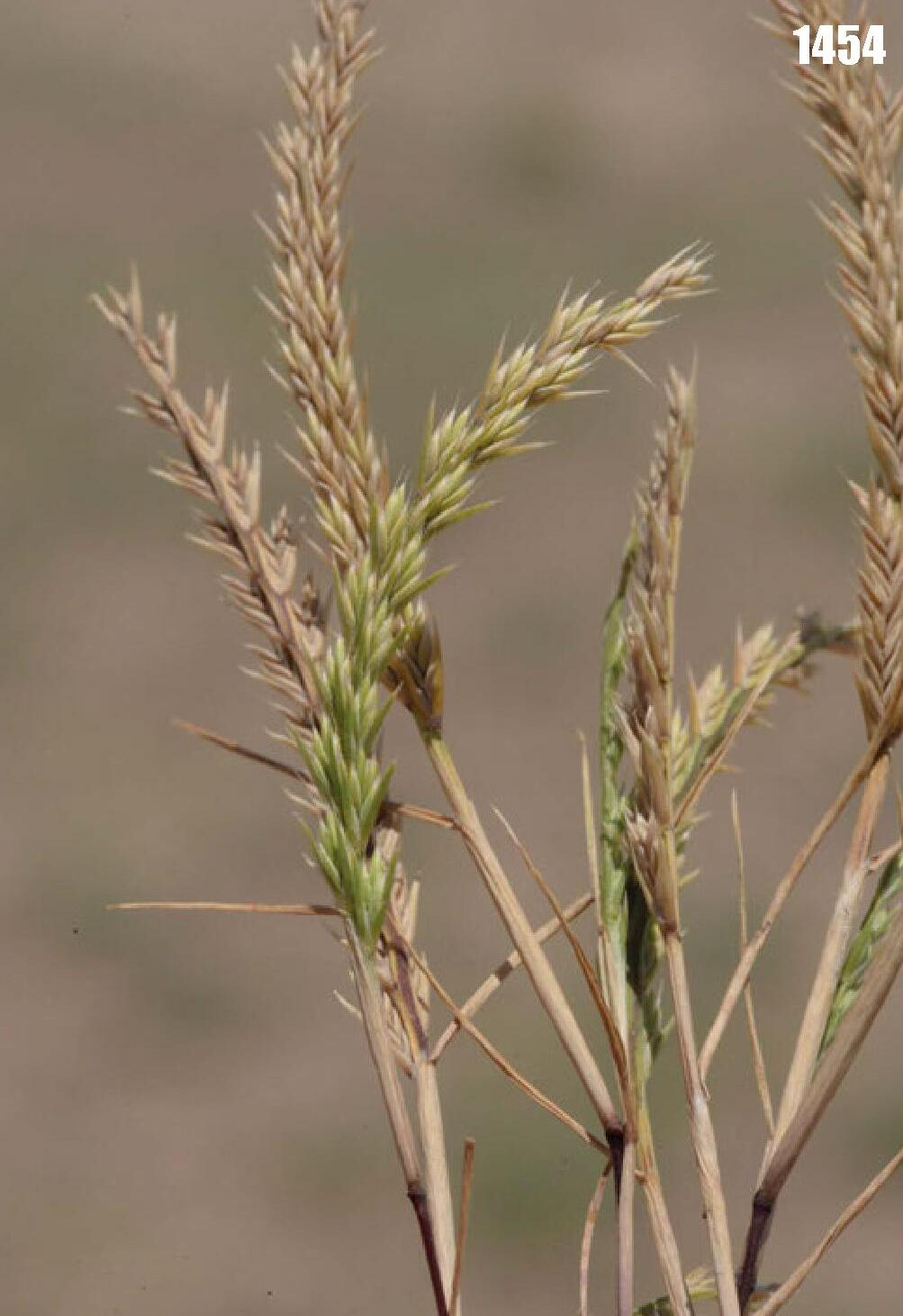

Scientific classification
- Kingdom: Plantae
- Clade: Tracheophytes
- Clade: Angiosperms
- Clade: Monocots
- Clade: Commelinids
- Order: Poales
- Family: Poaceae
- Subfamily: Pooideae
- Genus: Festuca
- Species: F. orientalis

Binomial name
- Festuca orientalis (Boiss.) B.Fedtsch.

Synonyms
- Agropyron subulatiforme Soó; Agropyron subulatum (Banks & Sol.) Roem. & Schult.; Loliolum orientale (Boiss.) V.I.Krecz. & Bobrov; Loliolum subulatum (Banks & Sol.) Eig; Nardurus orientalis Boiss.; Nardurus subulatus (Banks & Sol.) Bor; Triticum subulatum Banks & Sol.

= Festuca orientalis =

Genus of grasses

Festuca orientalis is a species of flowering plant in the family Poaceae, native to Morocco, West and Central Asia to Pakistan. It was first described in 1794 as Triticum subulatum. As the epithet subulata was already in use for Festuca subulata, the epithet orientalis was adopted when the species was transferred to the genus Festuca. This epithet was first used in 1846 for Nardurus orientalis, the basionym of the present name. Under the synonyms Loliolum orientale or Loliolum subulatum, it was the only species in the genus Loliolum.
