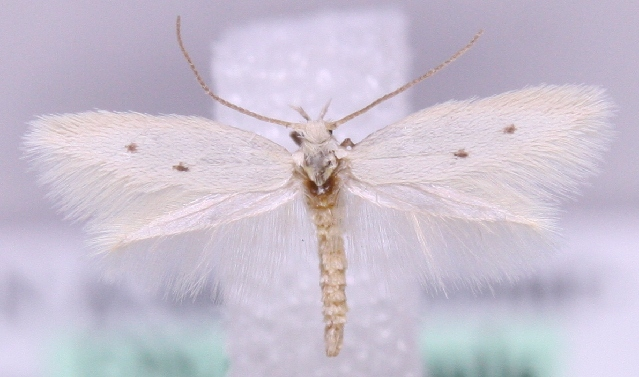

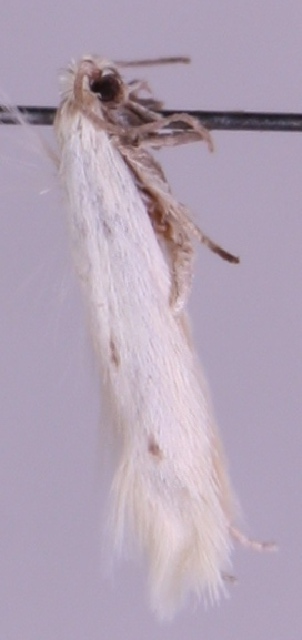

Scientific classification
- Kingdom: Animalia
- Phylum: Arthropoda
- Clade: Pancrustacea
- Class: Insecta
- Order: Lepidoptera
- Family: Elachistidae
- Genus: Elachista
- Species: E. dispilella

Binomial name
- Elachista dispilella Zeller, 1839

Synonyms
- Elachista distigmatella Frey, 1859

= Elachista dispilella =

Species of moth

Elachista dispilella is a moth of the family Elachistidae. It is found from Fennoscandia to the Pyrenees and Italy and from France to Romania.

The wingspan is 7–9 millimetres (0.28–0.35 in). Adults are on wing from May to August in one or two generations per year.

The larvae feed on Festuca heterophylla, Festuca lemanii and Festuca ovina. They mine the leaves of their host plant. Larvae can found from May to June in the north and in April and again in June in the south.
