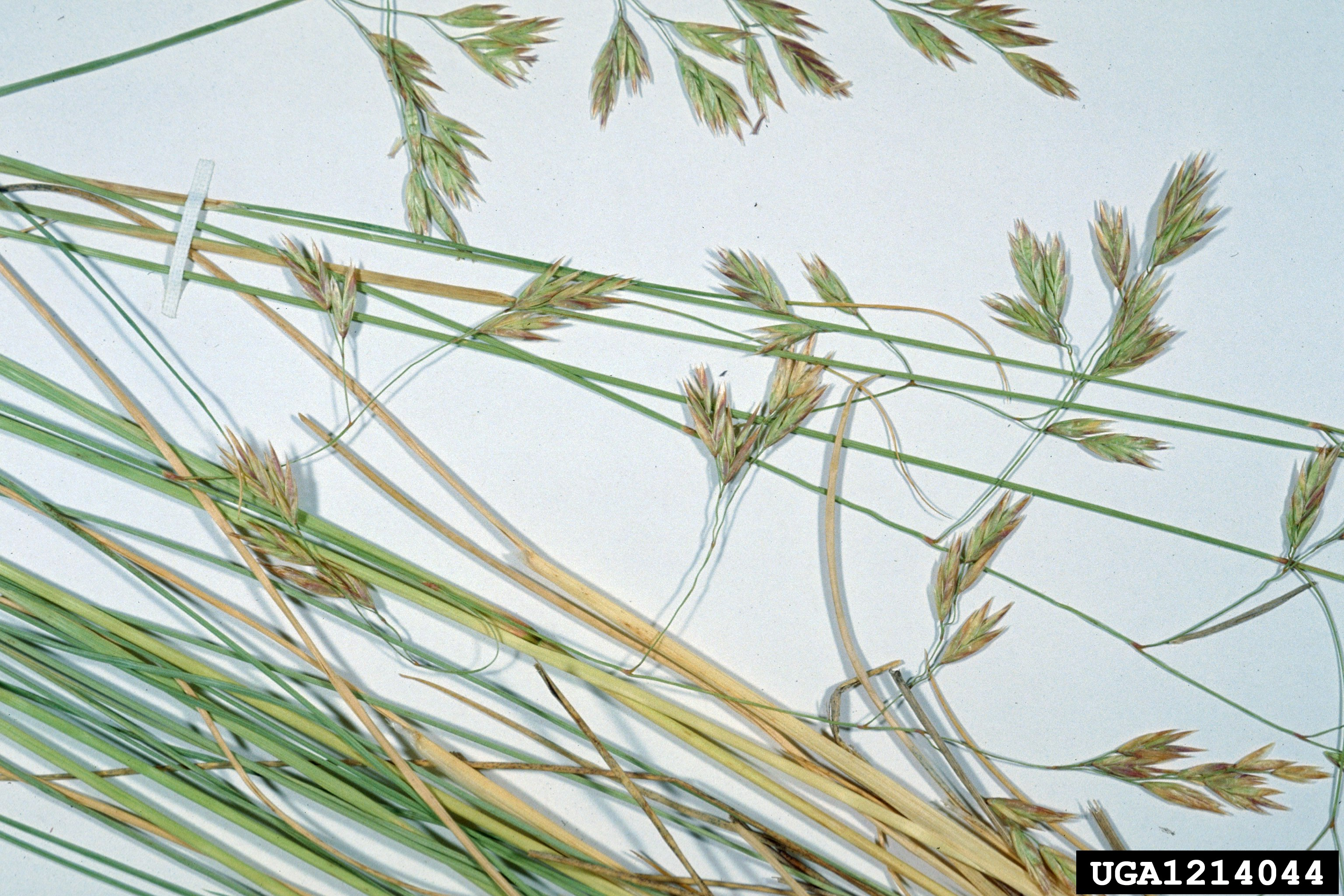

Conservation status
- Apparently Secure (NatureServe)

Scientific classification
- Kingdom: Plantae
- Clade: Tracheophytes
- Clade: Angiosperms
- Clade: Monocots
- Clade: Commelinids
- Order: Poales
- Family: Poaceae
- Subfamily: Pooideae
- Genus: Festuca
- Species: F. thurberi

Binomial name
- Festuca thurberi Vasey

= Festuca thurberi =

Species of grass

Festuca thurberi is a species of grass known by the common name Thurber's fescue. It is native to a section of the western United States encompassing New Mexico, Utah, Colorado, and Wyoming. It probably also occurs in parts of Arizona.

This perennial grass forms a large, dense tuft of stout stems which may just exceed one meter in maximum height. It has a fibrous root network and no rhizomes. The roots are generally colonized by various mycorrhizae. The leaves are mostly located at the base of the stems. They feature a ligule which may be nearly one centimeter in length. The inflorescence is a panicle up to 17 centimeters long with spikelets borne on spreading branches a few centimeters long.

This grass often occurs at high elevations. It can be found in alpine climates. It grows in several habitat types, usually in cool, dry areas. It is a dominant species in a number of regions throughout its range, growing in forest and woodland understory; it is an indicator species for a number of forest understory types. It occurs at elevations above Arizona fescue but below sheep fescue, with some overlap. It is more often a dominant grass at high elevations than the latter. It is associated with forests of quaking aspen in much of its region. In this habitat it can form a dense, tall, productive understory. In the Rocky Mountains it often begins its growth under the snowpack, producing chlorotic leaves until it encounters sunlight. Some meadows and grasslands are dominated by this species.

This grass provides an adequate forage for livestock, more so for cattle than for sheep. Sheep probably find the grass less palatable because of its rough leaves. Cattle grazing in quaking aspen communities consume this grass in large quantities. Many wild animals such as elk utilize the grass as well.
