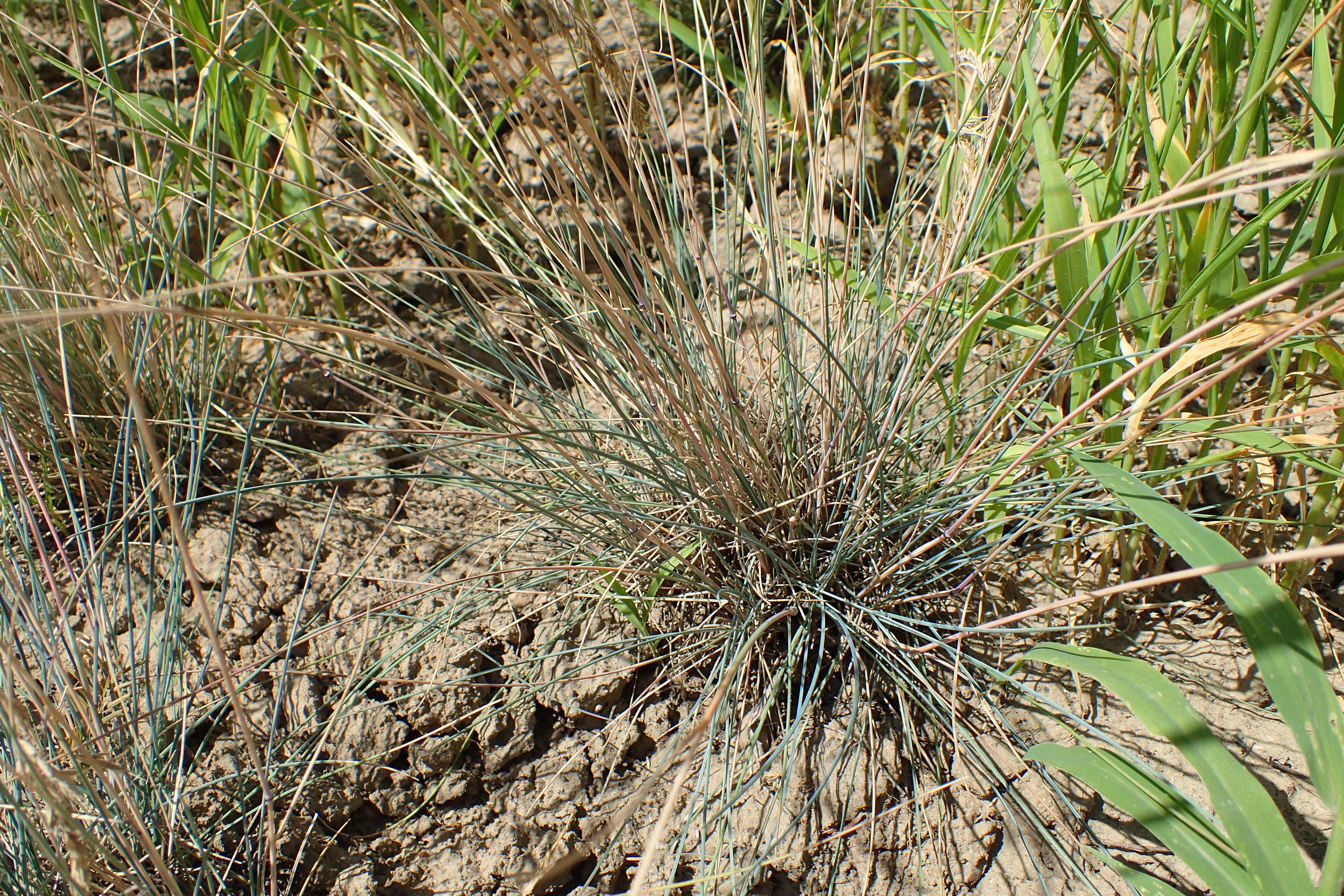

Scientific classification
- Kingdom: Plantae
- Clade: Tracheophytes
- Clade: Angiosperms
- Clade: Monocots
- Clade: Commelinids
- Order: Poales
- Family: Poaceae
- Subfamily: Pooideae
- Genus: Festuca
- Species: F. psammophila

Binomial name
- Festuca psammophila (Hack. ex Celak.) Fritsch

= Festuca psammophila =

Species of grass

Festuca psammophila is a species of grass which is endemic to Central Europe.

== Description ==
The plant is perennial and caespitose with 20–57 centimetres (7.9–22.4 in) long culms and smooth internodes. The ligule is going around the eciliate membrane. Leaf sheaths have an erect and obtuse auricle and are open with hairy surface while the leaf-blades are conduplicate, elliptic, glaucous, filiform, pruinose and are 0.5–1.1 millimetres (0.020–0.043 in) broad. The panicle is open, inflorescenced, and 9–12 centimetres (3.5–4.7 in) long with smooth main branches which are spreading.

Spikelets are oblong, solitary, 6.2–7.5 millimetres (0.24–0.30 in) long, and carry fertile ones that are pedicelled. Fertile florets are diminished at the apex and have 3–8 fertile florets. The glumes are chartaceous, lanceolate and keelless while the apexes and size are different. The upper glume is 0.8–0.9 millimetres (0.031–0.035 in) long and have an acuminate apex while the lower glume apex is acute with absent lateral veins.

Fertile lemma is 3.4–4.9 millimetres (0.13–0.19 in) long and is also glaucous, ovate, and is as chartaceous and keelless as the glumes. The main lemma is carrying one awn that is 0.5–1 millimetre (0.020–0.039 in) long and also have an acuminated apex. Flowers have three stamens while the fruits are ellipsoid and have caryopses with an additional pericarp. Hilum is linear.
