= Festuca polycolea =

Scientific classification
- Kingdom: Plantae
- Clade: Tracheophytes
- Clade: Angiosperms
- Clade: Monocots
- Clade: Commelinids
- Order: Poales
- Family: Poaceae
- Subfamily: Pooideae
- Genus: Festuca
- Species: F. polycolea

Binomial name
- Festuca polycolea Stapf

Species of grass

Festuca polycolea is a species of grass which is endemic to India.

== Description ==
The plant is perennial and caespitose with 5–30 centimetres (2.0–11.8 in) long culms that are erect. The ligule is 1–2.5 millimetres (0.039–0.098 in) long and is going around the eciliate membrane. Leaf-blades are filiform, conduplicate, and are 3–8 centimetres (1.2–3.1 in) long and 1 millimetre (0.039 in) broad with hairy surface. The panicle is ovate, open, inflorescenced and is 2–6 centimetres (0.79–2.36 in) long with scabrous axis.

Spikelets are oblong and solitary with pedicelled fertile spikelets that carry 3–5 fertile florets. The glumes are chartaceous, lanceolate, and keelless, have acute apexes, with only difference is in size. The upper one is 4 millimetres (0.16 in) long while the other one is 3 millimetres (0.12 in). Fertile lemma is 4–5 millimetres (0.16–0.20 in) long and have the same visual appearance as the glumes while the lemma itself have scaberulous surface and acute apex. The main lemma carries an awn that is 2–4 millimetres (0.079–0.157 in) long and also have a palea with two veins. Flowers have three stamens while the fruits are caryopses with an additional pericarp and linear hilum.
