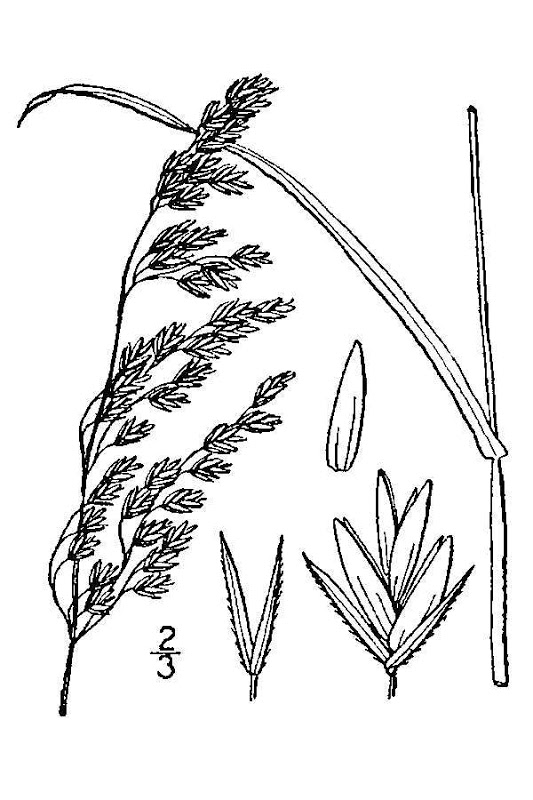
- The different parts of the cluster fescue grass

Scientific classification
- Kingdom: Plantae
- Clade: Tracheophytes
- Clade: Angiosperms
- Clade: Monocots
- Clade: Commelinids
- Order: Poales
- Family: Poaceae
- Subfamily: Pooideae
- Genus: Festuca
- Species: F. paradoxa

Binomial name
- Festuca paradoxa Desv.

= Festuca paradoxa =

Species of grass

Festuca paradoxa, the cluster fescue, is a cool-season grass native to Canada and the Continental United States. Like other cool-season grasses, it grows during the spring and fall, and remains dormant for the rest of the year. This helps maintain ground cover before the warm season grasses begin to grow and after they die off.

== Identification ==
Cluster fescue grows in bunches. It does not have rhizomes. The leaves vary between 4 and 10. It's panicles droop towards the ground as they ripen.

== Habitat ==
Cluster fescue grows in a wide variety of places - wet to dry-mesic prairies. It grows along forest borders and in glades. It is found in 23 states in the United States, throughout the midwest to the east coast. However, it is rarely abundant in natural stands, and is not well known.

== Promotional efforts ==
The Native Plants program at Lincoln University has collaborated with the University of Missouri Extension and the U.S.D.A. Forest Service to inform the public about the benefits of planting cool-season grasses. At Lincoln University's George Washington Carver Farm in Jefferson City, several species of native cool-season grass are displayed, such as Junegrass and Cluster fescue.
