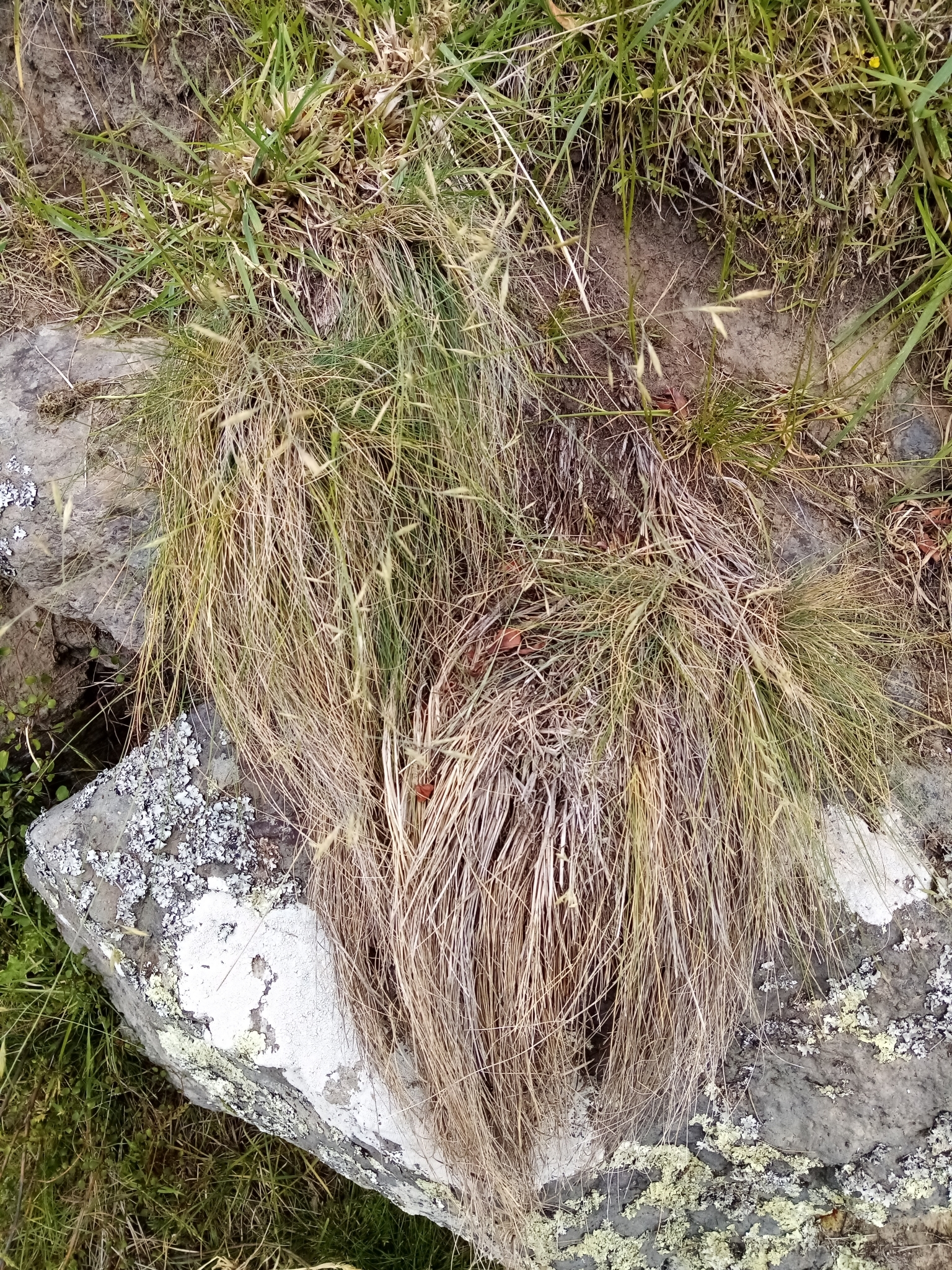

Scientific classification
- Kingdom: Plantae
- Clade: Tracheophytes
- Clade: Angiosperms
- Clade: Monocots
- Clade: Commelinids
- Order: Poales
- Family: Poaceae
- Subfamily: Pooideae
- Genus: Festuca
- Species: F. actae

Binomial name
- Festuca actae Connor

= Festuca actae =

Species of grass

Festuca actae is a species of grass which can be found in the Canterbury Region of New Zealand.

== Description ==
=== General description ===
The plant is perennial and caespitose with 25–60 centimetres (9.8–23.6 in) long culms. The ligule is 0.4–0.7 millimetres (0.016–0.028 in) long and is going around the eciliate membrane. Leaf-sheaths are ribbed 5–10 centimetres (2.0–3.9 in) long and have a hairy surface. The leaf-sheaths auricle is identical in size to the membrane but is erect. Leaf-blades are 20–60 centimetres (7.9–23.6 in) long with the same width as membrane and auricle parts. The panicle is open inflorescenced, is 5–25 centimetres (2.0–9.8 in) long and carries 10–30 fertile spikelets.

=== Spikelets and palea ===
Spikelets are solitary, and carry both scaberulous pedicelles and 4–7 (sometimes 12) fertile florets. It also have a 1–1.5 millimetres (0.039–0.059 in) long rhachilla internodes which are hairy, while the floret callus is pilose and is 0.2–0.5 millimetres (0.0079–0.0197 in) long. The palea is 6–8 millimetres (0.24–0.31 in) long, have scabrous keels and a hairy surface with dentated apex as well.

=== Glumes and lemma ===
The glumes are membranous and keelless with scabrous veins. The upper one is 3–4.5 millimetres (0.12–0.18 in) long and is lanceolate while the other one is ovate and is 4.5–7.5 millimetres (0.18–0.30 in) long. Fertile lemma is 6–9 millimetres (0.24–0.35 in) long, is lanceolate just like the upper glume, and is both glaucous, keelless, and membranous as well. Lemma itself have scaberulous surface and muticous with dentated apex.

=== Flowers and fruits ===
Flowers carry two ciliate and membranous lodicules that are 0.75–1.5 millimetres (0.030–0.059 in) long. The also have three stamens that are 3.5–4.4 millimetres (0.14–0.17 in) long and are yellow in colour. Their ovary is hairy at the apex. The fruits are caryopses and are 3–4.75 millimetres (0.118–0.187 in) long with an additional pericarp, which just like flowers is hairy at the apex as well. Hilum is linear and is located 0.6 millimetres (0.024 in) of caryopsis, while the embryo is 0.25–0.33 millimetres (0.0098–0.0130 in) over it.
