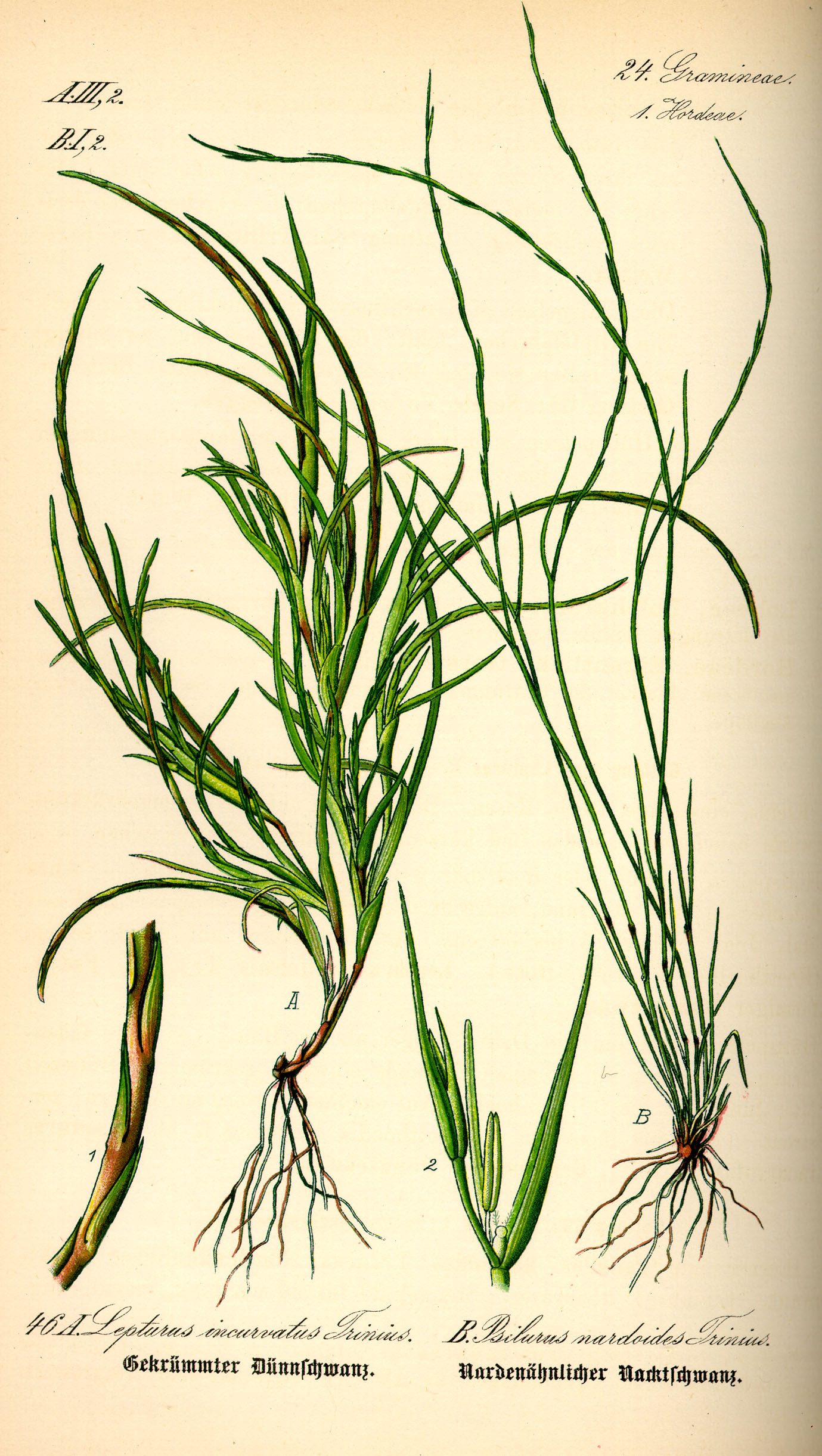
- B (right): illustration as Psilurus nardoides

Scientific classification
- Kingdom: Plantae
- Clade: Tracheophytes
- Clade: Angiosperms
- Clade: Monocots
- Clade: Commelinids
- Order: Poales
- Family: Poaceae
- Subfamily: Pooideae
- Genus: Festuca
- Species: F. incurva

Binomial name
- Festuca incurva (Gouan) Gutermann

Synonyms
- Asprella aristata (L.) Kuntze; Asprella nardiformis Host, nom. superfl.; Nardus aristata L.; Nardus incurva Gouan; Nardus monandra (Cav.) Raspail; Psilurus aristatus subsp. erythrostachyos Asch. & Graebn.; Psilurus aristatus (L.) Duval-Jouve; Psilurus hirtellus Simonk.; Psilurus incurvus var. hirtellus (Simonk.) Asch. & Graebn.; Psilurus incurvus (Gouan) Schinz & Thell.; Psilurus nardoides Trin., nom. superfl.; Psilurus rottboellioides Griff.; Rottboellia monandra Cav.

= Festuca incurva =

Genus of grasses

Festuca incurva is a species of flowering plant in the family Poaceae, native from the Mediterranean to Central Asia and Pakistan. When placed in the monotypic genus Psilurus as Psilurus incurvus, it was the only species.

== Taxonomy ==
The species was first described by Antoine Gouan in 1762 as Nardus incurva. In 1913, it was transferred to the genus Psilurus as the only species Psilurus incurvus. In 2014, it was transferred to Festuca, the placement accepted by Plants of the World Online as of November 2024.

== Distribution ==
Festuca incurva has a widespread distribution. It is native to southwestern Europe (the Balearic Islands, Corsica, France, Portugal, Sardinia and Spain), southeastern Europe (Albania, Bulgaria, Greece, Italy, Crete, Romania, Sicily, European Turkey and the former Yugoslavia), North Africa (Algeria, Libya, Morocco, Tunisia), Western Asia (Afghanistan, Cyprus, the East Aegean Islands, Iran, Iraq, Lebanon-Syria, Palestine and Turkey), the Caucasus, Crimea, Pakistan, and Central Asia (Tajikistan and Uzbekistan). It has been introduced into Germany and parts of Australia.
