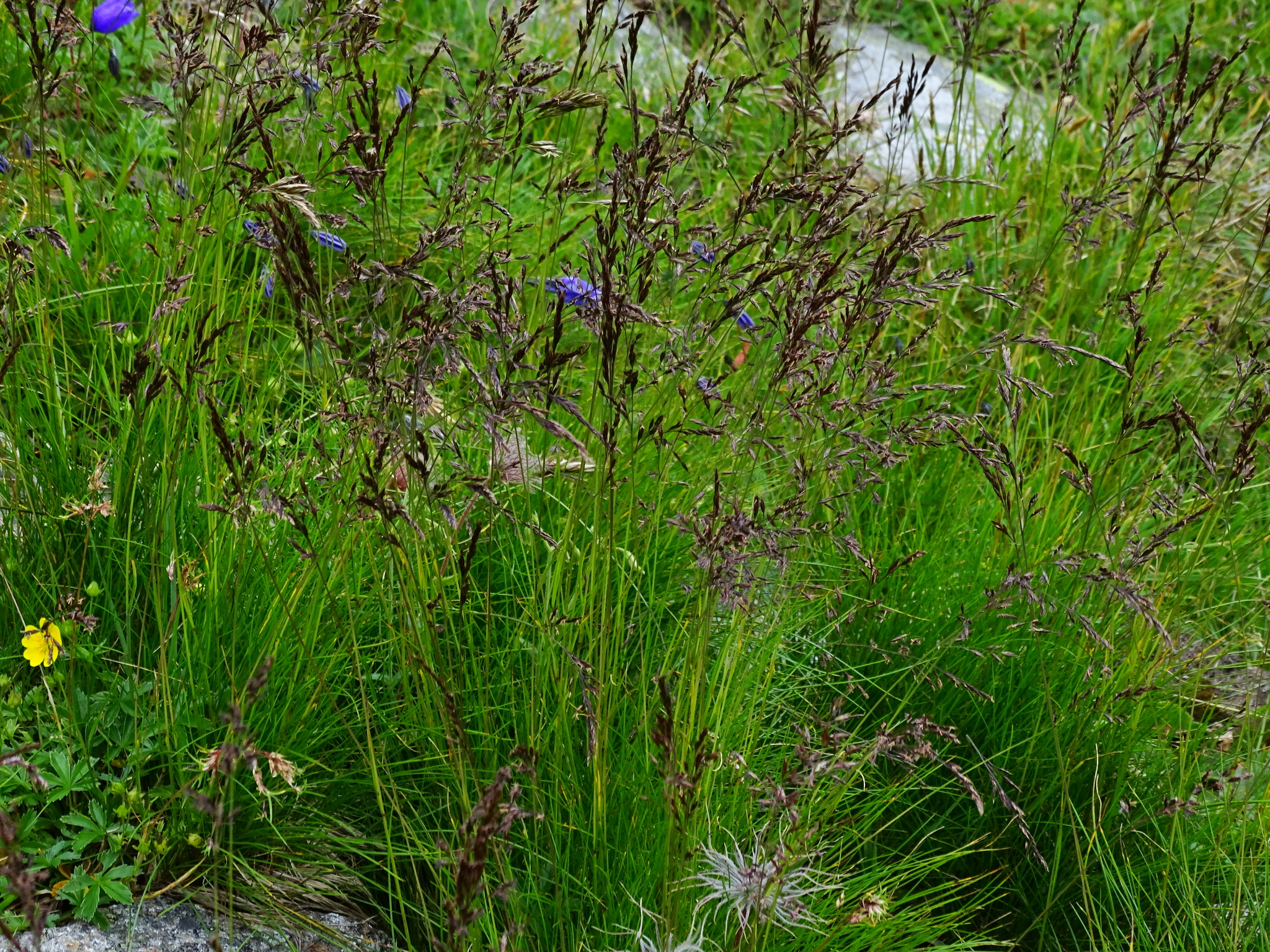

Scientific classification
- Kingdom: Plantae
- Clade: Tracheophytes
- Clade: Angiosperms
- Clade: Monocots
- Clade: Commelinids
- Order: Poales
- Family: Poaceae
- Subfamily: Pooideae
- Genus: Festuca
- Species: F. picturata

Binomial name
- Festuca picturata Pils

= Festuca picturata =

Species of grass

Festuca picturata is a species of grass which can be found in Central, Eastern and southeastern Europe.

== Description ==
The plant is perennial and caespitose with 25–40 centimetres (9.8–15.7 in) long culms that are clumped. The ligule is going around the eciliate membrane while the leaf-sheaths are tubular, smooth, and have a hairy surface. Leaf-blades are filiform, 0.4–0.6 millimetres (0.016–0.024 in) broad, and carry 5–7 vascular bundles which have the same amount of inner ridges. The panicle is open, inflorescenced and is 4–7 centimetres (1.6–2.8 in) long with hairy branches.

Spikelets are oblong and solitary with pedicelled fertile spikelets that carry some fertile florets that are diminished at the apex. The glumes are chartaceous, keelless, have acute apexes, with only difference is in size. The upper one is ovate and is 3.4–3.9 millimetres (0.13–0.15 in) long while the other one is lanceolate and have no size what so ever.

Fertile lemma is 4.2–5.2 millimetres (0.17–0.20 in) long and is chartaceous, keelless, and oblong as well with either green or purple colouring. The lemma itself have an acute apex while the main lemma have an awn that is 1.2–2 millimetres (0.047–0.079 in) long. The palea have two veins while the flowers have three stamens and hairy apex on the ovary. The fruits are caryopses with an additional pericarp and linear hilum.
