= Festuca breviglumis =

Scientific classification
- Kingdom: Plantae
- Clade: Tracheophytes
- Clade: Angiosperms
- Clade: Monocots
- Clade: Commelinids
- Order: Poales
- Family: Poaceae
- Subfamily: Pooideae
- Genus: Festuca
- Species: F. breviglumis

Binomial name
- Festuca breviglumis Swallen

Synonyms
- Bromus cernuus Swallen

Species of grass

Festuca breviglumis is a species of grass in the family Poaceae. The name was published in 1950 in the US.

== Habitat ==
Festuca breviglemis grows mainly in subtropical biomes and is native to Costa Rica, Guatemala, Mexico, and Panamá.

== Characteristics ==
Fesctua breviglemis is a perennial plant with culms erect ascending from 60 to 130 centimeters long and glumes that are shorter than its spikelets.

== Etymology ==
The specific name breviglemis came from the words 'breviter' and 'glumae' together meaning 'short glumes'.
