= Festuca abyssinica =

Scientific classification
- Kingdom: Plantae
- Clade: Tracheophytes
- Clade: Angiosperms
- Clade: Monocots
- Clade: Commelinids
- Order: Poales
- Family: Poaceae
- Subfamily: Pooideae
- Genus: Festuca
- Species: F. abyssinica

Binomial name
- Festuca abyssinica A.Rich.

Synonyms
- Festuca gelida Chiov.; Festuca restituta Steud.; Festuca rigidula Steud.; Festuca schimperiana A.Rich.; Festuca tibestica Miré & Quézel; Koeleria afromontana Jacq.-Fél..

Species of grass

Festuca abyssinica is a species of grass which is endemic to Africa.

== Description ==
The plant is perennial and caespitose with 15–60 centimetres (5.9–23.6 in) long culms. The ligule is 0.5–1 millimetre (0.020–0.039 in) long and is going around the eciliate membrane. Leaf-blades are filiform and are 3–25 centimetres (1.2–9.8 in) long and 1–3 millimetres (0.039–0.118 in) wide. The panicle is contracted, linear, inflorescenced and 8–20 centimetres (3.1–7.9 in) long. Spikelets are lanceolate, ovate, solitary, 6.5–12 millimetres (0.26–0.47 in) long, and have pedicelled fertile spikelets that carry 2–6 fertile florets which have a diminished apex. It also has a hairy callus and scaberulous palea keels.

The glumes are lanceolate, membranous, and keelless, have acute apexes, with the only difference being in size. The upper one is 5.5–8.5 millimetres (0.22–0.33 in) long while the other one is ovate and is 6–10 millimetres (0.24–0.39 in) long. Fertile lemma is 6.5–9.5 millimetres (0.26–0.37 in) long and is also chartaceous, elliptic and keelless with scaberulous surface. Lemma itself is muticous with acute apex. Flowers have a hairy ovary and three stamens that are 2–2.5 millimetres (0.079–0.098 in) long. The fruits are caryopses with an additional pericarp, which just like flowers is hairy as well. Hilum is linear.

== Habitat and distribution ==
Festuca abyssinica grows in mountain grasslands, generally in moist and often peaty soils.

It ranges along the mountains of eastern Africa, from Ethiopia through Kenya, Uganda, Tanzania, eastern Democratic Republic of the Congo, Rwanda, Burundi, Malawi, Mozambique, and Zambia to eastern Zimbabwe, and in the Tibesti Mountains of Chad, the Cameroon Highlands of Cameroon, Bioko, and the highlands of Angola.
