= Festuca floribunda =

Scientific classification
- Kingdom: Plantae
- Clade: Embryophytes
- Clade: Tracheophytes
- Clade: Angiosperms
- Clade: Monocots
- Clade: Commelinids
- Order: Poales
- Family: Poaceae
- Subfamily: Pooideae
- Genus: Festuca
- Species: F. floribunda

Binomial name
- Festuca floribunda (Pilg.) P.M.Peterson, Soreng & Romasch.

Synonyms
- Bromus mandonianus Henrard; Dielsiochloa floribunda (Pilg.) Pilg.; Dielsiochloa floribunda var. major Pilg.; Dielsiochloa floribunda var. weberbaueri (Pilg.) Pilg.; Trisetum floribundum Pilg.; Trisetum floribundum var. weberbaueri (Pilg.) Louis-Marie; Trisetum weberbaueri Pilg.

Species of grass

Festuca floribunda is a species of flowering plant in the grass family Poaceae, native to western South America (Bolivia, Peru, northwestern Argentina and northern Chile). When placed in the monotypic genus Dielsiochloa as Dielsiochloa floribunda, it was the only species.

== Taxonomy ==
The species was first described by Robert K. F. Pilger in 1906 as Trisetum floribundum. It was transferred to the monotypic genus Dielsiochloa in 1943, where it was the only species. Molecular phylogenetic studies from 2007 onwards showed that the species was deeply embedded within a group of species of Festuca native to northern South America, being most closely related to Festuca cuzcoensis, and in 2018, it was transferred to the genus Festuca.
