= Festuca pallescens =

Scientific classification
- Kingdom: Plantae
- Clade: Tracheophytes
- Clade: Angiosperms
- Clade: Monocots
- Clade: Commelinids
- Order: Poales
- Family: Poaceae
- Subfamily: Pooideae
- Genus: Festuca
- Species: F. pallescens

Binomial name
- Festuca pallescens (St.-Yves) Parodi (1953)

Synonyms
- Festuca gracillima subvar. pallescens St.-Yves (1927); Festuca gracillima var. foliosa Parodi (1953); Festuca gracillima var. patagonica Speg. (1897); Festuca gracillima var. ramosa St.-Yves (1927); Festuca gracillima f. scabra St.-Yves (1927); Festuca magniflora E.B.Alexeev (1984); Festuca pallescens var. foliosa Parodi (1953); Festuca pallescens var. grandiflora Parodi (1953); Festuca pallescens var. scabra (St.-Yves) Parodi (1953)

Species of grass

Festuca pallescens is a species of grass in the family Poaceae. It is native to southern Chile and Argentina. It is perennial and prefers to grow in temperate biomes. It was first described in 1953 in Argentina.
