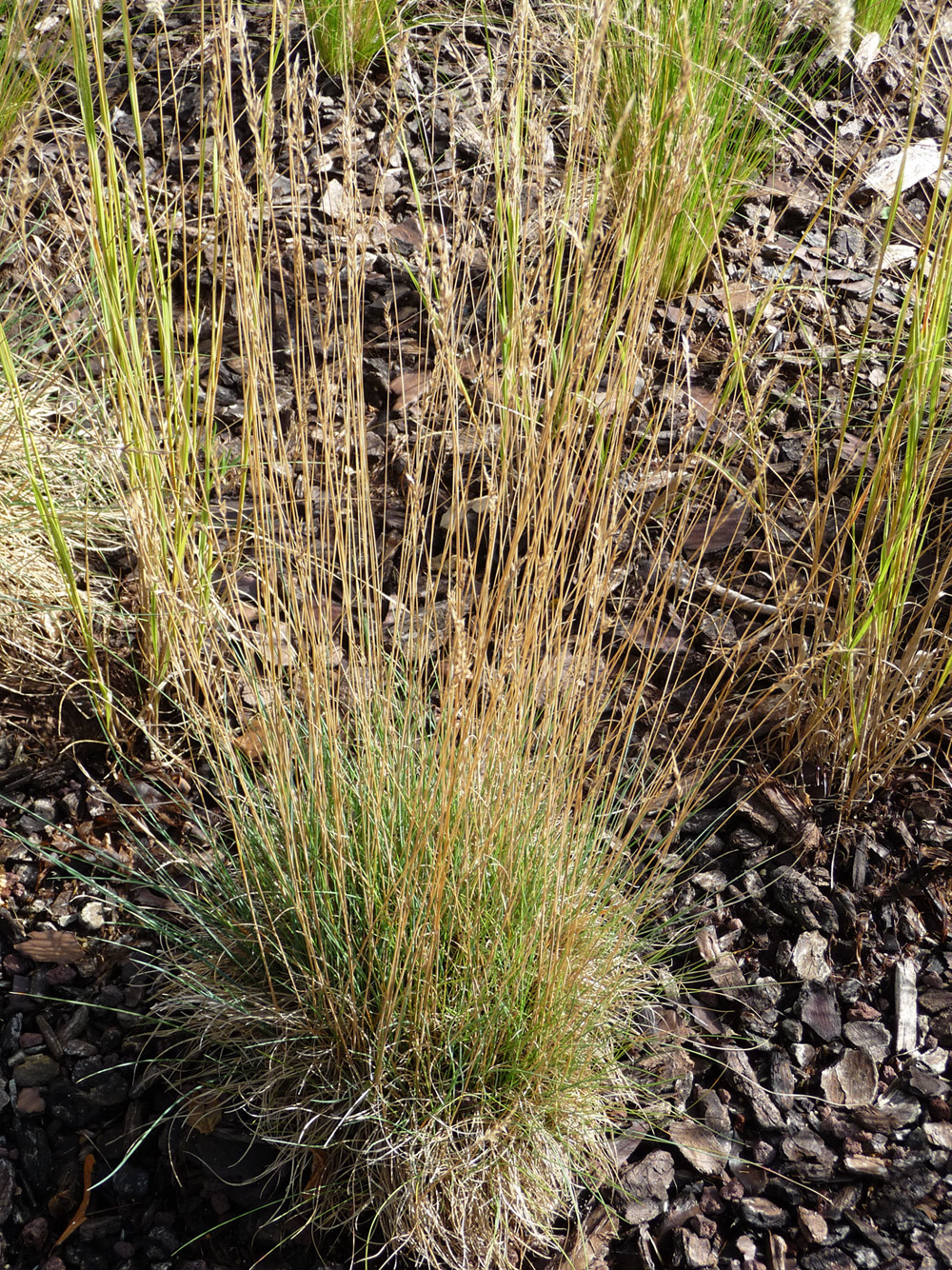

Scientific classification
- Kingdom: Plantae
- Clade: Tracheophytes
- Clade: Angiosperms
- Clade: Monocots
- Clade: Commelinids
- Order: Poales
- Family: Poaceae
- Subfamily: Pooideae
- Genus: Festuca
- Species: F. arvernensis

Binomial name
- Festuca arvernensis Auquier, Kerguélen & Markgr.-Dannenb.

Synonyms
- Festuca glauca Lam., non Vill.; Festuca ovina L. var. glauca (Lam.) W.D.J. Koch

= Festuca arvernensis =

Species of grass

Festuca arvernensis (also known as field fescue) is a species of perennial plant from family Poaceae. It is native to France. It can also be found in such US states as California and New Mexico. It was first described in 1977.
