= Festuca ligulata =

Conservation status
- Critically Imperiled (NatureServe)

Scientific classification
- Kingdom: Plantae
- Clade: Embryophytes
- Clade: Tracheophytes
- Clade: Angiosperms
- Clade: Monocots
- Clade: Commelinids
- Order: Poales
- Family: Poaceae
- Subfamily: Pooideae
- Genus: Festuca
- Species: F. ligulata

Binomial name
- Festuca ligulata Swallen

Species of grass

Festuca ligulata is a species of grass known by the common name Guadalupe fescue. There is one population each in Texas and Coahuila.

This rhizomatous perennial grass forms clumps of stems up to 80 centimeters tall. The inflorescence is up to about 16 centimeters long and has erect or spreading branches with spikelets near the ends. Flowering occurs in August and September.

One population of this rare grass can be found in Big Bend National Park in Texas in the United States. This population has no more than about 150 individuals. The other, a larger population, is in Maderas del Carmen in Coahuila, Mexico. Another Texas population, in the Guadalupe Mountains, has not been seen since 2002. The status of a second Coahuila population is unknown.

A trail runs through the Texas population and the plants may experience trampling by hikers and horses. The species is threatened by fire suppression in the park because the grass likely needs periodic small fires to keep the habitat open. The grass may experience grazing, as it is palatable to livestock.
