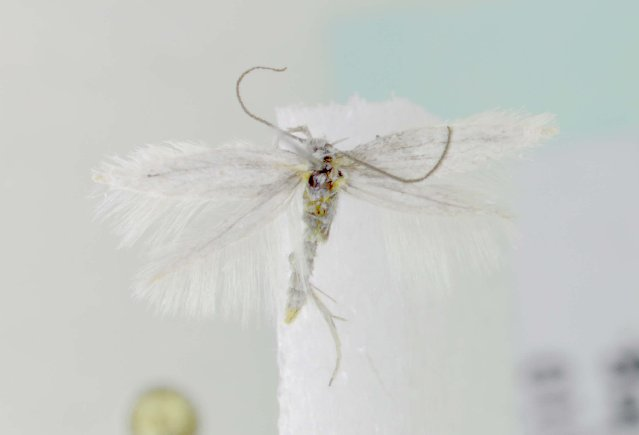

Scientific classification
- Domain: Eukaryota
- Kingdom: Animalia
- Phylum: Arthropoda
- Class: Insecta
- Order: Lepidoptera
- Family: Elachistidae
- Genus: Elachista
- Species: E. triseriatella

Binomial name
- Elachista triseriatella Stainton, 1854

= Elachista triseriatella =

Species of moth

Elachista triseriatella is a moth of the family Elachistidae. It is found in Great Britain, Denmark, Latvia to Spain and Italy.

The wingspan is about 7 millimetres (0.28 in). Adults are on wing from June to July.

The larvae feed on Festuca longifolia and Festuca ovina. They mine the leaves of their host plant. Larvae can be found from autumn to the end of May.
