= Dominique Villars =

French botanist

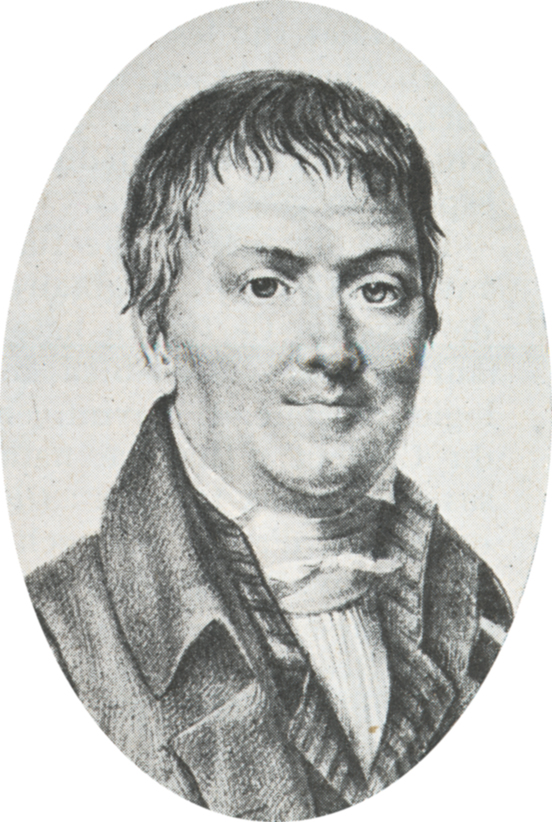
- Dominique Villars
- Born: 14 November 1745; Le Villard, Le Noyer, Hautes-Alpes
- Died: 26 June 1814 (aged 68); Strasbourg
- Occupation: Botanist
- Scientific career
- Author abbrev. (botany): Vill.

Dominique Villars or Villar (born 14 November 1745 in Le Villard, part of the commune of Le Noyer, Hautes-Alpes, and died on 26 June 1814 in Strasbourg) was an 18th-century French botanist.

His main work is Histoire des plantes du Dauphiné published between 1786 and 1789, in which about 2,700 species (particularly alpine plants) are described, after over twenty years of observation in the Dauphiné region of southeastern France. His herbarium and botanical manuscripts are preserved at the Muséum d'histoire naturelle de Grenoble.
