= Festuca trachyphylla =

Conservation status
- Unranked (NatureServe)

Scientific classification
- Kingdom: Plantae
- Clade: Tracheophytes
- Clade: Angiosperms
- Clade: Monocots
- Clade: Commelinids
- Order: Poales
- Family: Poaceae
- Subfamily: Pooideae
- Genus: Festuca
- Species: F. trachyphylla

Binomial name
- Festuca trachyphylla (Hack.) Hack.

Synonyms
- List: Festuca cinerea var. trachyphylla (Hack.) Stohr; Festuca duriuscula subsp. trachyphylla (Hack.) K.Richt.; Festuca duriuscula var. trachyphylla (Hack.) Druce; Festuca longifolia var. trachyphylla (Hack.) Howarth; Festuca ovina subvar. trachyphylla Hack.; Festuca ovina f. trachyphylla (Hack.) Jansen; Festuca ovina var. trachyphylla (Hack.) Druce; Festuca stricta subsp. trachyphylla (Hack.) Patzke ex Joch.Müll.; Festuca brevipila R.Tracey; Festuca duvalii f. barbulata Auquier; Festuca trachyphylla f. barbulata (Auquier) Auquier

Species of grass

Festuca trachyphylla, also known as hard fescue, is a species of grass in the family Poaceae. The species was first published in 1915. This species is native to North, Central and East Europe.

== Habitat ==
Festuca trachyphylla is perennial and mainly grows in temperate biomes.
