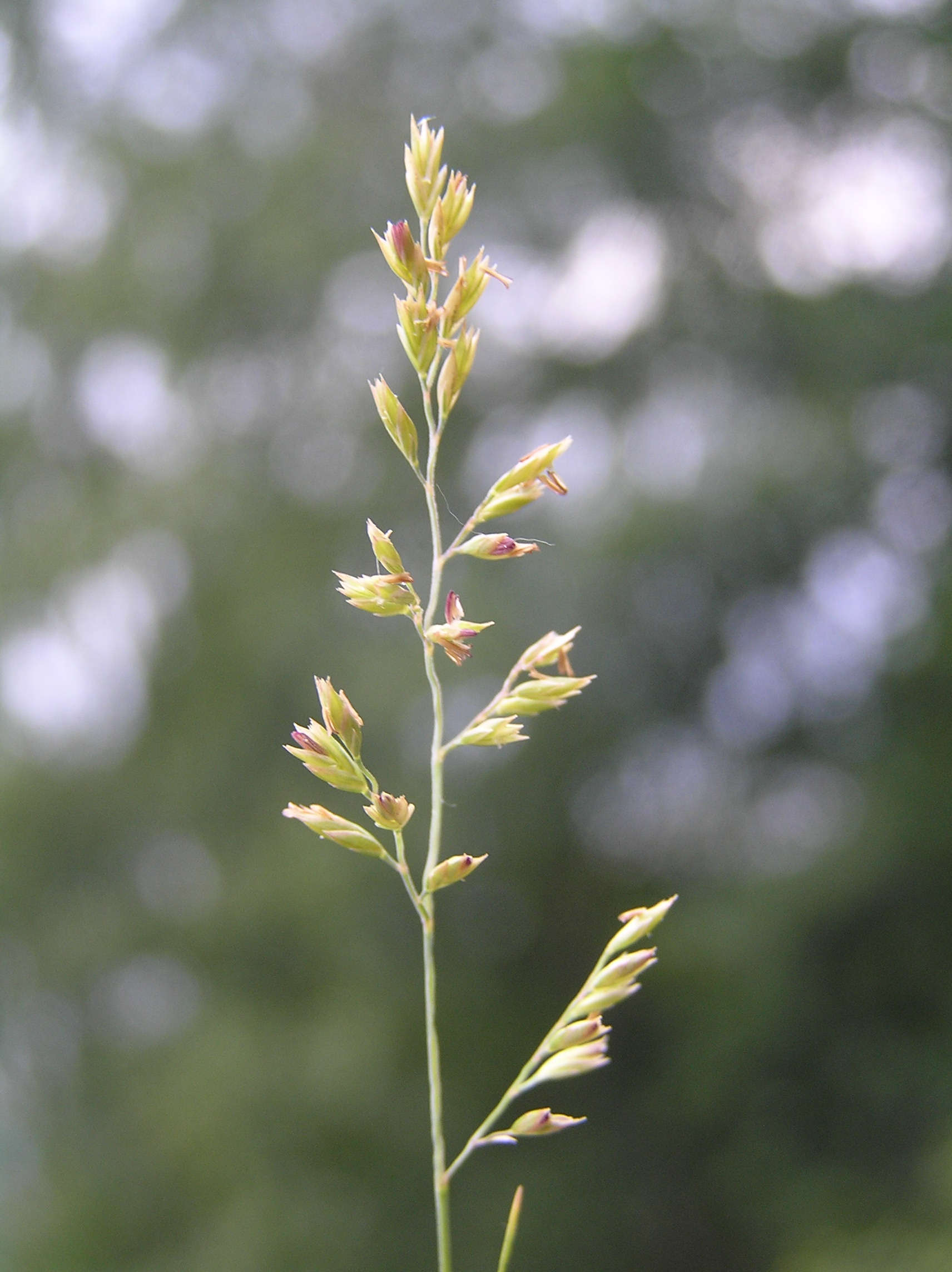

Scientific classification
- Kingdom: Plantae
- Clade: Tracheophytes
- Clade: Angiosperms
- Clade: Monocots
- Clade: Commelinids
- Order: Poales
- Family: Poaceae
- Subfamily: Pooideae
- Genus: Festuca
- Species: F. filiformis

Binomial name
- Festuca filiformis Pourr.

Synonyms
- Festuca tenuifolia

= Festuca filiformis =

Species of grass

Festuca filiformis, known by the common names fine-leaf sheep fescue, fine-leaved sheep's-fescue, hair fescue, and slender fescue, is a species of grass. It is native to Europe, and it is widespread elsewhere as an introduced species and often a weed.
