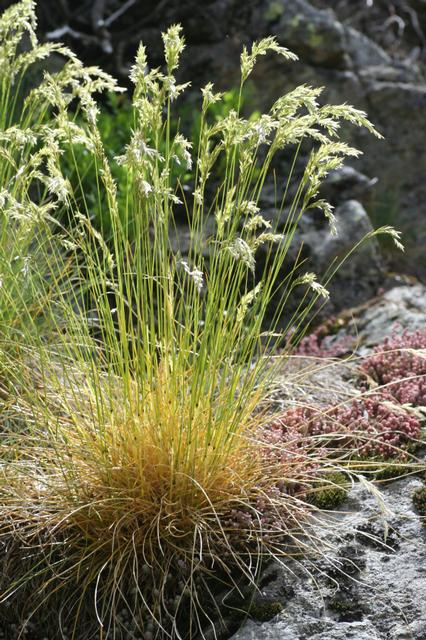

Scientific classification
- Kingdom: Plantae
- Clade: Embryophytes
- Clade: Tracheophytes
- Clade: Angiosperms
- Clade: Monocots
- Clade: Commelinids
- Order: Poales
- Family: Poaceae
- Subfamily: Pooideae
- Genus: Festuca
- Species: F. eskia

Binomial name
- Festuca eskia Ramond ex DC.

Synonyms
- Festuca crinum-ursi Ramond ex Viv.-Morel, (1884); Festuca eskia var. orientalis Nègre, (1975); Festuca eskia var. tenuifolia Nègre, (1975); Festuca pumila subsp. eskia (Ramond ex DC.) Litard., (1945); Festuca souliei St.-Yves, (1924); Festuca varia subsp. eskia (Ramond ex DC.) Hack., Monogr. (1882); Festuca varia var. eskia (Ramond ex DC.) Mert. & W.D.J.Koch, J.C.Röhling, (1823); Schedonorus eskia (Ramond ex DC.) P.Beauv., (1812)

= Festuca eskia =

Species of grass

Festuca eskia is a species of grass which is native to southwestern Europe, in France and Spain.

== Description ==
The plant is perennial and has caespitose with 22–50 centimetres (8.7–19.7 in) long culms and 1–2.2 millimetres (0.039–0.087 in) wide. The ligule is 3–7 millimetres (0.12–0.28 in) long and is going around the eciliate membrane. Leaf sheaths are smooth and have a hairy surface while the leaf-blades are straight but curved and are 0.7–1.6 centimetres (0.28–0.63 in) broad. The panicle is contracted, linear, inflorescenced and 9.5 centimetres (3.7 in) long with branches being as hairy as leaf-sheaths. The same is with leaf-blades, only they are also ribbed and have a pungent apex.

It hybrizes with F. gautieri giving rise to the natural hybrid, F. xpicoeuropeana.
