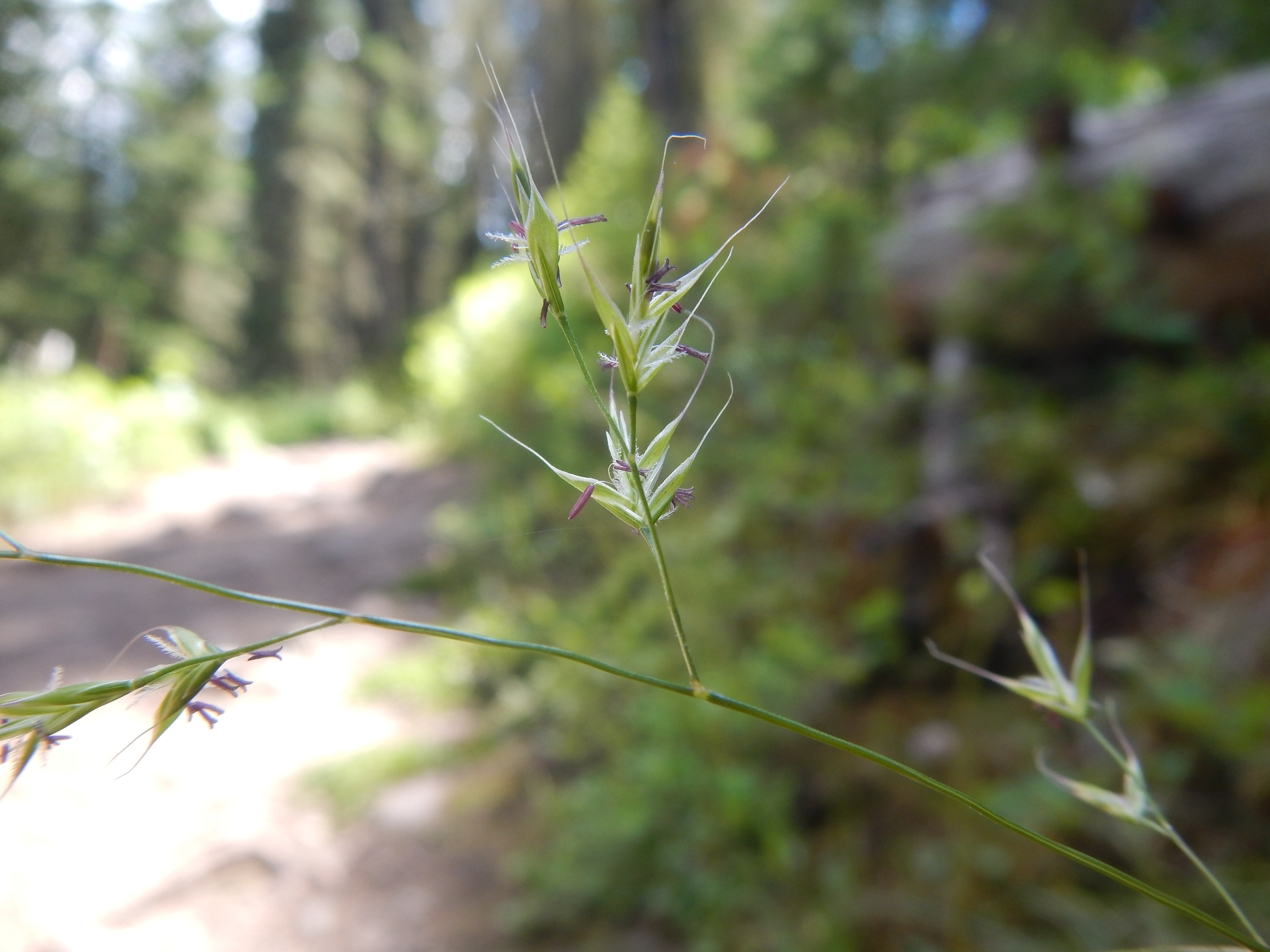

Scientific classification
- Kingdom: Plantae
- Clade: Tracheophytes
- Clade: Angiosperms
- Clade: Monocots
- Clade: Commelinids
- Order: Poales
- Family: Poaceae
- Subfamily: Pooideae
- Genus: Festuca
- Species: F. subulata

Binomial name
- Festuca subulata Trin.

= Festuca subulata =

Species of flowering plant

Festuca subulata is a species of grass known by the common names bearded fescue and nodding fescue. It is native to the northwestern quarter of North America, from Alaska to South Dakota to northern California, where it is most often found in moist mountain forests.

This fescue is a loosely clumping perennial grass with small rhizomes. The stems are generally between 40 and 80 centimeters in height and have drooping leaves. The inflorescence has loosely clustered spikelets. The plant reproduces by seed and rhizome and it sometimes spreads via stolon.
