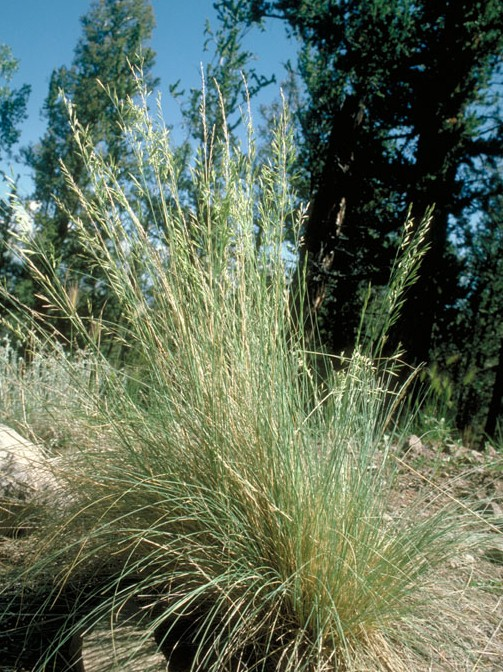

Conservation status
- Apparently Secure (NatureServe)

Scientific classification
- Kingdom: Plantae
- Clade: Tracheophytes
- Clade: Angiosperms
- Clade: Monocots
- Clade: Commelinids
- Order: Poales
- Family: Poaceae
- Subfamily: Pooideae
- Genus: Festuca
- Species: F. arizonica

Binomial name
- Festuca arizonica (Vasey) Hackel ex Beal

= Festuca arizonica =

Species of flowering plant

Festuca arizonica, commonly called Arizona fescue, is a grass found in western North America, in the southwest United States and northern Mexico. This species also has the common names mountain bunchgrass and pinegrass.

== Characteristics ==
This grass lacks rhizomes, but it has a large, fibrous root system and it can be used for erosion control. The stems can grow up to one meter tall, and are rough-textured and blue-green in color. The rough, blue-green leaf blades are "shaped like a string" and measure up to 10 inches long. The inflorescence is a branching array up to 20 centimeters long, which may appear narrow or somewhat open in shape.

== Description ==
This grass grows on loams, including clay loams, and gravelly and sandy soil types. It usually grows in ecosystems dominated by the ponderosa pine. It may grow alongside blue grama and mountain muhly grasses. Festuca arizonica is tolerant of both shade and drought conditions.

This species is somewhat palatable to domestic ungulates and provides forage for wild animals such as deer and bighorn sheep. It can be planted in revegetation efforts on reclaimed land such as mine spoils, provided the area receives adequate precipitation. It can also be used as an ornamental grass in gardens, but it does not tolerate trampling. The cultivar 'Redondo' is available.
