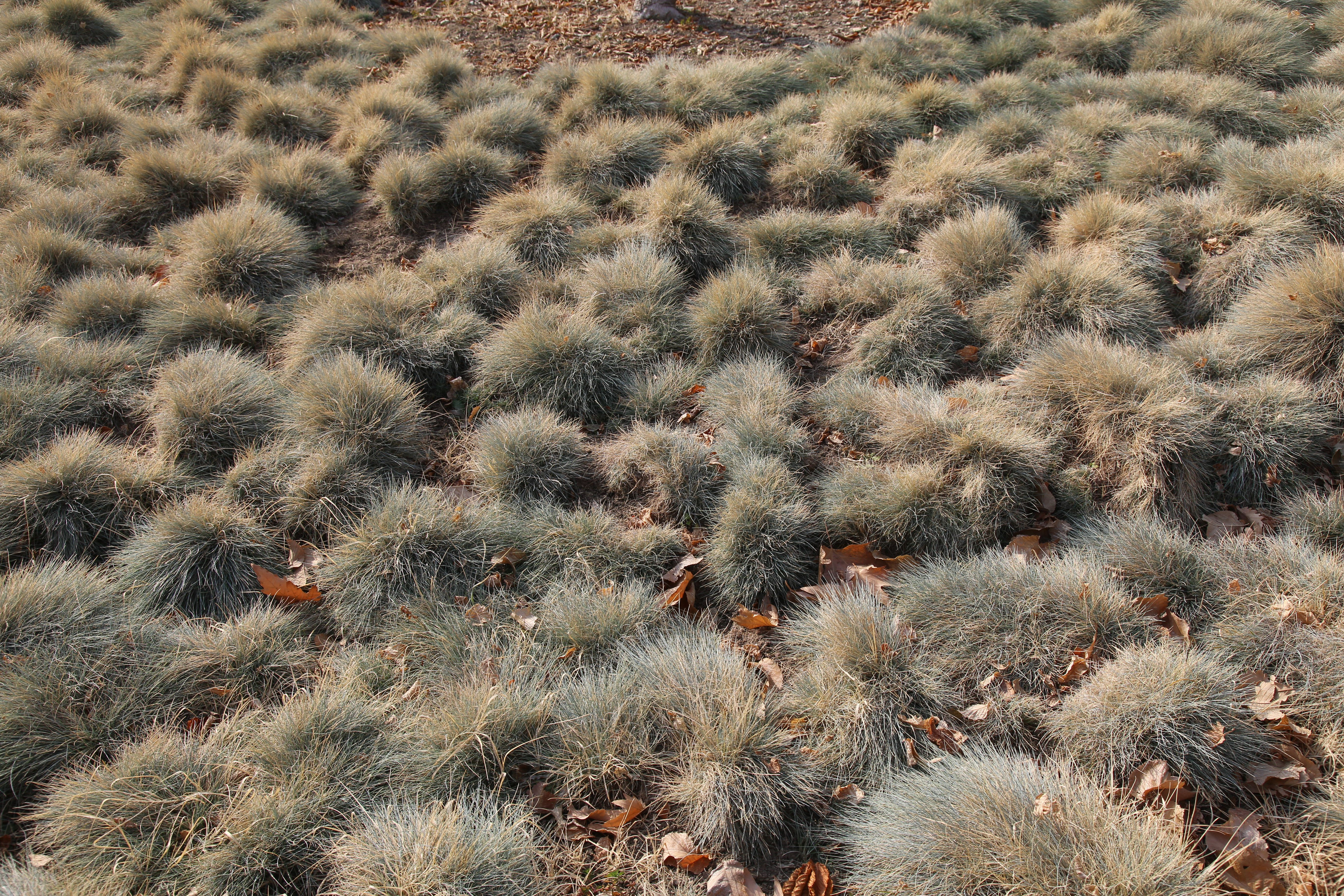

Scientific classification
- Kingdom: Plantae
- Clade: Tracheophytes
- Clade: Angiosperms
- Clade: Monocots
- Clade: Commelinids
- Order: Poales
- Family: Poaceae
- Subfamily: Pooideae
- Genus: Festuca
- Species: F. glauca

Binomial name
- Festuca glauca Vill.

= Festuca glauca =

Blue fescue

Species of grass

Festuca glauca, commonly known as blue fescue, is a species of flowering plant in the grass family, Poaceae. It is a commonly cultivated evergreen or semi-evergreen herbaceous perennial.

== Range ==
Blue fescue is native to France, Italy, Spain, and Switzerland.

== Etymology ==
Common names include blue fescue, blue mountain grass, and grey fescue. It was originally described by French naturalist Dominique Villars.

The genus name Festuca means 'straw', and is a name that was used by Pliny the Elder. 'Festuca' also refers to a rod used to manumit Romans from slavery to freedom.

The species name glauca is derived from Latin and means 'with a white or greyish bloom', or 'glaucous'. It is a cognate of the word 'glaucoma'.

== Description ==
F. glauca is a perennial clump-forming ornamental grass noted for its glaucous, finely-textured, blue-gray foliage. The foliage forms a dome-shaped, porcupine-like tuft of erect to arching, needle-like 9-ribbed blades, radiating upward and outward to a length of 140–180 mm. Light green flowers with a purple tinge appear in terminal panicles atop stems rising above the foliage in late spring to early summer, but inflorescences are not very showy. Flowers give way to puffy wheat-like seed-heads.

== Cultivation ==
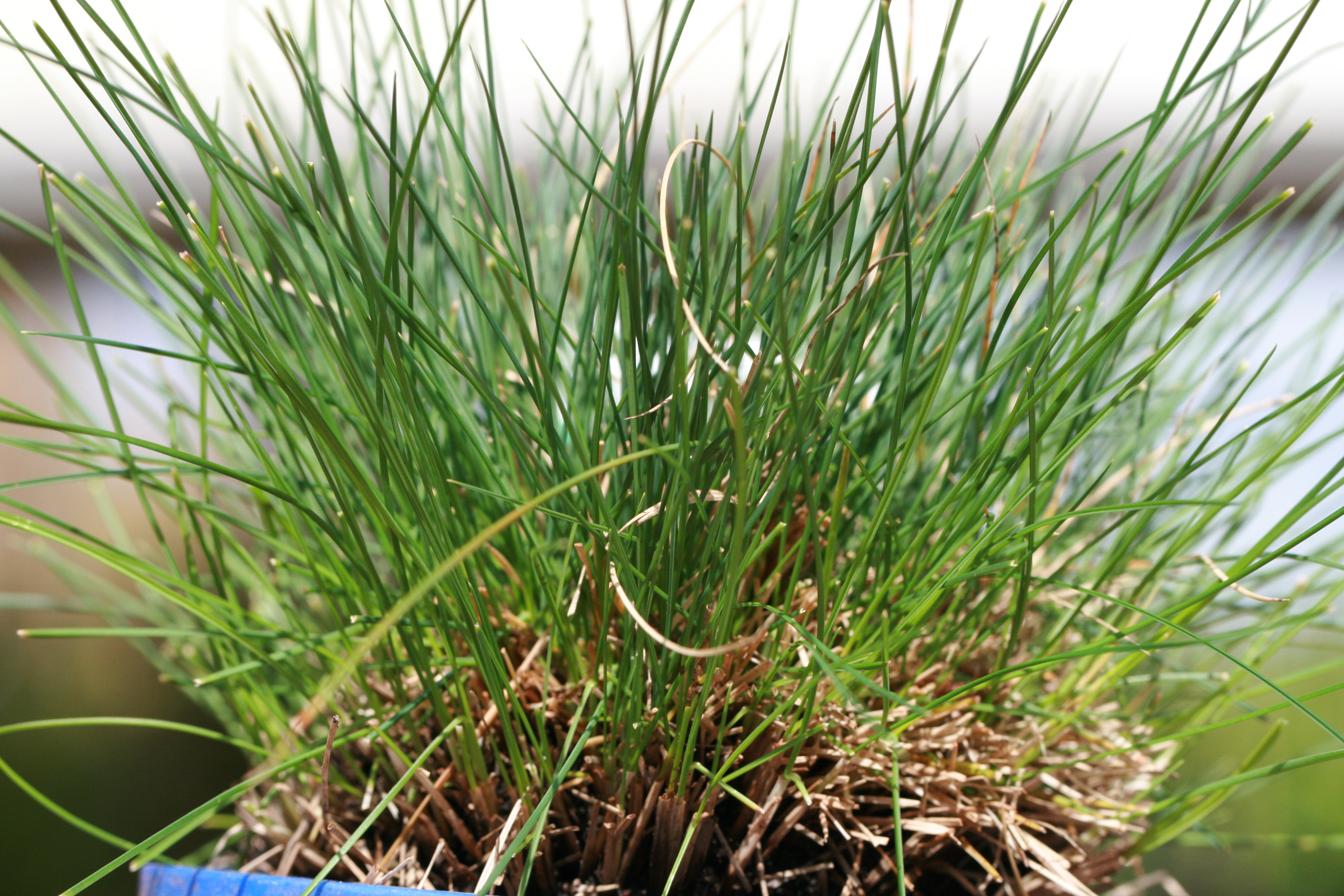
F. glauca on sale in a nursery

In cultivation F. glauca can reach a height of 14–18 cm (6–7 in) (inflorescences typically bring total clump height to 20–25 cm (8–10 in)). It does best in well-draining soil as plants will not grow well in wet soils. It tolerates dry and low nutrient soils. Plant in a full sun for best foliage colour. It will also grow in a lightly shaded position. Will tolerate drought, neglect and lack of nutrients but prefers regular watering. If plant has a large amount of dead leaves, prune back to 40mm from ground level. This is to be done in winter. Lift and divide clumps if needed (also to be done in winter). Division of established clumps in winter is the easiest method although plants can also be grown from seed.

Plants require frequent division as clumps tend to die out in the center and need to be divided, replanted or replaced every 2–3 years. Plant foliage may decline considerably in very hot, humid summers. Weeds often build up amongst the clumps when used as groundcover and need to be removed by hand.
