= Festuca lemanii =

Scientific classification
- Kingdom: Plantae
- Clade: Tracheophytes
- Clade: Angiosperms
- Clade: Monocots
- Clade: Commelinids
- Order: Poales
- Family: Poaceae
- Subfamily: Pooideae
- Genus: Festuca
- Species: F. lemanii

Binomial name
- Festuca lemanii T.Bastard

Synonyms
- Festuca ovina subvar. lemanii (T.Bastard) Krajina in Acta Bot. Bohem. 9: 189 (1930); Festuca ovina f. lemanii (T.Bastard) Hack. in Monogr. Festuc. Eur.: 87 (1882); Festuca bastardii Kerguélen & Plonka in Bull. Soc. Bot. Centre-Ouest, n.s., 19: 16 (1988); Festuca duriuscula var. cinerea Lej. in Rev. Fl. Spa: 21 (1825), not validly publ.; Festuca duriuscula var. lemanii (Bastard) Doumenjou in Herb. Montagne Noire: 303 (1847); Festuca lemanii var. ciliata Lej. in Fl. Spa 2: 292 (1813); Festuca ourtana Lej. in Fl. Spa 1: 57 (1811); Festuca ovina var. lemanii (Bastard) Nyman in Consp. Fl. Eur.: 829 (1882); Festuca prasina Dumort. in Observ. Gramin. Belg.: 102 (1824); Festuca rubra var. lemanii (Bastard) Chevall. in Fl. Gén. Env. Paris 2: 165 (1827)

Species of grass

Festuca lemanii, also known as the confused fescue, is a species of grass in the family Poaceae. It is native to Belgium, France, Great Britain, and Netherlands. It is doubtfully present in Spain. It is perennial and prefers to grow in temperate biomes. Festuca lemanii was first published in 1809.
