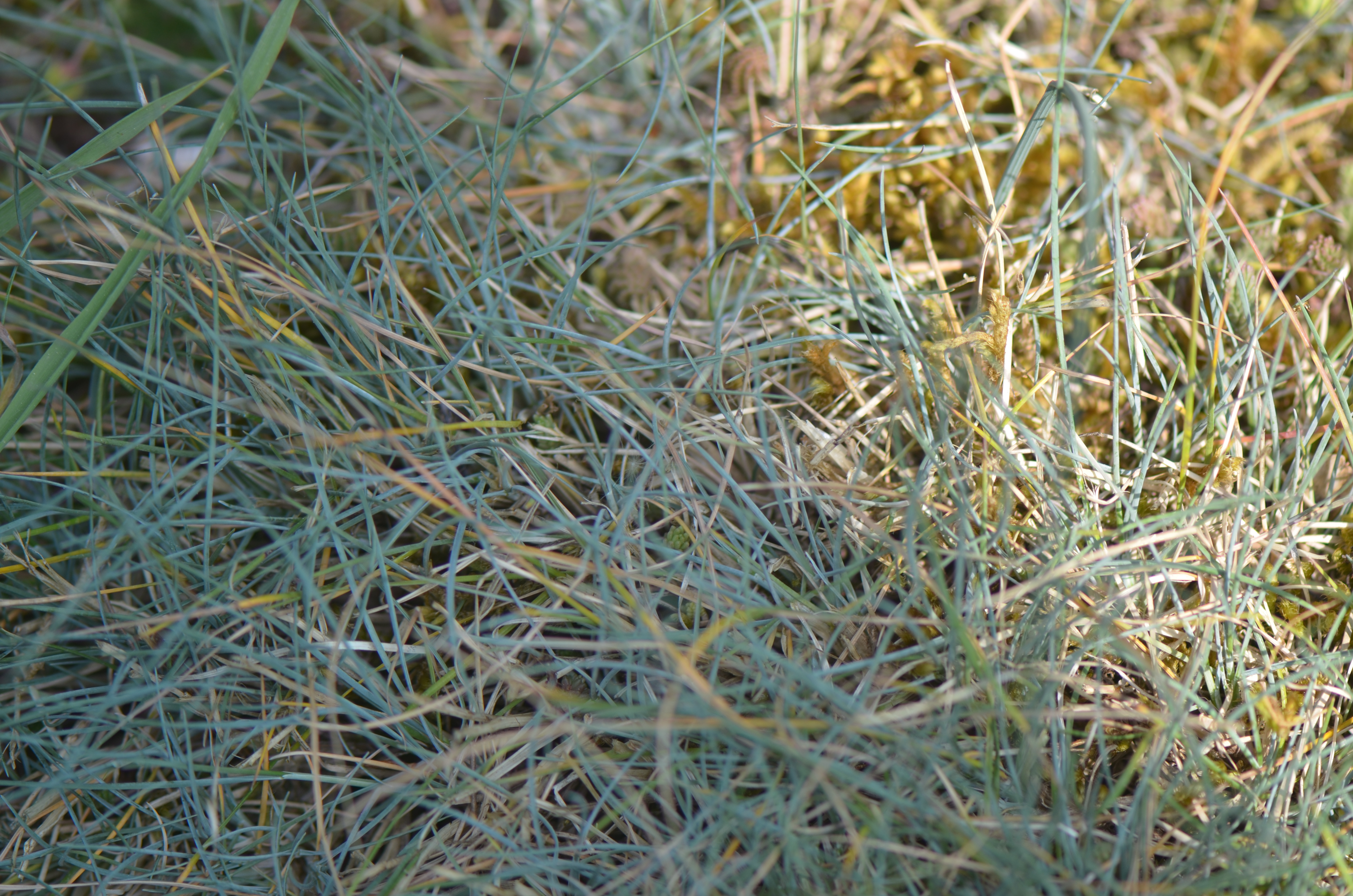

Scientific classification
- Kingdom: Plantae
- Clade: Tracheophytes
- Clade: Angiosperms
- Clade: Monocots
- Clade: Commelinids
- Order: Poales
- Family: Poaceae
- Subfamily: Pooideae
- Genus: Festuca
- Species: F. longifolia

Binomial name
- Festuca longifolia Thuill.

Synonyms
- Festuca caesia Sm.

= Festuca longifolia =

Species of grass

Festuca longifolia, known in Britain and Ireland as blue fescue, is a species of grass which is native to Channel Islands and Southern Devon. It was described by Auquier in 1977.
