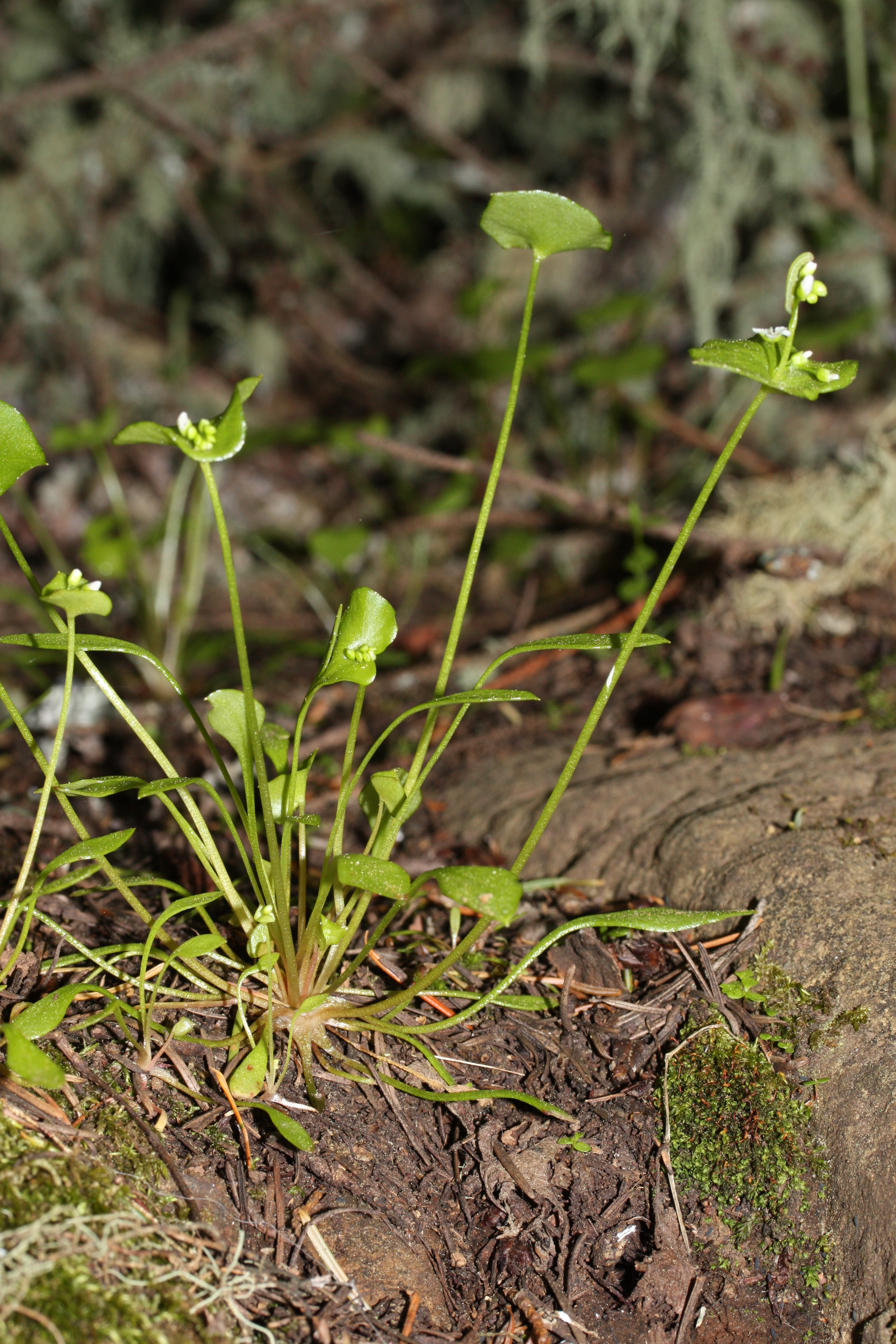
- C. perfoliata subsp. perfoliata growing wild in Anacortes, Washington

Conservation status
- Secure (NatureServe)

Scientific classification
- Kingdom: Plantae
- Clade: Tracheophytes
- Clade: Angiosperms
- Clade: Eudicots
- Order: Caryophyllales
- Family: Montiaceae
- Genus: Claytonia
- Species: C. perfoliata

Binomial name
- Claytonia perfoliata Donn ex Willd.

Subspecies
- C. perfoliata subsp. intermontana; C. perfoliata subsp. mexicana; C. perfoliata subsp. perfoliata

Synonyms
- List: Claytonia adsurgens (Suksd.) Holub; Claytonia cubensis Bonpl.; Claytonia platyphylla (Rydb.) Holub; Claytonia tolucana Holub; Limnia adsurgens (Suksd.) Rydb.; Limnia angustifolia (Greene) Rydb.; Limnia carnosa (Greene) A.Heller ex Rydb.; Limnia cuprea A.Heller; Limnia guadalupensis Rydb.; Limnia membranacea Rydb.; Limnia mexicana Rydb.; Limnia perfoliata (Donn ex Willd.) Haw.; Limnia platyphylla Rydb.; Limnia viae (A.Nelson) A.Heller; Montia mexicana (Rydb.) Pax & K.Hoffm.; Montia perfoliata (Donn ex Willd.) Howell; Montia platyphylla (Rydb.) Pax & K.Hoffm.; Montia viae A.Nelson

= Claytonia perfoliata =

Plant species in the springbeauty family

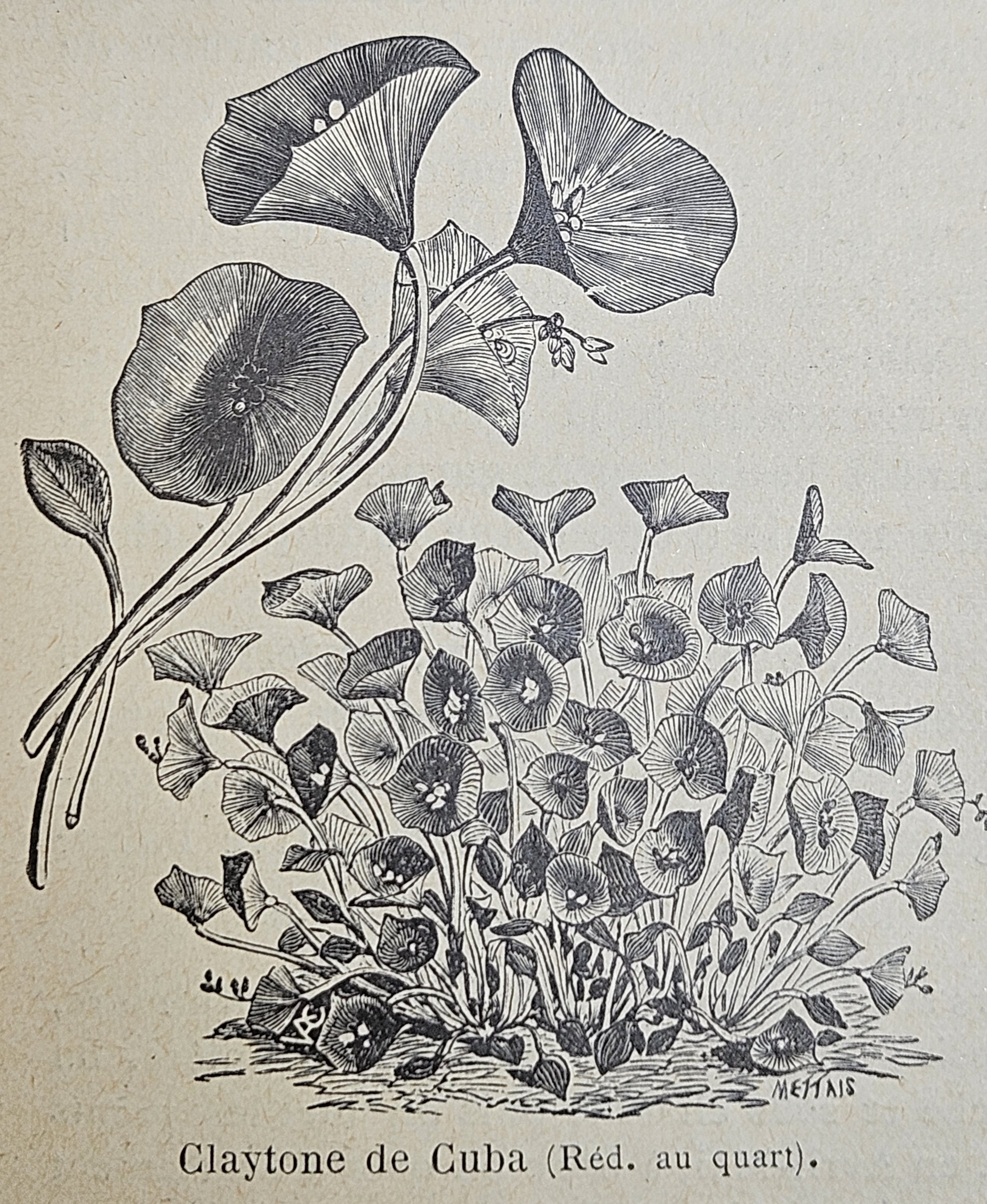
Illustration of Claytone de Cuba (Claytonia perfoliata) in "Les Plantes potagères" Vilmorin 1925

Claytonia perfoliata, commonly known as miner's lettuce, rooreh, or winter purslane, is a flowering plant in the family Montiaceae. It is an edible, fleshy, herbaceous, annual plant native to the western mountain and coastal regions of North America.

== Description ==
Claytonia perfoliata is a tender rosette-forming plant that grows to some 30 centimetres (12 inches) in height, but mature plants can be as short as 1 cm (3/8 in). The cotyledons are usually bright green (rarely purplish- or brownish-green), succulent, long and narrow. The first true leaves form a rosette at the base of the plant, and are 0.5 to 4 cm (1/4 to 1 5/8 in) long, with a typically long petiole (exceptionally up to 20 cm or 8 in long).

The small pink or white flowers have five petals 2 to 6 millimetres (1/16 to 1/4 in) long. The flowers appear from February to May or June and are grouped 5–40 together. The flowers grow above a pair of leaves that are connected together around the stem so as to appear as a single circular leaf. Mature plants form a rosette; they have numerous erect to spreading stems that branch from the base.

C. perfoliata is common in the springtime, and prefers a cool, damp environment. The plant first appears in sunlit areas after the first heavy rains of the year, though the best stands are found in shaded areas, especially in the uplands, into early summer. As the days get hotter and drier, the leaves turn a deep red color as they dry out.

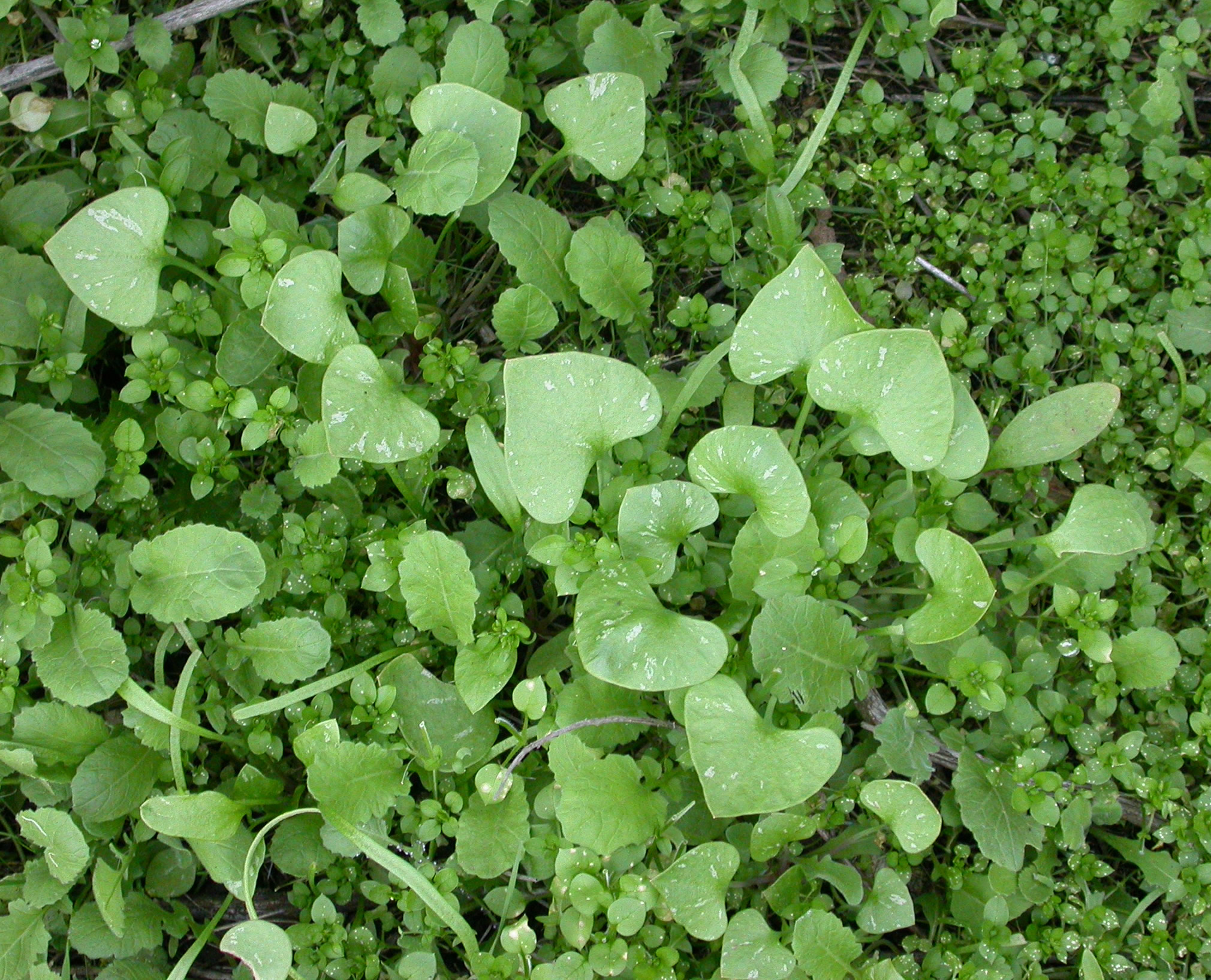
The basal leaves are petiolate and cordate.

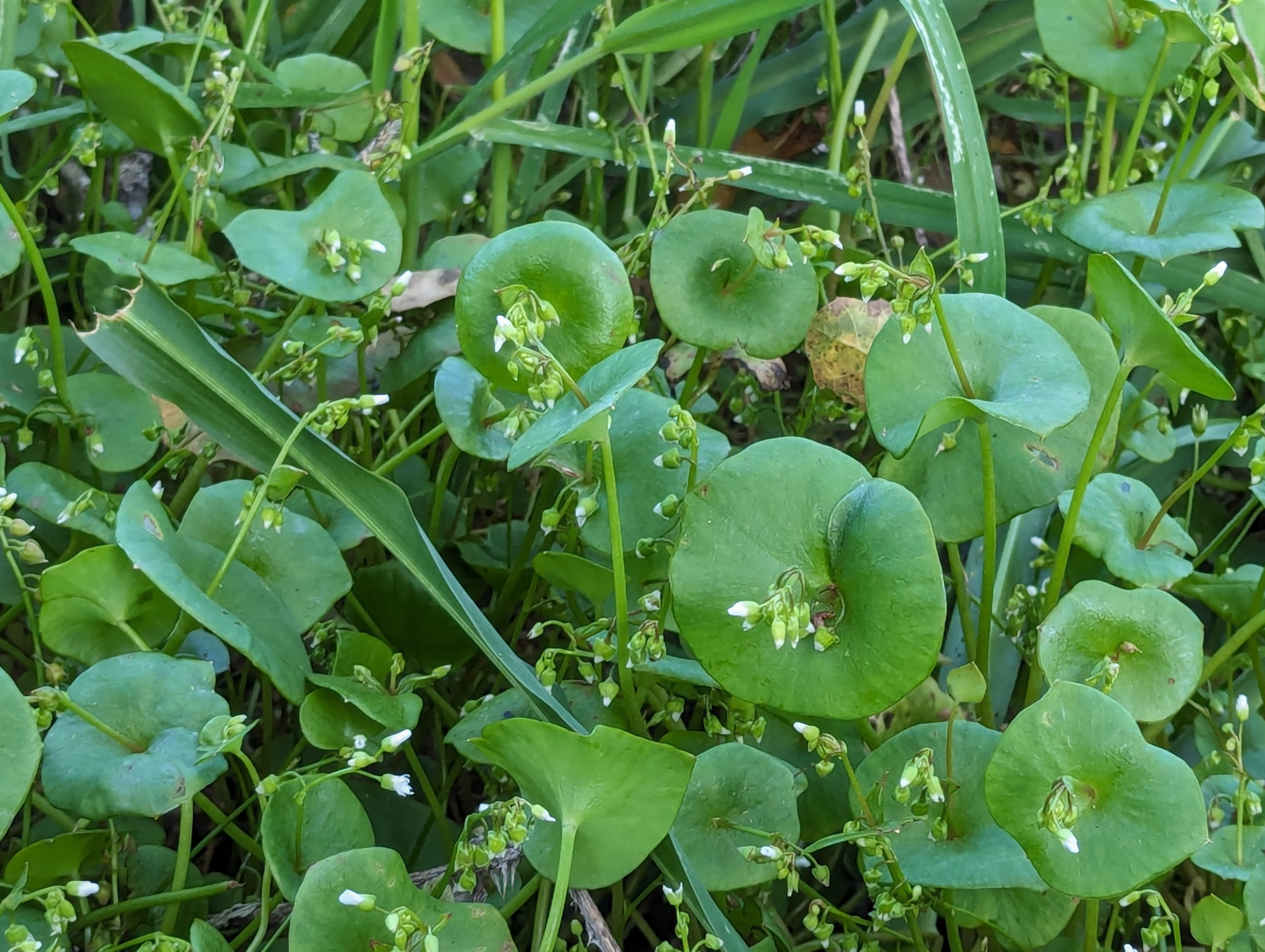
The cauline leaves are perfoliate.

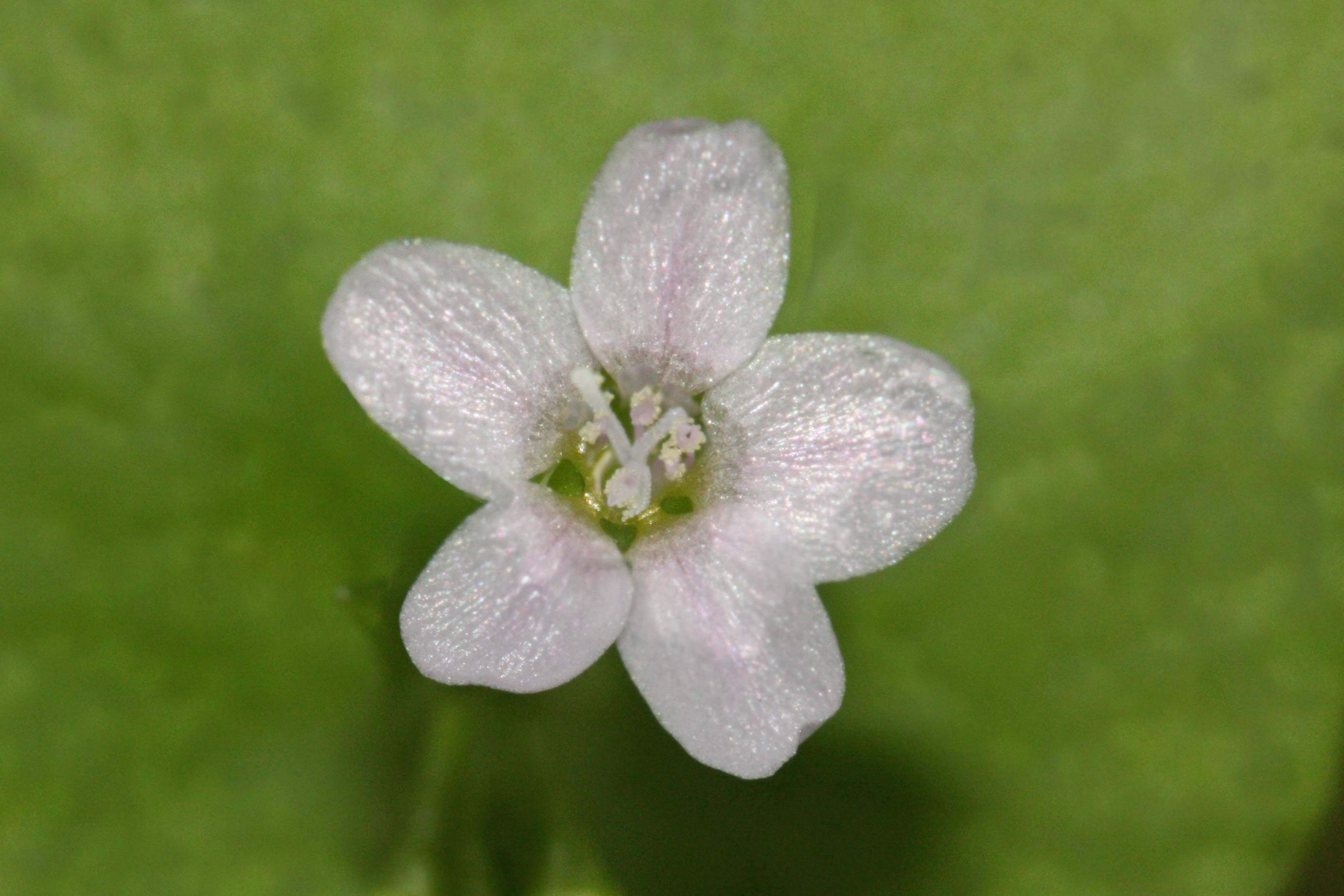
Close-up of flower

== Taxonomy ==
Together with two other Claytonia species, Claytonia parviflora and C. rubra, C. perfoliata comprises what is almost certainly a polyploid pillar complex, which is based on three diploid species. Two key studies on the population ecology and genetics of the C. perfoliata complex were published in 2012.

=== Subspecies ===
There are three well-studied geographical subspecies of C. perfoliata:

- Claytonia perfoliata subsp. perfoliata: Pacific coastal United States and Canada (British Columbia)
- Claytonia perfoliata subsp. intermontana: interior western United States
- Claytonia perfoliata subsp. mexicana: coastal southern California and Arizona, all the way south to Mexico to Guatemala

=== Names ===
The genus Claytonia is named in honor of the American botanist John Clayton. The specific epithet perfoliata means perfoliate.

The common name miner's lettuce is attributed to the use of Claytonia perfoliata during the California gold rush, however its first known use in print does not occur until 1921 in the writings of Gene Stratton-Porter. The name winter purslane first occurs earlier in 1884 in the Dictionary of English Names of Plants by William Miller.

C. perfoliata is called 'piyada̠' in the Western Mono language and 'palsingat' in Ivilyuat — two Native American languages of California or 'rooreh' in (Ohlone language) The name rooreh has been adopted by the Jepson Herbarium at University of California, Berkeley.

== Distribution and habitat ==
The species is native to Mexico and western north America as far north as British Columbia.

It has been introduced into and is widely naturalized in western Europe, Argentina and New Zealand It was introduced to Europe in the 18th century, possibly by the naturalist Archibald Menzies, who brought it to Kew Gardens in London in 1794. It was first recorded in the wild in Britain in South Hampshire in 1849 and is still spreading.

As of 2019 sightings of this plant have been found as far inland as Arkansas.

== Uses ==
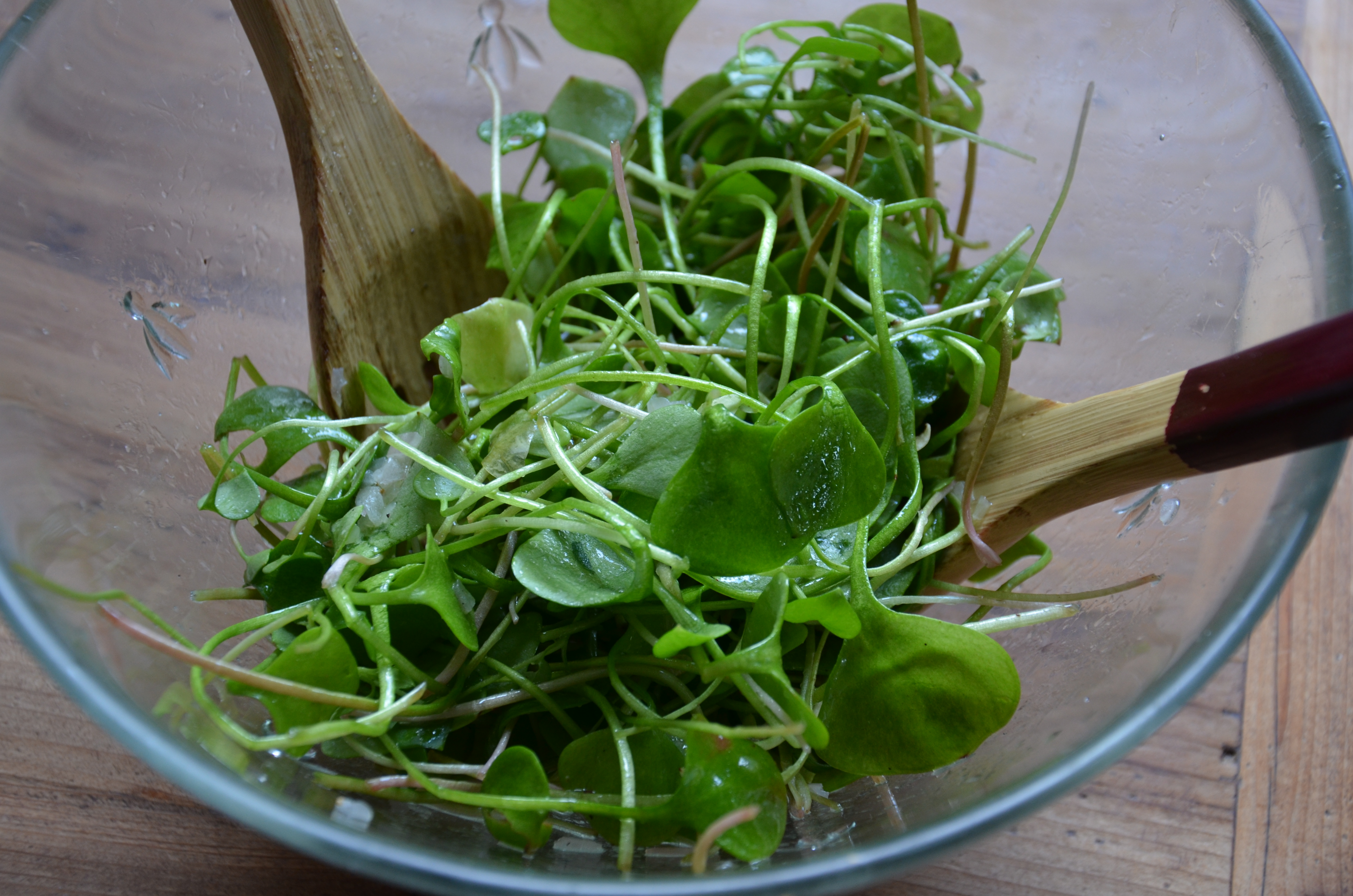
Miner's lettuce served as a salad

The common name of miner's lettuce refers to how the plant was used by miners during the California Gold Rush, who ate it to prevent scurvy. It is in season in April and May, and can be eaten as a leaf vegetable. The entire plant is edible, except the roots, and it provides vitamin C. Most commonly, it is eaten raw in salads, but it is not quite as delicate as cultivated lettuce. Sometimes, it is boiled like spinach, which it resembles in taste and chemical composition. Caution should be used because wild C. perfoliata can sometimes accumulate toxic amounts of sodium oxalate (as can happen in spinach).

The plant is known as palsingat or, possibly, lahchumeek in Ivilyuat and it was eaten fresh or boiled as a green by the Ivilyuqaletem (Cahuilla) people of Southern California. It, along with Claytonia exigua, is available for gathering in the early spring.
