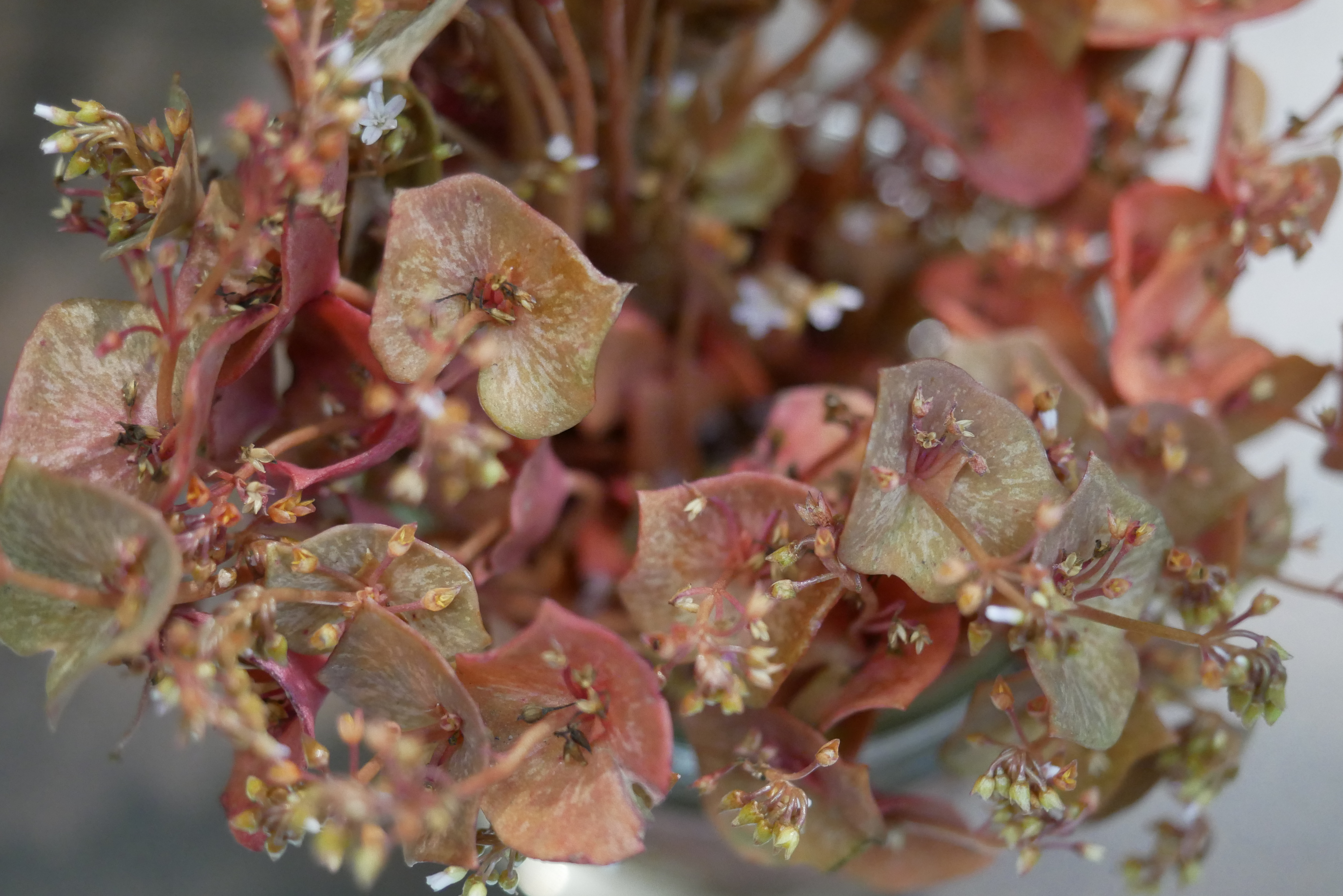

Conservation status
- Secure (NatureServe)

Scientific classification
- Kingdom: Plantae
- Clade: Tracheophytes
- Clade: Angiosperms
- Clade: Eudicots
- Order: Caryophyllales
- Family: Montiaceae
- Genus: Claytonia
- Species: C. rubra

Binomial name
- Claytonia rubra (Howell) Tidestr.

Subspecies
- C. rubra subsp. depressa; C. rubra subsp. rubra

Synonyms
- List: Claytonia cupulata; Claytonia depressa; Claytonia humifusa; Claytonia interrupta; Claytonia latifolia; Claytonia parviflora subsp. depressa; Claytonia parvifolia var. depressa; Claytonia perfoliata var. rubra; Limnia depressa; Limnia humifusa; Limnia interrupta; Limnia rubra; Montia depressa; Montia humifusa; Montia interrupta; Montia latifolia; Montia rubra

= Claytonia rubra =

Plant species in the springbeauty family

Claytonia rubra is a species of wildflower in the springbeauty family known by the common names redstem springbeauty and red miner's lettuce. It is native to western North America from southwestern Canada to the United States of America extending from The Black Hills and western slopes of the Rocky Mountains to the Cascade and Coast Range, Ochoco and Wallowa Mountains south to the Warner Mountains, Yolla Bolly Mountains, and Sierra Nevada and Transverse Ranges [Mt. Pinos and Mt. San Gorgonio], where it is found in coniferous forests and shrublands.

== Description ==
Claytonia rubra is usually a spring annual or occasionally biennial plant that overwinters. Overwintering plants will have an extremely small tuber. Its stems can be 1 to 20 centimeters long.

All the plant's basal leaves, those growing directly from the base of the plant, are attached by tapering petioles, leaf stems. They form a rosette that lays flat to the ground or occasionally is somewhat erect. The stems and leaf blades can be green, pink, or a strong beet-red and are usually 12 to 48 in number, but occasionally as few as two or with more than 48 leaves in overwintering plants. The shape of the leaves varies from narrowly rhombic to ovate, diamond shaped attached at one of the narrow angles to shaped like an egg with the wider portion at the base. Though they can also be spatulate, spoon shaped, or trullate, shaped like a mason's trowel. They measure 0.2–2 centimeters long by 0.2–2.5 cm wide.

There are also leaves on the flowering stems which may be rounded or squared and sometimes fuse together to create a bowl around the stem with a diameter of 0.5–10 centimeters. All the leaves possess blunt (obtuse) tips according to published descriptions and taxonomic treatments.

Each inflorescence has a single bract that is leaflike and measures 0.3–8 millimeters long. The flowers are very small, just 2–5 mm in diameter with petals that are 2–3 mm. The flowers are white to pink-tinted in color.

== Taxonomy ==
Claytonia rubra was scientifically described by the botanist Thomas J. Howell and named Montia rubra in 1893. It was given its current name by Ivar Tidestrom in 1925.

Together with Claytonia perfoliata and Claytonia parviflora, Claytonia rubra comprises what is almost certainly a polyploid pillar complex based on three diploid species, each occupying a definitive ecological niche. The species is listed as accepted by Plants of the World Online, World Flora Online, and World Plants. However, the status as a species is not without controversy. In 2012 Noel H. Holmgren and co-authors treated two of the three species as C. perfoliata in volume 2, A of Intermountain Flora writing, "The extreme polymorphism of this abundant, often weedy, notoriously difficult species complex defies separation into meaningful infraspecific units, as proposed by Miller and Chambers." John M. Miller and Kenton L. Chambers having published a monograph on Claytonia in 2006 where they had written about C. rubra, "We agree with Tidestrom (1925) that this taxon is distinct from C. perfoliata, although other workers have recognized it as a variety of C. perfoliata." It is classified in the Montiaceae family with the rest of the Claytonia genus.

=== Subspecies ===
There are two accepted subspecies of Claytonia rubra.

==== Claytonia rubra subsp. depressa ====
This subspecies was scientifically described in 1887 by Asa Gray as a variety of Claytonia parviflora with the name Claytonia parviflora var. depressa. This subspecies grows along sandy areas of the Pacific coast as well as with sagebrush in the Channeled Scablands of the Pacific Northwest. It also is found along river banks and in fallow fields. It is generally found at lower elevations than subspecies rubra.

==== Claytonia rubra subsp. rubra. ====
The autonymic subspecies consistently has trowel shaped basal leaves. It grows in somewhat dry conditions in coniferous forests, mainly ponderosa pine forests, but also with Jeffrey pines, Douglas firs, and white firs. They are also found under shrubs in moist mountain canyons in the Intermountain West and in quaking aspen groves. They may also be found on moist slopes at the bases of cliffs or under Great Basin sagebrush bushes. It has a wide elevation range, from as low at 500 meters (1,600 ft) up to 2,500 m (8,200 ft).

=== Synonyms ===
Claytonia rubra has 26 synonyms of the species or one of its two subspecies.

Table of Synonyms
Name	Year	Rank	Synonym of:	Notes
Claytonia cupulata Suksd.	1923	species	subsp. depressa	= het.
Claytonia depressa (A.Gray) Suksd.	1898	species	subsp. depressa	= het., pro syn.
Claytonia depressa var. arenaria Suksd.	1898	variety	subsp. depressa	= het., not validly publ.
Claytonia depressa var. interrupta Suksd.	1898	variety	subsp. depressa	= het., pro syn.
Claytonia depressa var. latifolia Suksd.	1898	variety	subsp. depressa	= het., pro syn.
Claytonia depressa var. silvatica Suksd.	1898	variety	subsp. rubra	= het., not validly publ.
Claytonia humifusa (Howell) Holub	1975	species	subsp. depressa	= het.
Claytonia interrupta (Suksd.) Suksd.	1923	species	subsp. depressa	= het.
Claytonia latifolia (Suksd.) Suksd.	1923	species	subsp. depressa	= het., nom. illeg.
Claytonia parviflora subsp. depressa (A.Gray) Piper	1906	subspecies	subsp. depressa	= het.
Claytonia parviflora var. depressa A.Gray	1887	variety	subsp. depressa	= het.
Claytonia parvifolia var. depressa A.Gray	1887	variety	subsp. depressa	≡ hom.
Claytonia perfoliata var. amplectens Greene	1891	variety	subsp. rubra	= het.
Claytonia perfoliata var. depressa (A.Gray) Poelln.	1932	variety	subsp. depressa	= het.
Claytonia perfoliata var. rubra (Howell) Poelln.	1932	variety	C. rubra	≡ hom.
Limnia depressa (A.Gray) Rydb.	1906	species	subsp. depressa	= het.
Limnia humifusa (Howell) Rydb.	1931	species	subsp. depressa	= het.
Limnia interrupta (Suksd.) Rydb.	1932	species	subsp. depressa	= het.
Limnia rubra (Howell) A.Heller	1910	species	C. rubra	≡ hom.
Montia depressa (A.Gray) Suksd.	1898	species	subsp. depressa	= het.
Montia humifusa Howell	1897	species	subsp. depressa	= het.
Montia interrupta Suksd.	1898	species	subsp. depressa	= het.
Montia latifolia Suksd.	1898	species	subsp. depressa	= het.
Montia parviflora var. depressa (A.Gray) B.L.Rob.	1897	variety	subsp. depressa	= het.
Montia perfoliata var. depressa (A.Gray) Jeps.	1914	variety	subsp. depressa	= het.
Montia rubra Howell	1893	species	C. rubra	≡ hom.
Notes: ≡ homotypic synonym; = heterotypic synonym

=== Names ===
In English it is known by the similar common names of redstem springbeauty, red-stem springbeauty, and red-stemmed spring-beauty. Alternatively it can be called red miner's lettuce, a common name that indicates the reddish cast of the stems and leaves of this species. It is also occasionally known as erubescent miner's-lettuce.

== Range and habitat ==
Redstem springbeauty grows in many parts of the western United States and into the province of British Columbia in western Canada. In British Columbia it is found in the Okanogan Region and on Vancouver Island. Its native range includes most of Washington and Oregon on both sides of the Cascade Range, but more commonly east of the range. The species grows in all the mountainous part of California including the North Coast, the Klamath Ranges, the north and south Coast Ranges, in the Sierra Nevada, the Transverse Ranges, and even in the Warner Mountains and the White Mountains. The southernmost known population is on Mount Pinos in California.

To the east in Nevada, redstem springbeauty is found in many of the state's mountain ranges including Pine Forest, the Ruby Mountains, Santa Rosa, East Humboldt, Wild Horse, Monitor, Wassuk, and the Independence Mountains. Likewise it has been reported from most parts of Idaho, but mostly in the western portions of Montana and a few widespread locations in Wyoming. In Utah it is found in mountainous areas including the Canyon Mountains, the Pahvant Range, the Pine Valley Mountains, the Tushar Mountains, and the Wasatch Range. It also grows in the Black Hills of South Dakota. In Colorado it is only known from three Front Range counties, Douglas, Jefferson, and Boulder.

== Ecology ==
Redstem springbeauty shows a preference for a particular elevation with fewer plants emerging and smaller sizes when planted at different elevations in experiments.
