= Claytonia tuberosa =

Conservation status
- Apparently Secure (NatureServe)

Scientific classification
- Kingdom: Plantae
- Clade: Tracheophytes
- Clade: Angiosperms
- Clade: Eudicots
- Order: Caryophyllales
- Family: Montiaceae
- Genus: Claytonia
- Species: C. tuberosa

Binomial name
- Claytonia tuberosa Pall. ex Schult.

Synonyms
- Claytonia caroliniana var. tuberosa

Plant species in the springbeauty family

Claytonia tuberosa, commonly known as Beringian springbeauty, Eskimo potato, or tuberous springbeauty, (Inupiaq: oatkuk, ulqit, utqiq, ulqiq) is a species of flowering plant in the family Montiaceae. It is a perennial herb indigenous to Alaska, British Columbia, Northwest Territories, and the Yukon of North America, westward to East Asia–Siberia. The perennial grows from a globose tuberous root to a height of 15 centimetres (6 in) and bears several hermaphrodite white flowers on stems bearing a single pair of petiolate cauline leaves. Its closest relative is probably Claytonia virginica.

== Taxonomy ==
The scientific name of Claytonia tuberosa was published in 1819 by Josef August Schultes, who attributed it to Peter Simon Pallas. The species is classified in the Claytonia genus within the Montiaceae family. It has one synonym from 1966 when Joseph Robert Bernard Boivin published a description of it as a variety of Claytonia caroliniana.
