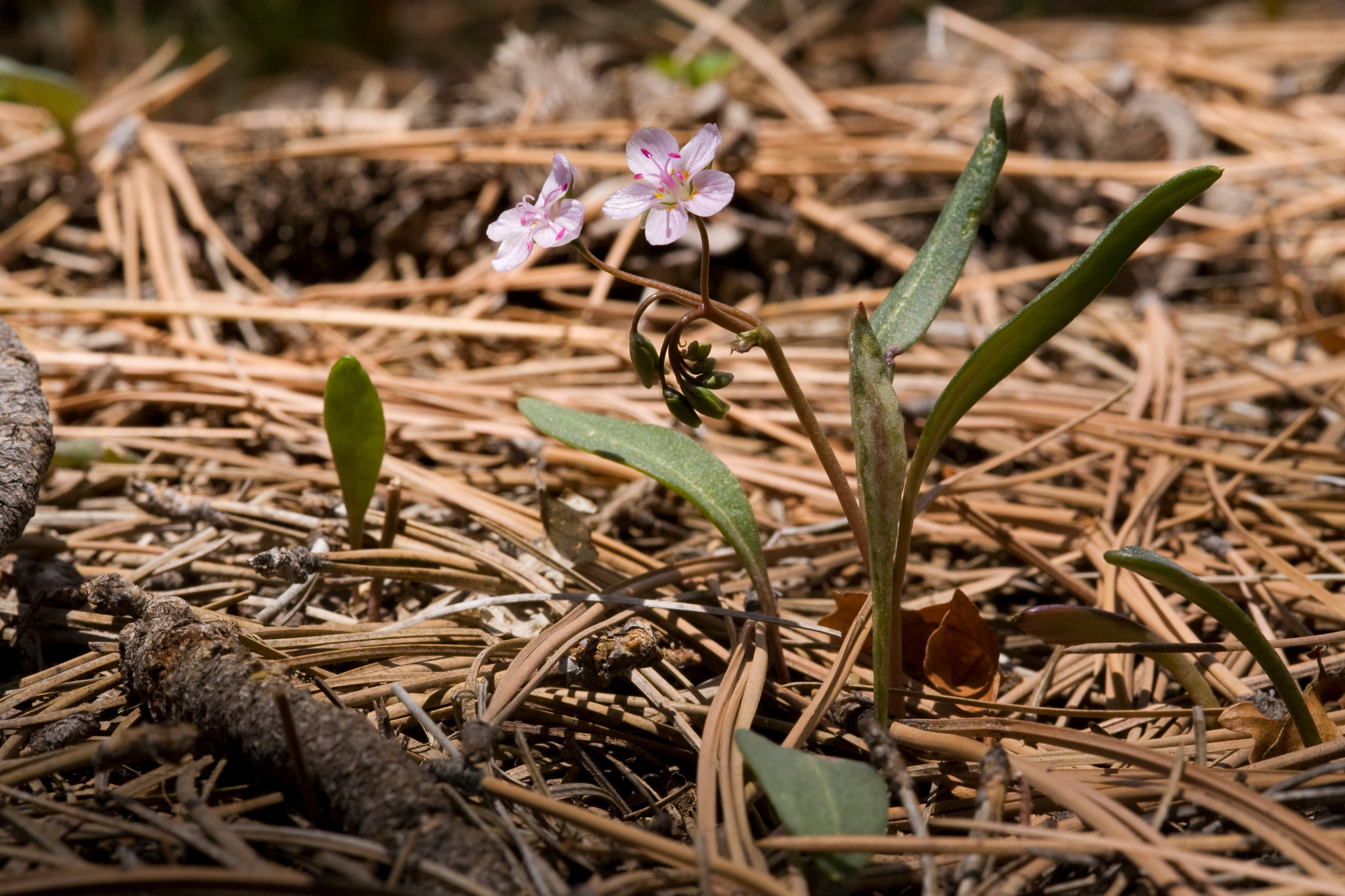
- Claytonia rosea flowering in San Juan National Forest, Colorado

Conservation status
- Apparently Secure (NatureServe)

Scientific classification
- Kingdom: Plantae
- Clade: Tracheophytes
- Clade: Angiosperms
- Clade: Eudicots
- Order: Caryophyllales
- Family: Montiaceae
- Genus: Claytonia
- Species: C. rosea

Binomial name
- Claytonia rosea Rydb.

Synonyms
- Claytonia lanceolata var. rosea (Rydb.) R.J.Davis

= Claytonia rosea =

Plant species in the springbeauty family

Claytonia rosea, commonly called Rocky Mountain spring beauty, western springbeauty or Madrean springbeauty, is a diminutive spring blooming ephemeral plant with pale pink to magenta flowers. It grows a small round tuberous root and it one of the earliest wildflowers of spring in its range. It is found in dry meadows in forests of ponderosa and Chihuahuan pines, and moist ledges of mountain slopes of the Beaver Dam Mountains of Utah, Colorado Front Range, and Sierra Madre Occidental (including the Chiricahua Mountains), south and east to the Sierra Maderas del Carmen of Coahuila.

== Description ==
Claytonia rosea grow a small round tuber 20–100 mm in size with a corky or woody skin that is 5–10 mm thick to protect it. The stems can be 2–15 cm (0.8–6 in) long, but are absent when the plant is not large enough to flower. When the plant is young it will have leaves that rise directly from the soil on individual leaf stems (basal leaves). These basal leaves are blade linear to narrowly spatulate, 1–7 cm (0.39–2.8 in) long and 0.4–2 cm (0.2–0.8 in) wide. This difference helps to distinguish them from Claytonia lanceolata with its wider leaves. In addition, close examination of the leaves will show that C. rosea has leaves that are single ribbed or indistinctly triple ribbed in contrast to the distinctly triple ribbed leaves of C. lanceolata. When large enough to flower the basal leaves may be absent and instead there will be several leaf-like bracts that are attached to the flowering stem, the same blade linear shape and 2–5 cm (0.8–2 in) long. All of its leaves have a pointed end that may be slightly acute or obtuse. The leaves are fleshy/succulent, but not leathery.

=== Flowers and seeds ===
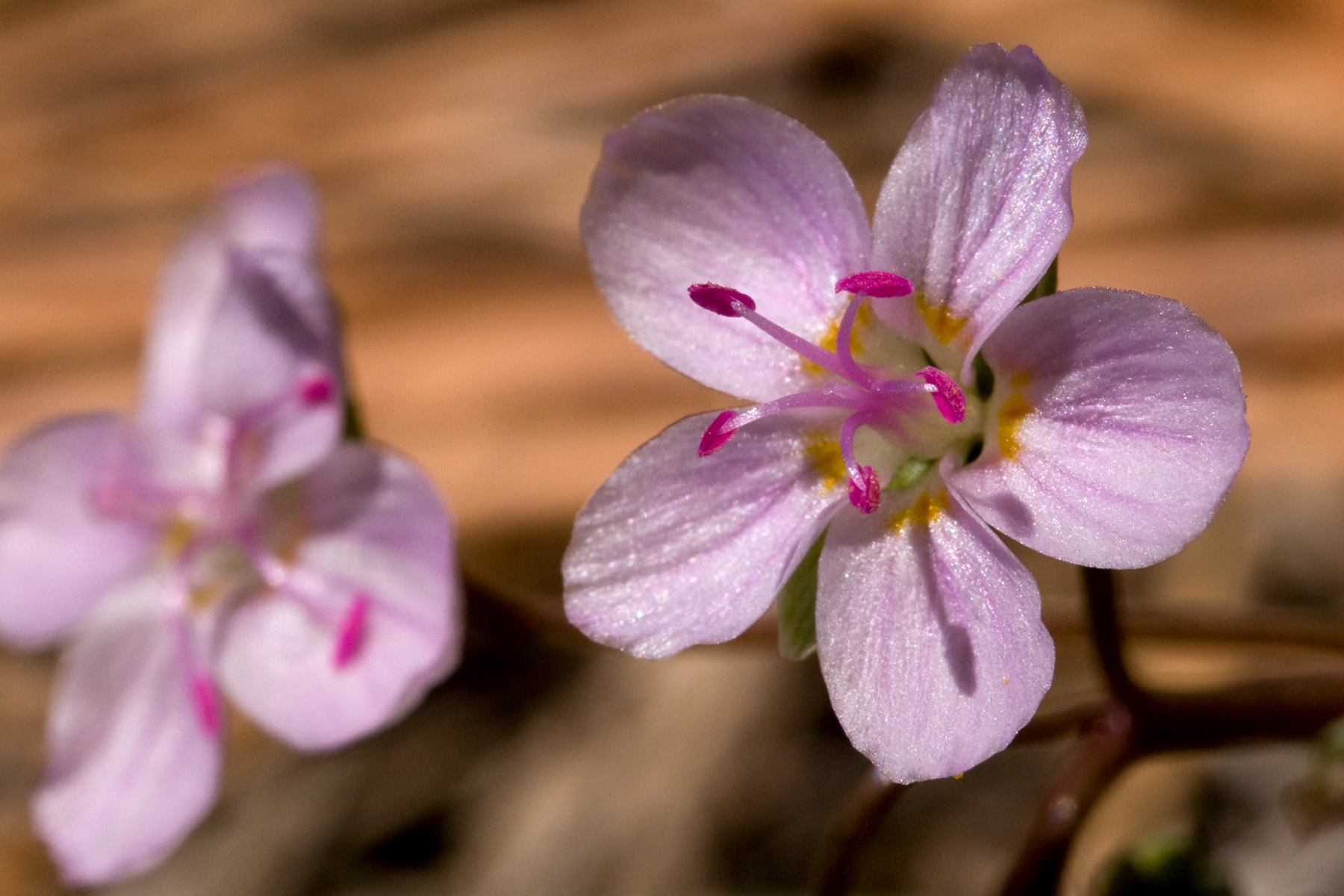
Claytonia rosea detail of flower

The flower or bud will usually have multiple bracts, though rarely there will be just one bract. The bract that is closest to the flower will be leaf like, while the more distant ones are reduced to thin scales. Each flowering stem (inflorescence) will have about five to ten flowers. The sepals that enclose the bud open to be 3–5 mm in length. Each flower is 8–14 mm across with five pastel colored petals in a shade of pink, rose, or magenta. The petals are 8–10 mm long and the flower will have six ovules. The flowers also have five stamens that have pink tips. In the central part of its range in Colorado it blooms from March to May, rarely as late June. In Arizona they bloom as early as February in the lower parts of its habitat and as late at May at higher elevations. The flowers only open during warm and sunny weather, closing at night and during cloudy or wet weather. In a few warm microclimates in on rocky outcrops or south facing bare ground in the foothills near Denver they will sometimes bloom as early as the first of January and may do so in similar situations in other parts of their range.

The seeds of Claytonia rosea are very small, 2–3 mm, about the same size as a poppy seed. They are smooth, shiny, black in color, and shaped like a lens. The seeds have a 1–2 mm elaiosome, a fleshy structure that is usually associated with ant dispersal of seeds. The seed capsules have three valves.

== Taxonomy ==
Claytonia rosea was described by Per Axel Rydberg in 1904. In 1966 Ray J. Davis published an article classifying it as Claytonia lanceolata var. rosea in the journal Brittonia. Dianne K. Halleck and Delbert Wiens published an article setting forth an argument in favor of its status as a species. Their extensive field work showing distinctive chromosomal differences and reproductive isolation by ecological and seasonal differences was convincing.

Most authorities, including World Flora Online (WFO), Plants of the World Online (POWO), Flora of North America,, and the USDA Natural Resources Conservation Service PLANTS database (PLANTS) recognize it at the species level. Though occasionally botanical publications continue to use Claytonia lanceolata var. rosea as the Vascular Plants of Arizona Editorial Committee did in Canotia in 2006.

Claytonia rosea is diploid on a chromosome base number of x =8, 2n = 16.

=== Name ===
The scientific name of the species, rosea, means pink, a reference to the color of the flowers.

== Habitat and distribution ==
Claytonia rosea is the earliest flower of spring in the foothills and montane forests. It It grows in small meadows, open hillsides, canyons, ravines, and mesas of montane ponderosa pine, Chihuahuan pine, and oak belts. In New Mexico they are reported to be found more often on north facing slopes or in shaded canyons. They are recorded growing from 800–2,400 meters (2,600–7,900 ft) in elevation.

The exact range of Claytonia rosea is uncertain with different authorities recording different areas. POWO records it in the four corner states of Colorado, Utah, New Mexico, and Arizona and the Mexican state of Coahuila. PLANTS additionally records it as growing in Wyoming and Montana.

NatureServe has assessed the global status of Claytonia rosea as G4 - apparently secure, an uncommon but not rare species.

== Ecology ==
The first scientific observation of the Lasioglossum bee species L. perpunctatum was on flowers of Claytonia rosea near Boulder, Colorado by T.D.A. Cockerell and Marion Durbin Ellis.

== Cultivation ==
Rocky mountain spring beauty is occasionally grown in rock gardens or by those interested in wildflower gardening. Replanted corms will persist for a time even in less than ideal conditions, but will decline without reproducing if planted in areas subjected to either extreme drying during the summer or being flooded during rainstorms. Gardeners increase the numbers of this plant by seed rather than by division. Rich, well drained soil is their preferred condition in a garden setting. Plants are tolerant of being moved when blooming. Plants will freely reseed to produce additional individuals.

The roots, though small and not usually abundant, are edible. The wild foods author Harold D. Harrington found them to be crisp and starchy without much flavor when raw, but rather like earthy potatoes when boiled.
