= Eskimo potato =

Eskimo potato may refer to one of two plants with tuberous roots, that grow in the northern areas of Canada and Alaska:

- Claytonia tuberosa, family Montiaceae
- Hedysarum alpinum, family Fabaceae
