= C. palustris =

C. palustris may refer to:

- Calamus palustris, a rattan palm species in the genus Calamus
- Caltha palustris, the kingcup or marsh marigold, a plant species native to temperate regions of the Northern Hemisphere
- Cistothorus palustris, the marsh wren, a small songbird species found in North America
- Claytonia palustris, a wildflower species in the purslane family known by the common names Jonesville springbeauty and marsh claytonia
- Coespeletia palustris, a wildflower native to the Andes
- Crocodylus palustris, the mugger crocodile, Indian, Indus, Persian or marsh crocodile, a reptile species found throughout the Indian subcontinent and the surrounding countries
