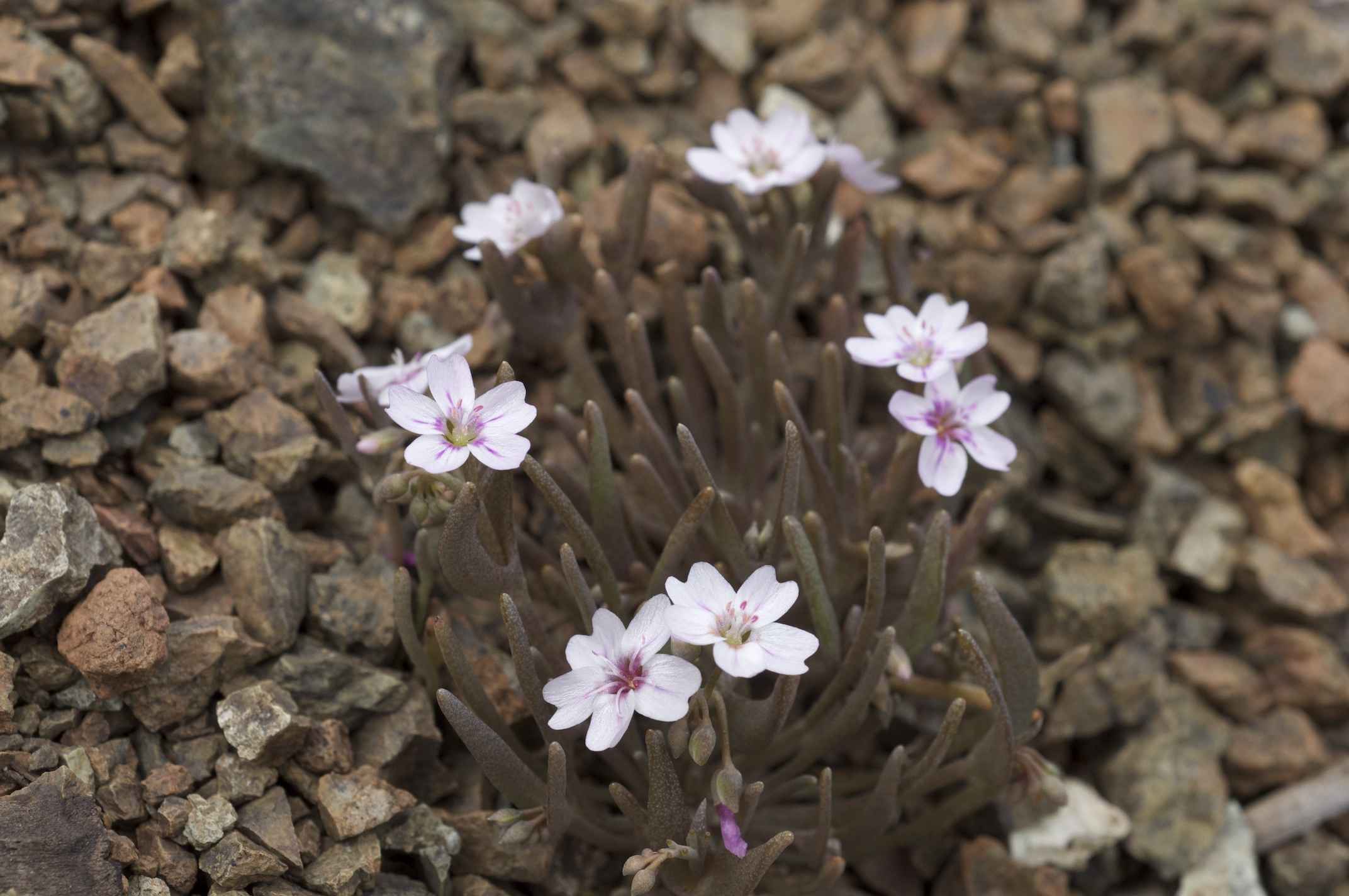

Conservation status
- Vulnerable (NatureServe)

Scientific classification
- Kingdom: Plantae
- Clade: Embryophytes
- Clade: Tracheophytes
- Clade: Angiosperms
- Clade: Eudicots
- Order: Caryophyllales
- Family: Montiaceae
- Genus: Claytonia
- Species: C. gypsophiloides

Binomial name
- Claytonia gypsophiloides Fisch. & C.A.Mey.

= Claytonia gypsophiloides =

Species of flowering plant

Claytonia gypsophiloides, known by the common names gypsum springbeauty and Coast Range claytonia, is a species of wildflower in the family Montiaceae.

== Distribution ==
The annual wildflower is endemic to California, where it grows in the California Coast Ranges from the North Coast Ranges south to the Temblor Range and Figueroa Mountain.

It can usually be found in moist areas with rocky soils, often serpentine, in California chaparral and woodlands habitats.

== Description ==
Claytonia gypsophiloides is an annual herb producing an erect stem 15 to 25 centimeters in maximum height.

The fleshy basal leaves are linear in shape and up to 15 centimeters long. The pair leaves at midpoint on the stem vary in shape. They may be linear and separate, fused along one side, or completely fused into a disc surrounding the stem. The leaves are gray-green, beige, or pinkish in color.

The stalked inflorescence is up to 15 centimeters long and bears up to 30 flowers. Each has 5 pink and white petals which are oval-shaped with a notched tip. The bloom period is February to April.
