= Claytonia ogilviensis =

Ogilvie Mountains spring beauty

Scientific classification
- Kingdom: Plantae
- Clade: Tracheophytes
- Clade: Angiosperms
- Clade: Eudicots
- Order: Caryophyllales
- Family: Montiaceae
- Genus: Claytonia
- Species: C. ogilviensis

Binomial name
- Claytonia ogilviensis McNeill

Species of flowering plant

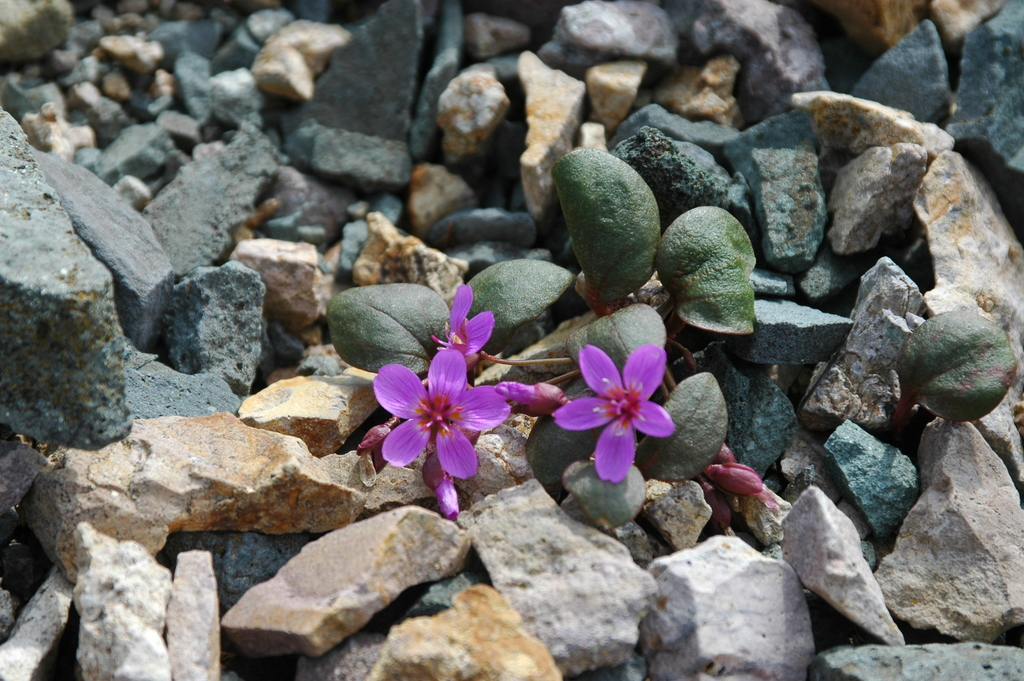
Ogilvie Mountains Spring Beauty, Claytonia ogilviensis, Mount Langham, Yukon. 19 July 2012.

Claytonia ogilviensis, common name Ogilvie Mountains spring beauty, is a plant endemic to the Ogilvie Mountains and the Dawson Range in the Yukon Territory of Canada. These mountains extend into Alaska, and one of the known populations is less than 1 km from the border, so it would not be surprising if the plant were to be found in Alaska as well.

Claytonia ogilviensis is a perennial herb with round or turnip-shaped tubers up to 25 mm in diameter, spreading by means of underground rhizomes. Stems are up to 8 cm tall. Leaves are generally round, up to 2.5 cm in diameter. Flowers are borne in umbels with leaf-like bracts. Flowers are bright purple, up to 20 mm in diameter.
