= Claytonia umbellata =

Scientific classification
- Kingdom: Plantae
- Clade: Tracheophytes
- Clade: Angiosperms
- Clade: Eudicots
- Order: Caryophyllales
- Family: Montiaceae
- Genus: Claytonia
- Species: C. umbellata

Binomial name
- Claytonia umbellata S.Watson

Species of flowering plant

Claytonia umbellata is a species of wildflower in the purslane family known by the common name Great Basin springbeauty. It is native to the Great Basin of the United States, where it grows mainly in subalpine coniferous forests, often on north-facing exposed slopes in the talus. It is a perennial herb growing from a tuberous root up to 5 centimeters wide and a thin taproot. Most of the stem develops underground, as do the petioles of the most basal leaves. Above the ground appear a few oval-shaped fleshy red to green leaves and an inflorescence of up to 12 flowers. Each flower has five magenta to deeply pink-tinted white petals.
