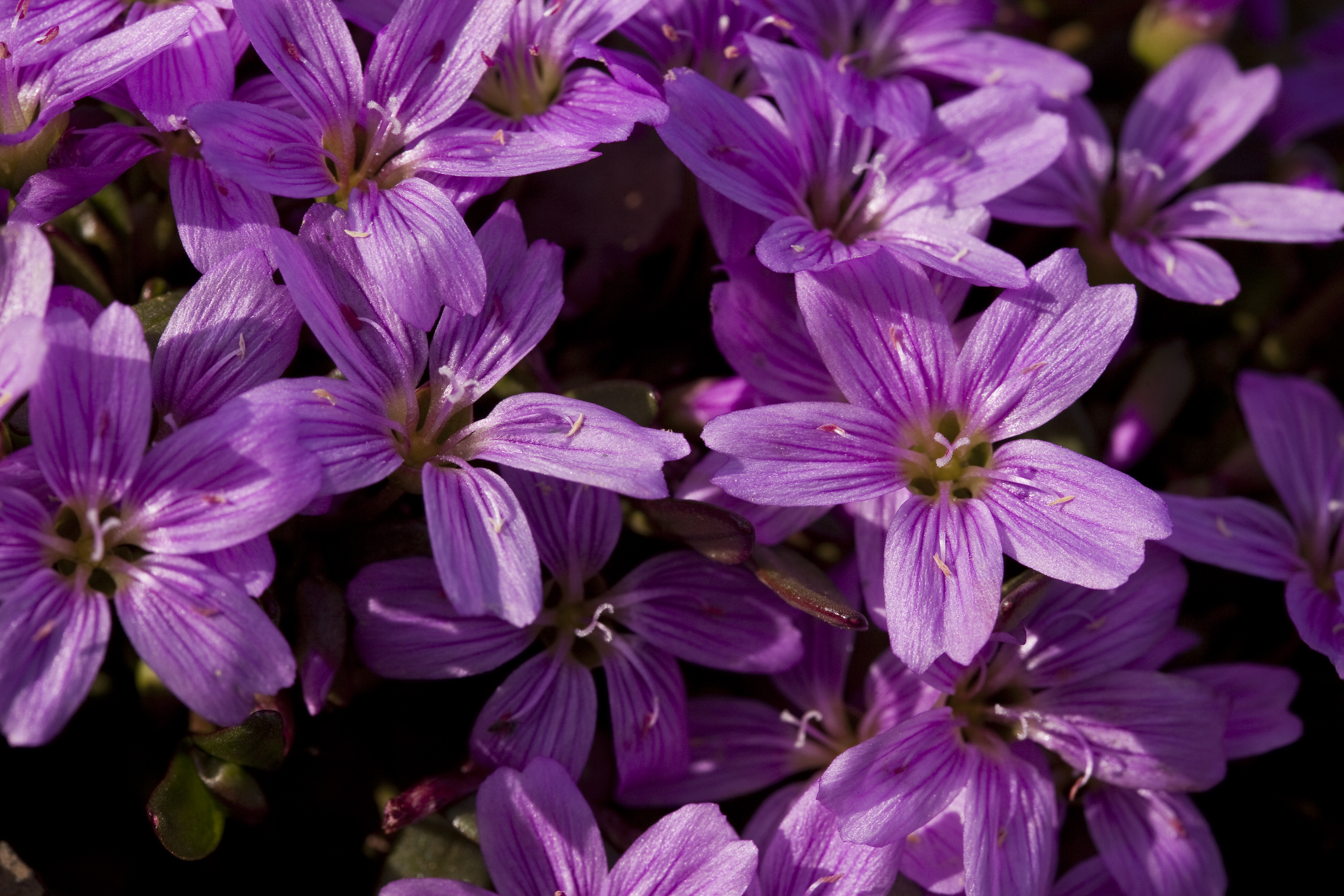
- Flowers

Scientific classification
- Kingdom: Plantae
- Clade: Tracheophytes
- Clade: Angiosperms
- Clade: Eudicots
- Order: Caryophyllales
- Family: Montiaceae
- Genus: Claytonia
- Species: C. scammaniana

Binomial name
- Claytonia scammaniana Hultén

Synonyms
- List: Claytonia koliana Gombócz; Claytonia porsildii Jurtzev; Montia scammaniana (Hultén) S.L.Welsh

= Claytonia scammaniana =

Species of flowering plant

Claytonia scammaniana is a biogeographically significant species of Claytonia, which is indigenous to the mountain chains of Alaska and Yukon. The species has been subject of differing taxonomic opinions and confusion with Claytonia arctica and C. sarmentosa. A taxonomic revision including a review of previous studies of Claytonia scammaniana was published in 2006. It was first collected in 1939 by Edith Scamman, its namesake.
