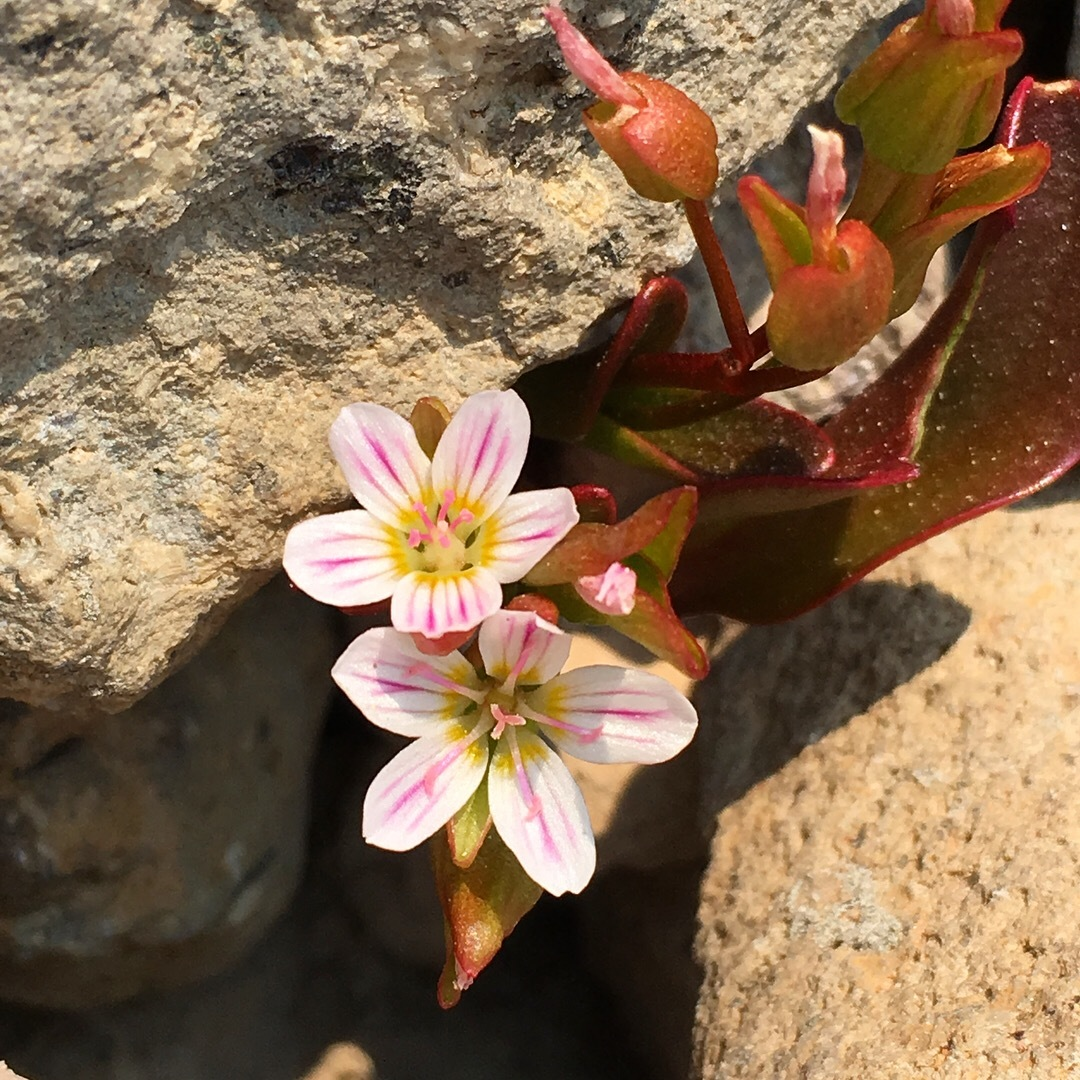

Scientific classification
- Kingdom: Plantae
- Clade: Tracheophytes
- Clade: Angiosperms
- Clade: Eudicots
- Order: Caryophyllales
- Family: Montiaceae
- Genus: Claytonia
- Species: C. nevadensis

Binomial name
- Claytonia nevadensis S.Watson

= Claytonia nevadensis =

Species of flowering plant

Claytonia nevadensis, known by the common names Sierra springbeauty and Sierra Nevada claytonia, is a species of wildflower in the family Montiaceae. The evolutionary relationship of Claytonia nevadensis to other claytonias is a subject of debate and ongoing genetic studies. Sierra springbeauties are diploid with a chromosome base number of x = 7

== Distribution ==
The wildflower is endemic to northern California and south-central Oregon.

It is native to the Sierra Nevada as far south as Farewell Gap; and is indigenous to the Sweetwater Range, Trinity Mountains, Inner Klamath Range, southern Cascade Range, and northeast to the Warner Mountains and Steens Mountain of the Harney Basin Region of Oregon. It grows in subalpine habitats such as scree and gravelly snowmelt stream banks.

== Description ==
Claytonia nevadensis is a perennial herb growing from a network of fleshy rhizomes with a small horizontal caudex at ground level. It takes the form of a leafy clump with a stem no longer than about 10 centimeters (4 inches).

The thick red-green leaves are oval to spade-shaped and a few centimeters long, not counting the longer petiole of the most basal leaves.

The inflorescence is a dense cluster of 2 to 8 flowers which nests in the clump of leaves or arises on a very short stalk. Each flower has five magenta to pink-tinted white petals up to a centimeter long. The bloom period is July to September.
