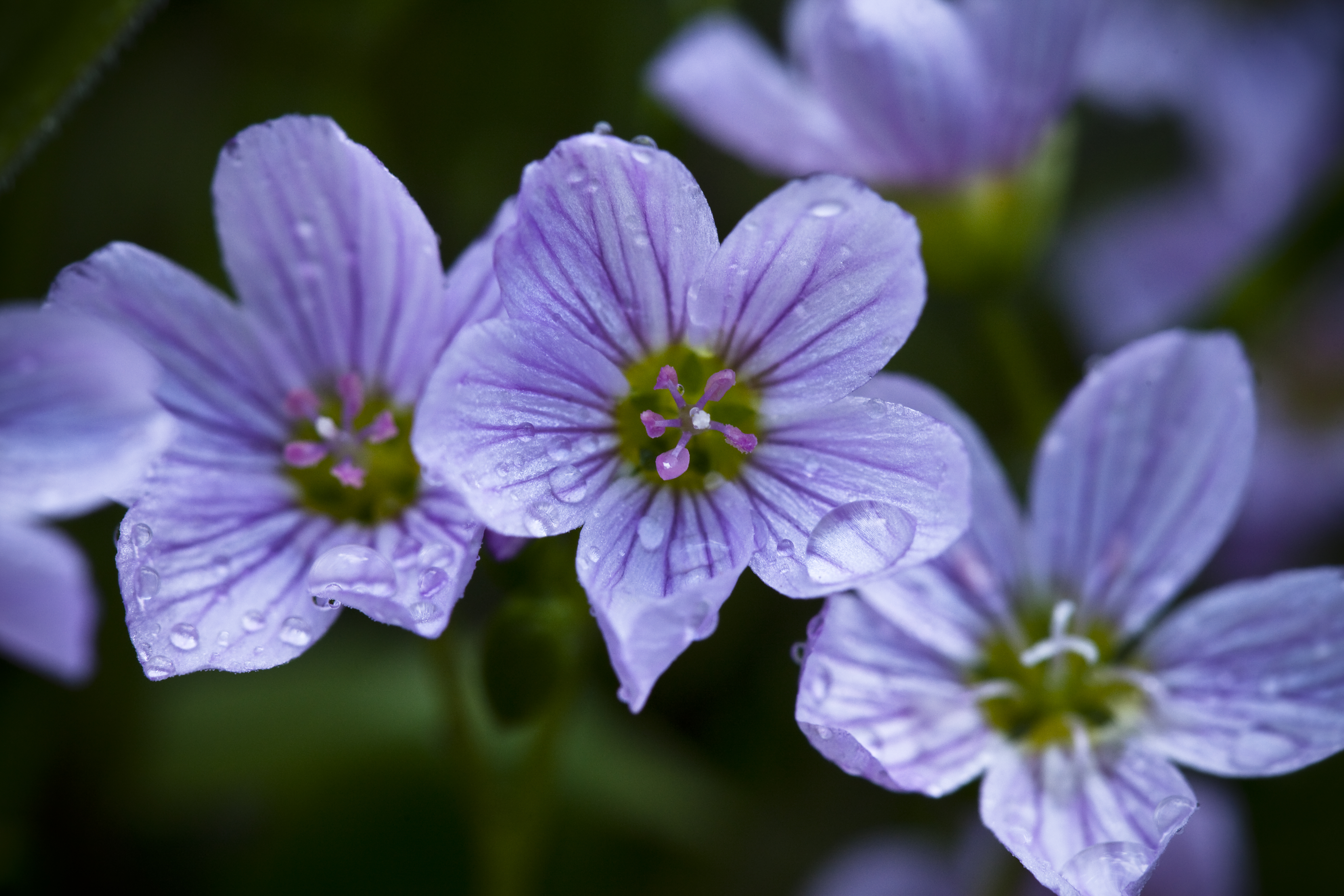
- Flowers

Scientific classification
- Kingdom: Plantae
- Clade: Embryophytes
- Clade: Tracheophytes
- Clade: Angiosperms
- Clade: Eudicots
- Order: Caryophyllales
- Family: Montiaceae
- Genus: Claytonia
- Species: C. sarmentosa

Binomial name
- Claytonia sarmentosa C.A.Mey.

Synonyms
- List: Limnia sarmentosa (C.A.Mey.) Rydb.; Montia sarmentosa (C.A.Mey.) B.L.Rob.

= Claytonia sarmentosa =

Species of flowering plant

Claytonia sarmentosa is a species of flowering plant in the genus Claytonia, which is indigenous to the mountains of the Lake Baikal region and eastern Siberia and northwestern North America including Alaska, Yukon and northern British Columbia. A widespread species of the mountain chains of Asia and North America, Claytonia sarmentosa has been subject of differing taxonomic opinions with problematic confusion with Claytonia arctica and C. scammaniana. A taxonomic revision including an analysis of the Udokan Mountains population and comparison with Alaskan material was published in 2006.
