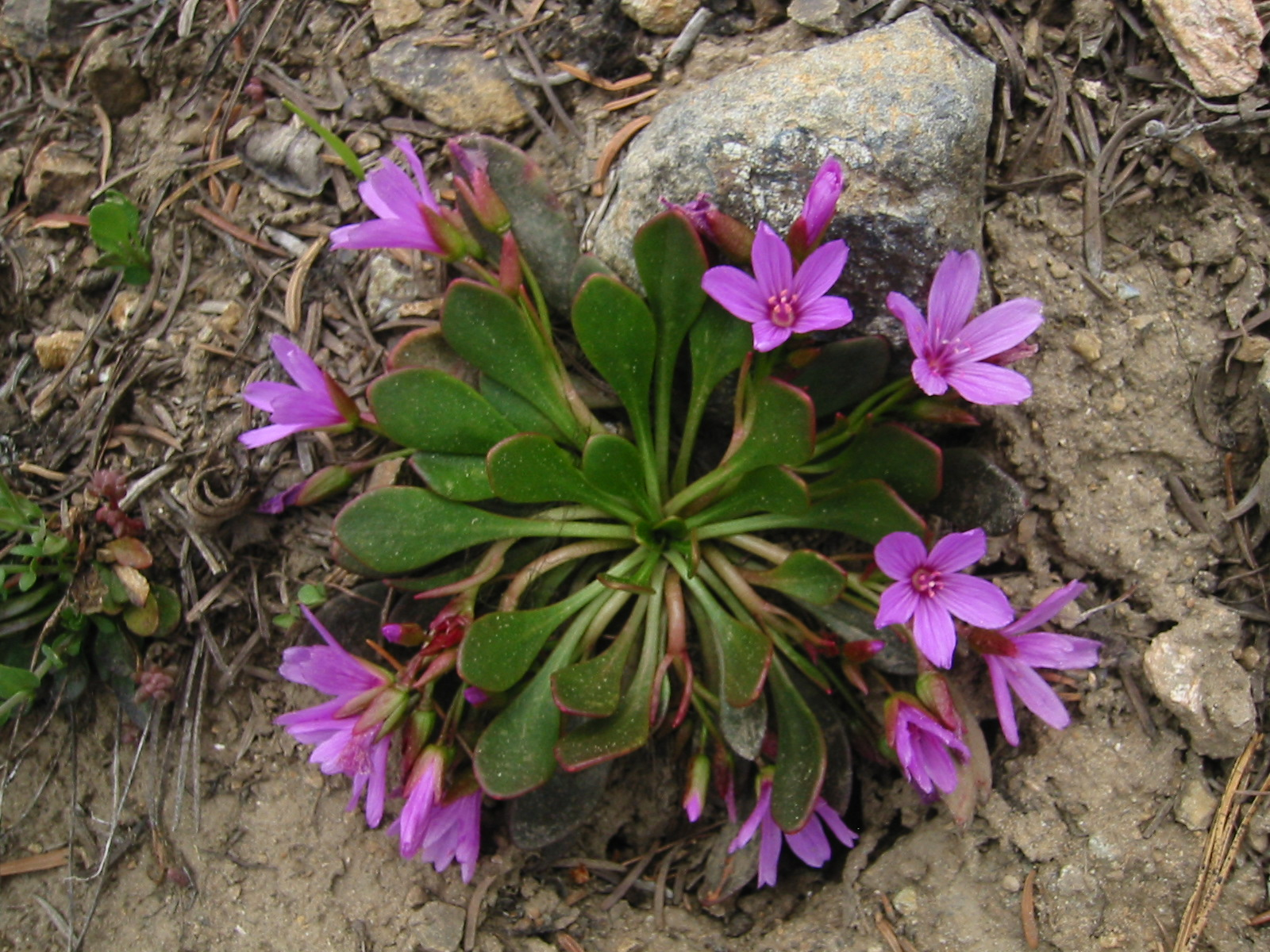
- In the Wenatchee Mountains

Conservation status
- Secure (NatureServe)

Scientific classification
- Kingdom: Plantae
- Clade: Tracheophytes
- Clade: Angiosperms
- Clade: Eudicots
- Order: Caryophyllales
- Family: Montiaceae
- Genus: Claytonia
- Species: C. megarhiza

Binomial name
- Claytonia megarhiza (A.Gray) Parry ex S.Watson

Synonyms
- List: Claytonia arctica var. megarhiza A.Gray; Claytonia bellidifolia Rydb.; Claytonia megarhiza var. bellidifolia (Rydb.) C.L.Hitchc.; Claytonia megarhiza var. nivalis (English) C.L.Hitchc.; Claytonia nivalis English

= Claytonia megarhiza =

Plant species in the springbeauty family

Claytonia megarhiza is a species of wildflower in the family Montiaceae known by the common names fell-fields claytonia and alpine springbeauty. The specific epithet megarhiza is Greek for "large roots".

== Range and habitat ==
Claytonia megarhiza is native to western North America from northwestern Canada to New Mexico, where it grows in rock crevices and talus habitats in subalpine and alpine climates. The species is known from summits and slopes of North America's highest mountains including the Redstone Mountains of the Canadian Northwest Territories, disjunct south to the central and southern Rocky Mountains reaching a southern limit in the Sangre de Cristo Mountains. In the Wenatchee Mountains of Washington State it is often found on serpentine.

== Description ==
This is a perennial herb growing from a thick, scaly caudex topped with a stem 5–25 cm (2–10 in) in length. The fleshy basal leaves form a dense rosette around the caudex. The leaves are often red when young and turn green as they mature, often retaining a dark purple-red edge. The inflorescences arise from within the rosette of leaves, usually around the rosette edges, and produce a dense cluster of two to six white or pinkish flowers. Each petals reaches 5–20 mm (0.2–0.8 in) in length. Claytonia megarhiza var. nivalis (Wenatchee springbeauty) grows on serpentine soils and has bright violet flowers.

== Uses ==
The rosettes of the leaves and the roots can be eaten as an emergency food.
