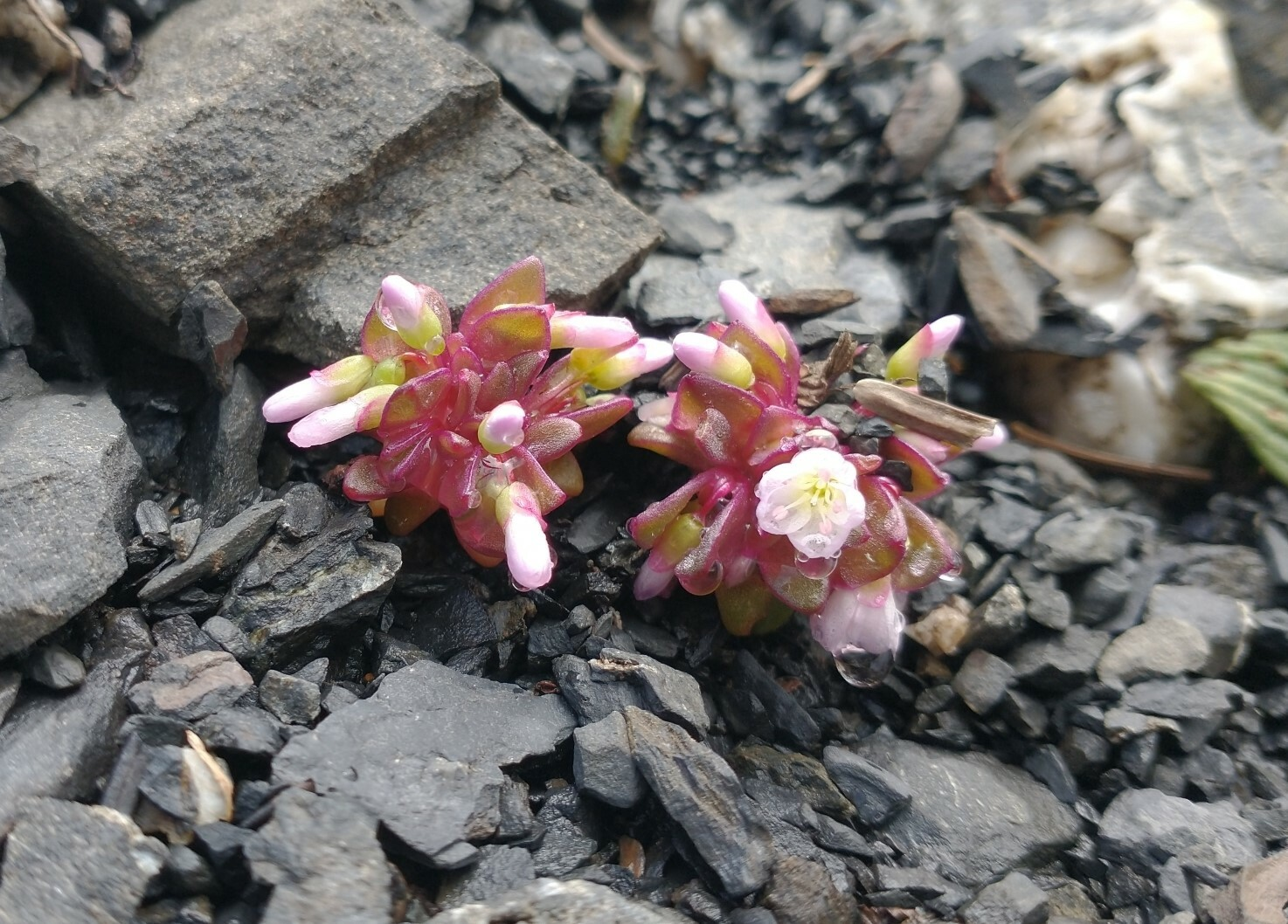

Conservation status
- Imperiled (NatureServe)

Scientific classification
- Kingdom: Plantae
- Clade: Tracheophytes
- Clade: Angiosperms
- Clade: Eudicots
- Order: Caryophyllales
- Family: Montiaceae
- Genus: Claytonia
- Species: C. saxosa

Binomial name
- Claytonia saxosa Brandegee

= Claytonia saxosa =

Species of flowering plant

Claytonia saxosa, known by the common name Brandegee's springbeauty, is a species of wildflower in the family Montiaceae.

== Distribution ==
The wildflower is endemic to northern California and southern Oregon. In northern California it is located on serpentine soils. In Oregon it is located in three places on basalt soils in the Cascade-Siskiyou National Monument in southern Oregon. It is found on rocky open slopes at mid to high elevations.

== Description ==
Claytonia saxosa is a small, compact annual herb forming clumps a few centimeters wide in rock crevices. Serpentinite is the favored geologic substrate of this species. The leaves are small, with fleshy spatulate blades. The basal leaves and flowering stems are pink or red in color, packed densely together about the short stem that surmounts a minute, tuberous caudex. The chromosome number of the species is 2n = 16.

Two to ten flowers emerge from the clump, each with five light pink petals under a centimeter long. The bloom period is March to May.
