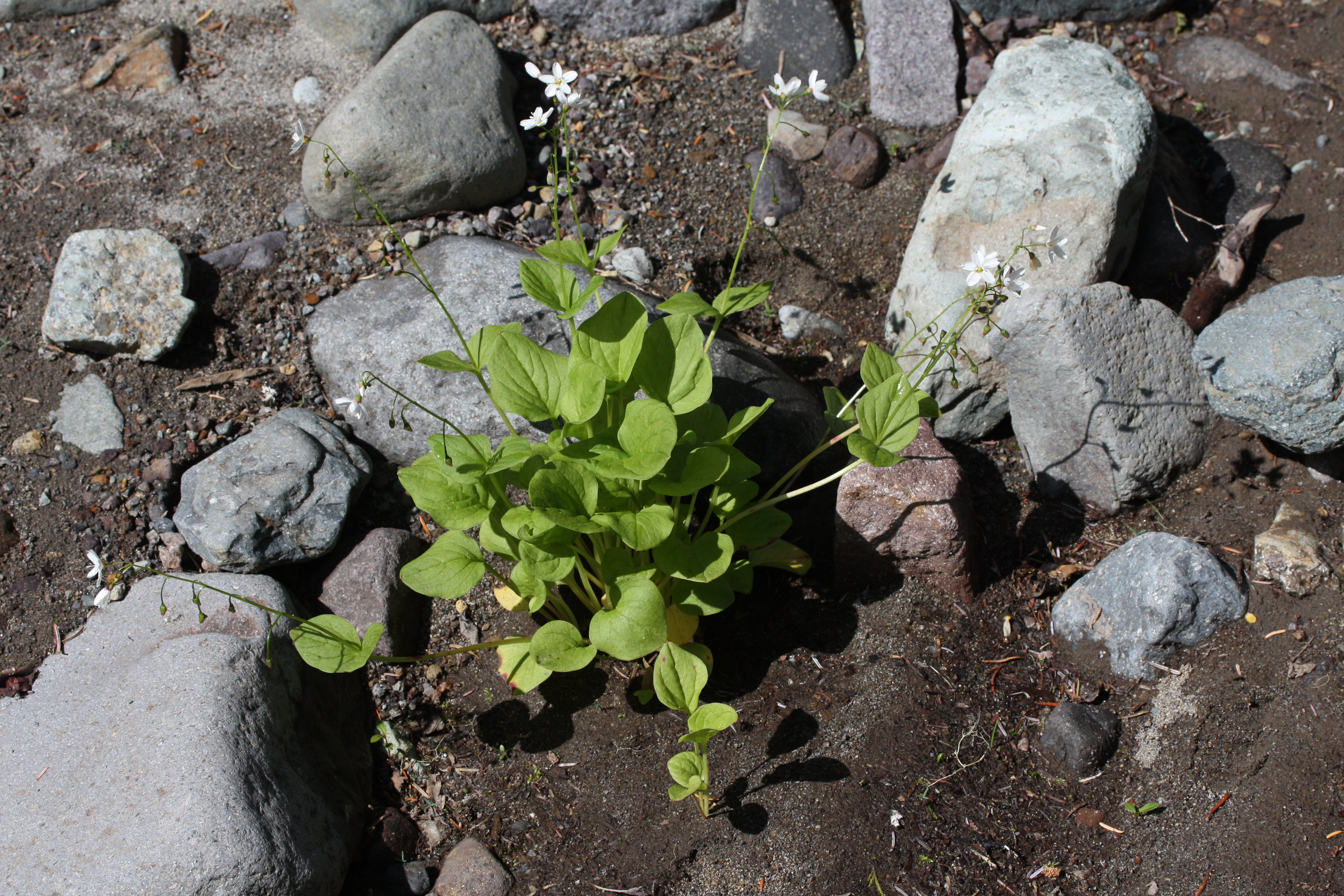

Scientific classification
- Kingdom: Plantae
- Clade: Tracheophytes
- Clade: Angiosperms
- Clade: Eudicots
- Order: Caryophyllales
- Family: Montiaceae
- Genus: Claytonia
- Species: C. cordifolia

Binomial name
- Claytonia cordifolia S.Wats.

= Claytonia cordifolia =

Species of flowering plant

Claytonia cordifolia is a species of wildflower in the family Montiaceae known by the common name heartleaf springbeauty. It is native to western North America from British Columbia to Utah, where it grows in shallow lakes and in streams or springs and wetlands including bogs and fens according to Miller and Chambers (2006). It is a perennial herb growing from a long, budding rhizome and producing an erect stem up to 40 centimeters tall. The basal leaves have oval blades up to 9 centimeters long with heart-shaped bases where they attach to their long petioles. There is also a pair of oval-shaped leaves at a midpoint on the stem. The stalked inflorescence bears up to 12 small flowers with five white petals each about a centimeter long.
