= Claytonia arctica =

Scientific classification
- Kingdom: Plantae
- Clade: Embryophytes
- Clade: Tracheophytes
- Clade: Angiosperms
- Clade: Eudicots
- Order: Caryophyllales
- Family: Montiaceae
- Genus: Claytonia
- Species: C. arctica

Binomial name
- Claytonia arctica Adams

Synonyms
- Claytonia acutifolia Ledeb.

Species of flowering plant

Claytonia arctica, the Arctic spring beauty, is a species of flowering plant native to Siberia including the Taimyr Peninsula and Wrangel Island and eastward to the Aleutians and Bering Sea islands of Alaska. A plant species of the circumpolar Arctic, it has been confused with Claytonia sarmentosa and C. scammaniana. A taxonomic revision including a lectotypification of Claytonia arctica was published in 2006.
