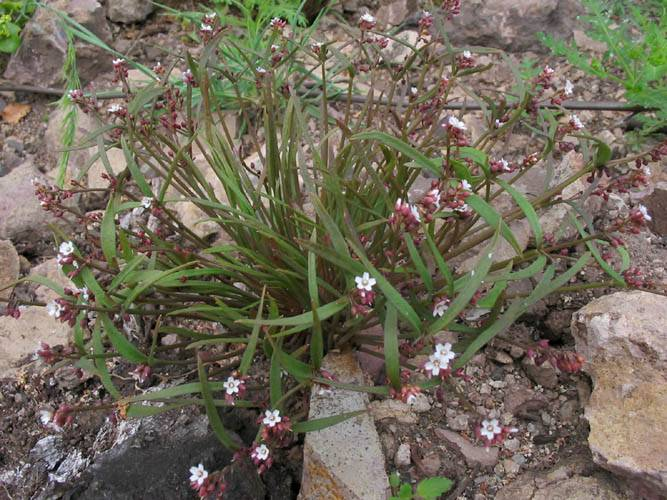

Scientific classification
- Kingdom: Plantae
- Clade: Tracheophytes
- Clade: Angiosperms
- Clade: Eudicots
- Order: Caryophyllales
- Family: Montiaceae
- Genus: Claytonia
- Species: C. exigua

Binomial name
- Claytonia exigua Torr. & A.Gray

= Claytonia exigua =

Species of flowering plant

Claytonia exigua is a species of wildflower known by the common names serpentine springbeauty and pale claytonia, in the family Montiaceae.

It is native to western North America from British Columbia to Idaho to California, where it grows in a number of habitat types, including plant communities on serpentine soils.

== Description ==
Claytonia exigua is a fleshy annual herb producing a patch of upright or leaning stems up to about 15 centimeters tall.

The thick leaves are linear in shape and fingerlike near the base of the plant and crescent to disc-shaped higher up the stem. The plant is hairless and waxy and varies in color from green to pinkish, grayish, or brownish.

The inflorescence holds several flowers on drooping pedicels which turn erect as the plant develops fruit. The flower has five lobed petals each a few millimeters long and in shades of pink, white, or pink-streaked white.

The fruit is a capsule less than three millimeters long containing a few tiny seeds.
