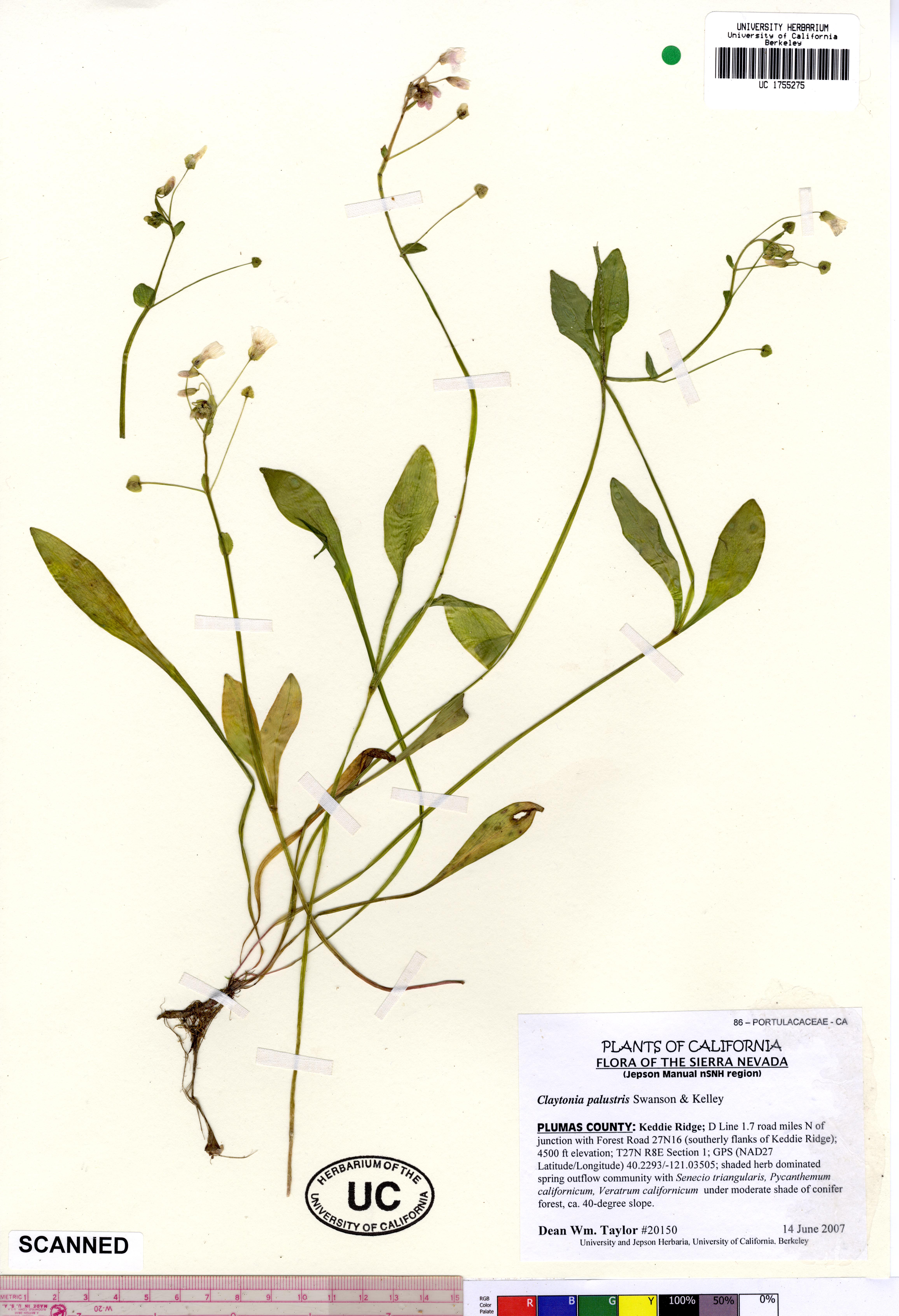

Scientific classification
- Kingdom: Plantae
- Clade: Tracheophytes
- Clade: Angiosperms
- Clade: Eudicots
- Order: Caryophyllales
- Family: Montiaceae
- Genus: Claytonia
- Species: C. palustris

Binomial name
- Claytonia palustris Swanson & Kelley

= Claytonia palustris =

Species of flowering plant

Claytonia palustris is a species of wildflower in the family Montiaceae known by the common names Jonesville springbeauty and marsh claytonia. Often mistaken for Claytonia sibirica, the species is diploid (2n = 12) with a chromosome base number of x = 6.

== Distribution ==
The wildflower is endemic to California where it is a rare species indigenous to wetlands including bogs, fens, meadows and streamside riparian thickets at low- to mid-elevations of the Klamath Mountains, Cascade Range, and Sierra Nevada as far south as the Kern and Tule River watersheds. The species epithet palustris is Latin for "of the marsh" and indicates its common habitat.

== Description ==
Claytonia palustris is a rhizomatous perennial herb producing a slender stem up to about 0.5 metres (1.6 ft) long. It has leaves with oval-shaped blades a few centimeters long at the ends of long, narrow petioles. The inflorescence bears up to 18 flowers on a long stalk. Each flower has 5 white or pink-tinted white petals just under a centimeter long. The bloom period is May to October.
