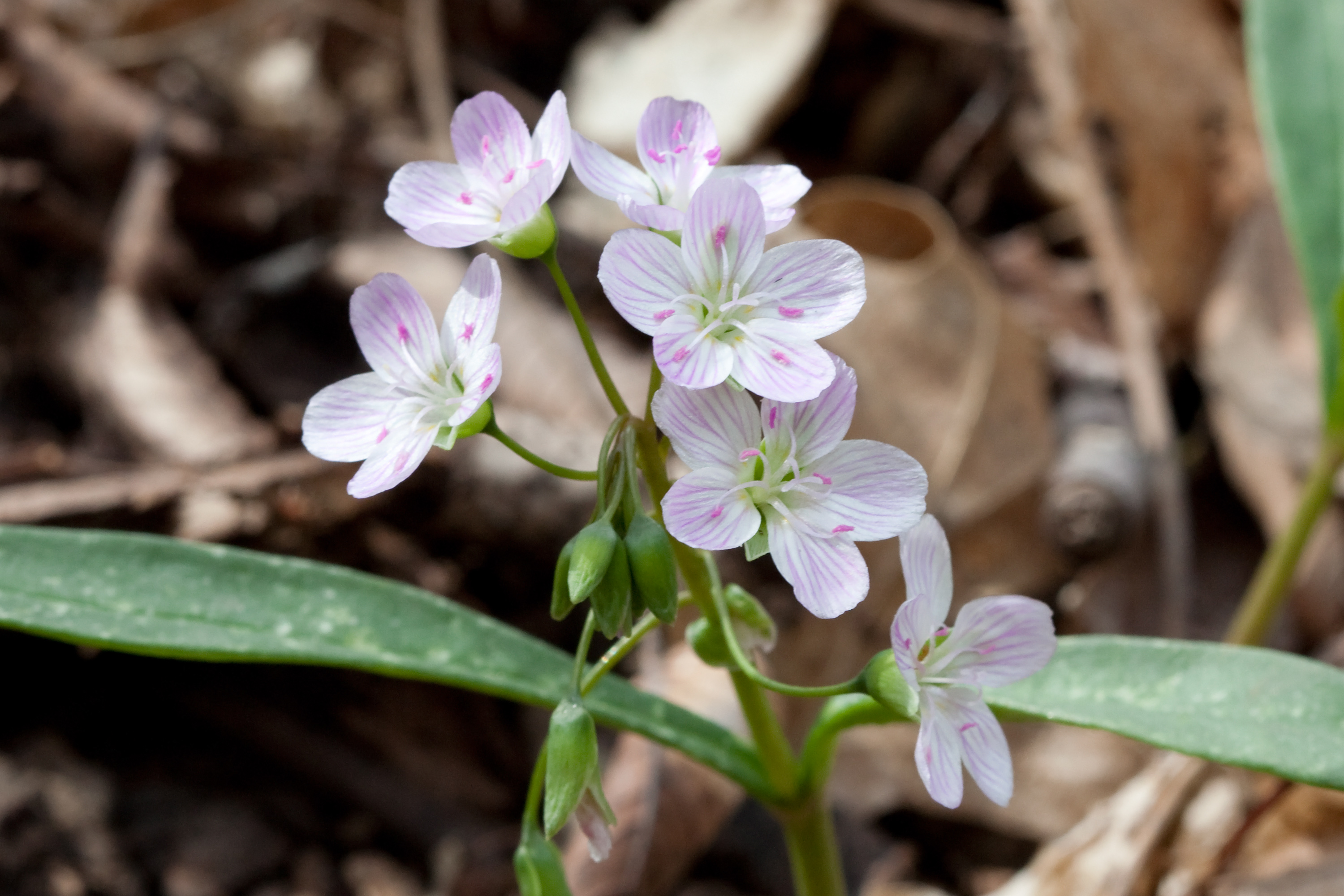
- Claytonia virginica

Scientific classification
- Kingdom: Plantae
- Clade: Tracheophytes
- Clade: Angiosperms
- Clade: Eudicots
- Order: Caryophyllales
- Family: Montiaceae
- Genus: Claytonia; L.

= Claytonia =

Genus of flowering plants

Claytonia (spring beauty) is a genus of flowering plants native to Asia, North America, and Central America. The vitamin-rich leaves can be eaten raw or cooked, and the tubers can be prepared like potatoes.

== Description ==
The plants are somewhat fleshy and only a few centimeters in height. The flower heads are about 2.5 cm (1 inch) in diameter.

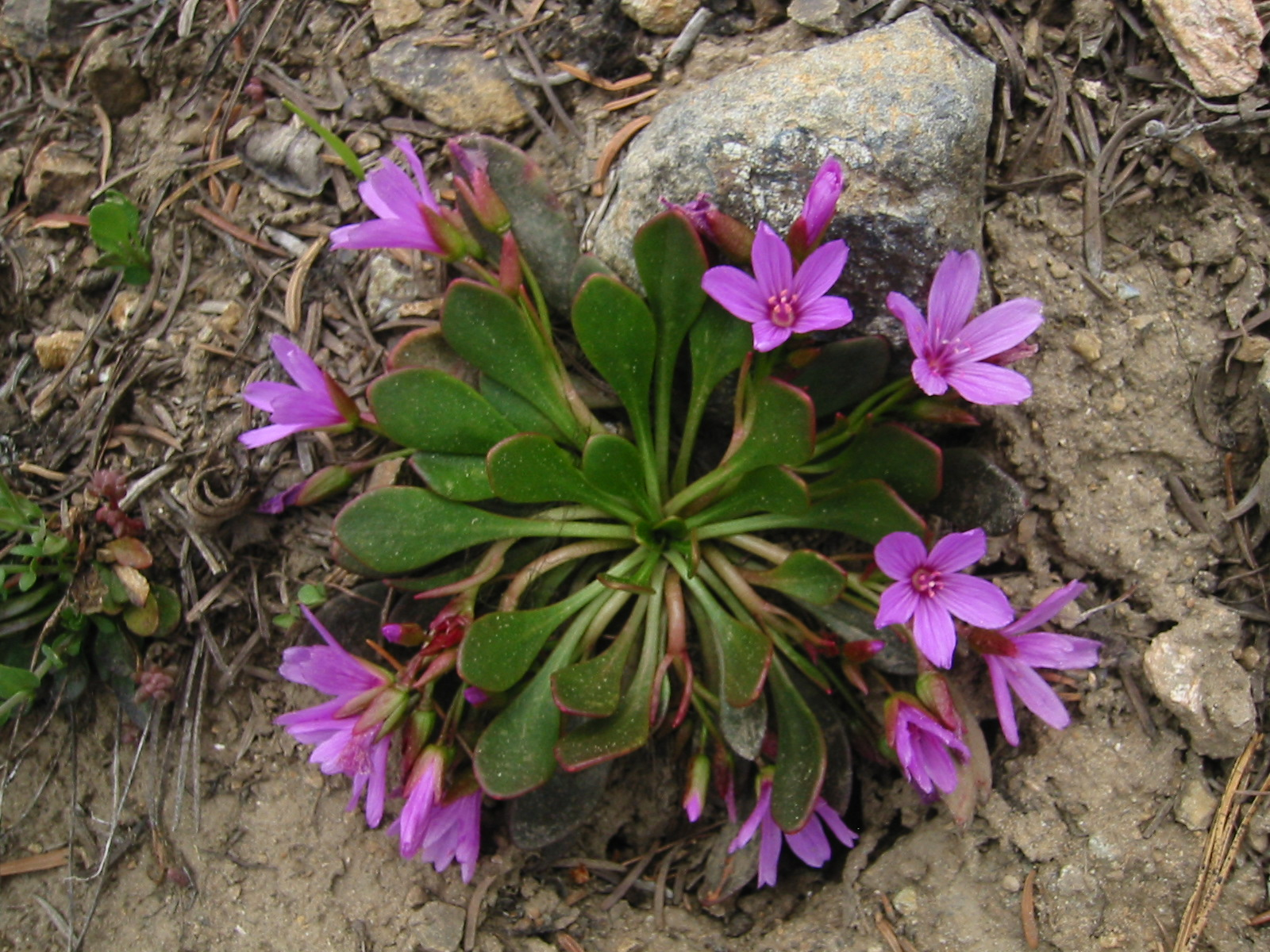
Claytonia megarhiza

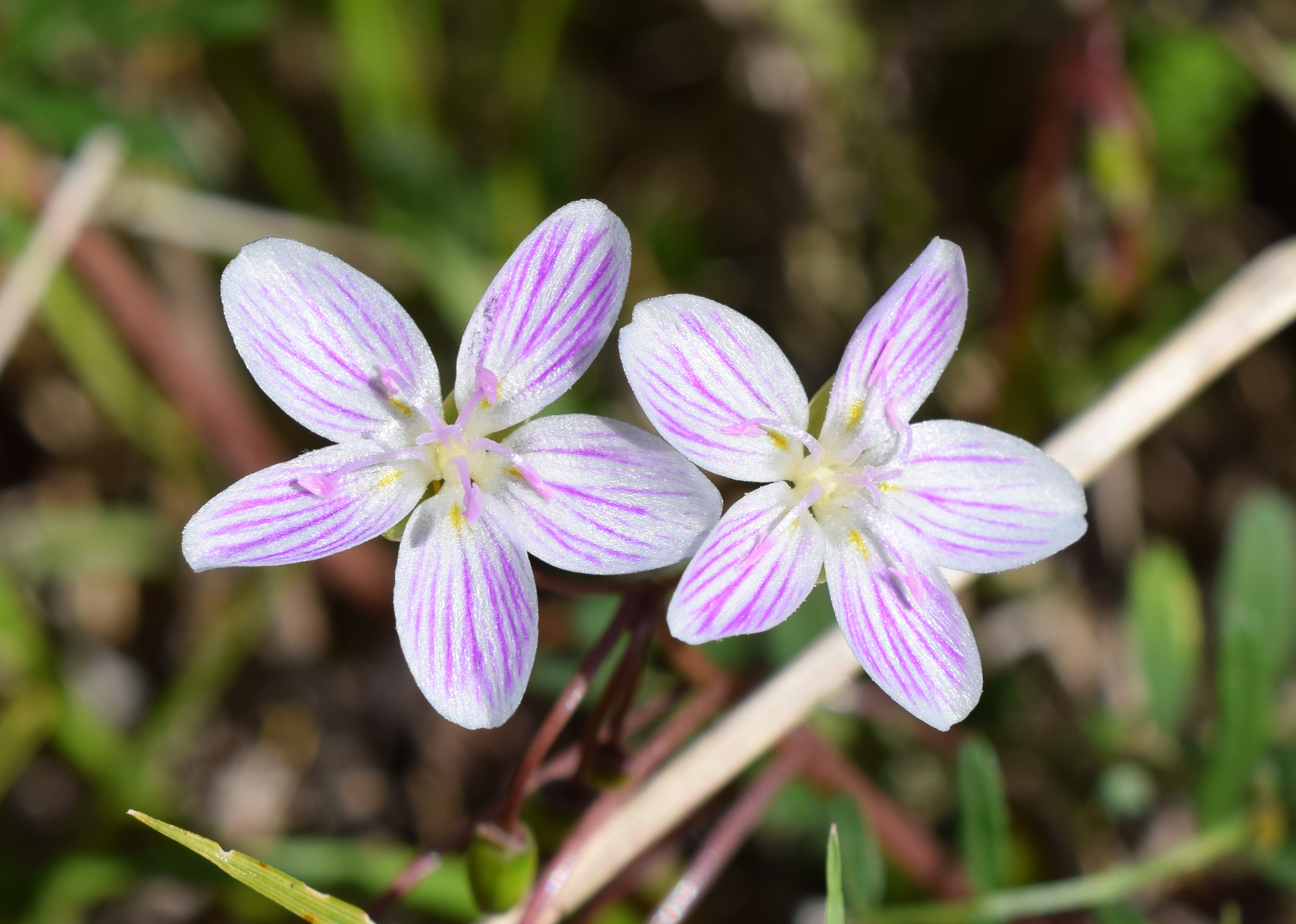
Flowers of Claytonia virginica

== Taxonomy ==
The genus was formerly included in the purslane family (Portulacaceae), but with the adoption of the APG IV system, in 2009 it was moved to the family Montiaceae. A number of the species were formerly treated in the related genus Montia. A comprehensive scientific study of Claytonia was published in 2006.

=== Species ===
As of January 2019, Kew's Plants of the World Online lists 33 accepted species:

- Claytonia acutifolia Pall. ex Willd.
- Claytonia arctica Adams
- Claytonia arenicola L.F.Hend.
- Claytonia arkansana Yatsk., R.Evans & Witsell
- Claytonia caroliniana Michx.
- Claytonia cordifolia S.Watson
- Claytonia crawfordii Stoughton
- Claytonia exigua Torr. & A.Gray
- Claytonia gypsophiloides Fisch. & C.A.Mey.
- Claytonia joanneana Schult.
- Claytonia lanceolata Pursh
- Claytonia megarhiza (A.Gray) Parry ex S.Watson
- Claytonia multiscapa Rydb.
- Claytonia nevadensis S.Watson
- Claytonia obovata Rydb.
- Claytonia ogilviensis McNeill
- Claytonia palustris Swanson & Kelley
- Claytonia panamintensis Stoughton
- Claytonia parviflora Douglas
- Claytonia peirsonii (Munz & I.M.Johnst.) Stoughton
- Claytonia perfoliata Donn ex Willd.
- Claytonia rosea Rydb.
- Claytonia rubra (Howell) Tidestr.
- Claytonia sarmentosa C.A.Mey.
- Claytonia saxosa Brandegee
- Claytonia scammaniana Hultén
- Claytonia serpenticola Stoughton
- Claytonia sibirica L.
- Claytonia tuberosa Pall. ex Schult.
- Claytonia udokanica Zuev
- Claytonia umbellata S.Watson
- Claytonia virginica L.
- Claytonia washingtoniana (Suksd.) Suksd.

=== Etymology ===
The genus is named after John Clayton, who collected specimens of various plants in North America and distributed them to botanists in Europe.

== Distribution and habitat ==
The genus is primarily native to the mountain chains of Asia and North America. In the Old World, it is distributed northwest to Kazakhstan, Mongolia, and eastern Russia. It is found in most of the northern United States, with some species located in Mexico and Guatemala.

Claytonia perfoliata, the species for which the term miner's lettuce was coined, is distributed throughout the Mountain West of North America in moist soils and prefers areas that have been recently disturbed.

== Uses ==
The leaves of the spring beauty are rich in vitamins and can be eaten raw or cooked. The roots are in the form of tubers which can be cooked and eaten like potatoes.
