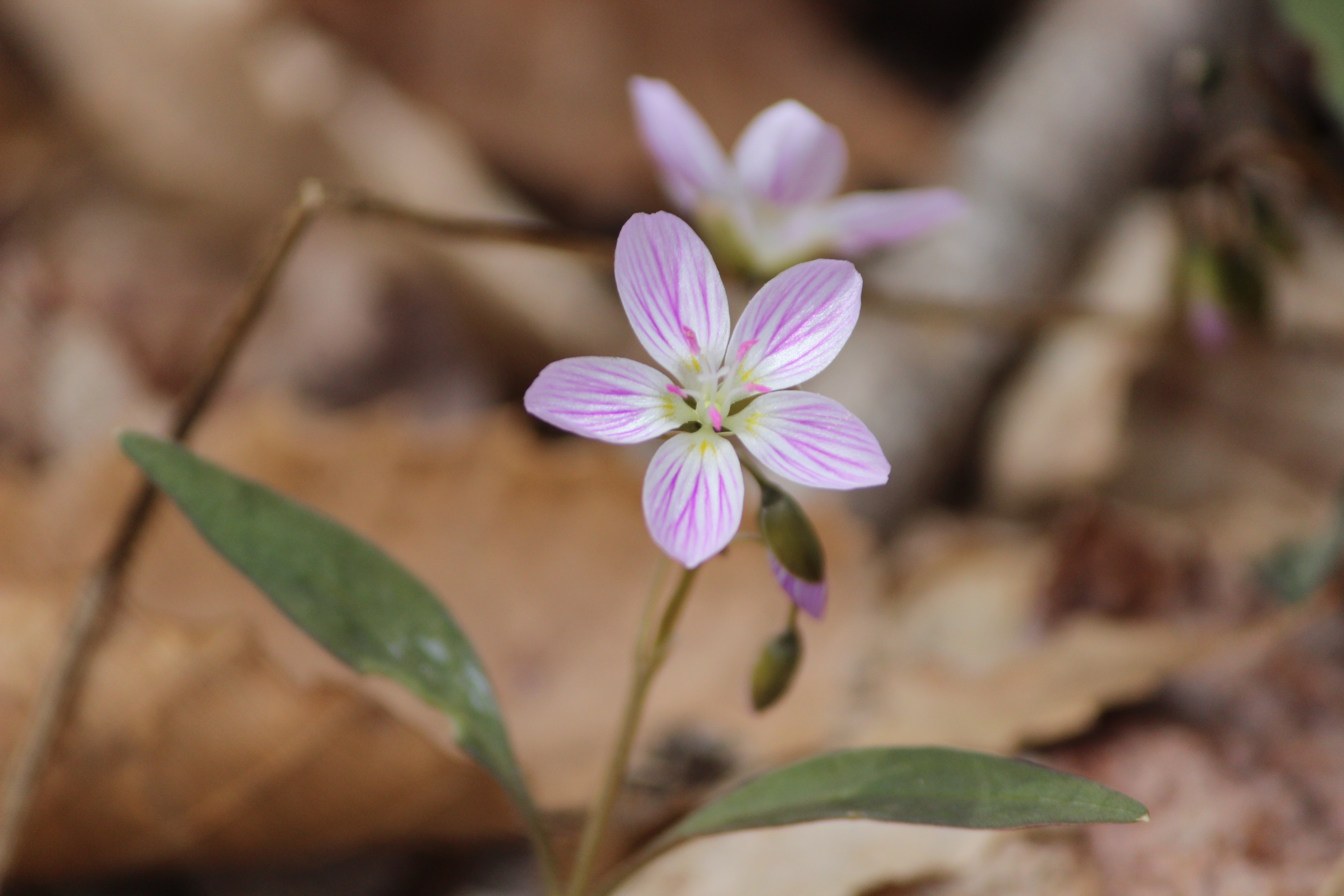

Scientific classification
- Kingdom: Plantae
- Clade: Tracheophytes
- Clade: Angiosperms
- Clade: Eudicots
- Order: Caryophyllales
- Family: Montiaceae
- Genus: Claytonia
- Species: C. caroliniana

Binomial name
- Claytonia caroliniana Michx. 1803

Synonyms
- Claytonia latifolia E.Sheld.; Claytonia spatulata Eaton; Claytonia spathulifolia Salisb.

= Claytonia caroliniana =

Species of flowering plant

Claytonia caroliniana, the Carolina springbeauty, is an herbaceous perennial in the family Montiaceae. It was formerly placed in the Portulacaceae. Its native range is eastern and central North America. It is most commonly found in the New England area of the United States but its habitat extends from Ontario and a northern limit in the Cape Anguille Mountains of Newfoundland and south to Alabama. It grows approximately 6 inches tall in forests of the Appalachian Mountains and piedmont

== Description ==
Claytonia caroliniana is a flowering, woodland perennial herb. It grows from March though June and is one of the earliest spring ephemerals. The plant grows from spherical underground tubers in light humus. They sprout and bloom before the tree canopy develops. Once the area is shaded, the plants wither leaving only the tuberous roots underground.

The flowers consist of five pink and purple petals. Dark pink veins accent the petals and give them a striped appearance. The carpels are fused together. They grow on a stem 3 - 10 inches tall that bears a single pair of broad leaves. This distinguishes it from Claytonia virginica, which, although similar in other ways, has longer and much narrower leaves. Claytonia caroliniana is similar to some of the Arctic claytonias, but is probably allied to Claytonia ozarkensis. Natural hybrids with Claytonia virginica have been documented

There are two green leaves that grow opposite each other on a node. The leaf has no teeth or lobes and a prominent central vein. They grow up to three inches long and 1/2 to 3/4 inches wide.

=== Uses ===
The plant is edible but its usability is limited due to difficulty harvesting and the small quantities each plant produces. Its tuberous roots are edible and rich in starch and can be cooked or eaten raw. The leaves can be eaten as well. The tuberous roots are eaten by eastern chipmunks and white-footed mice.

=== History ===
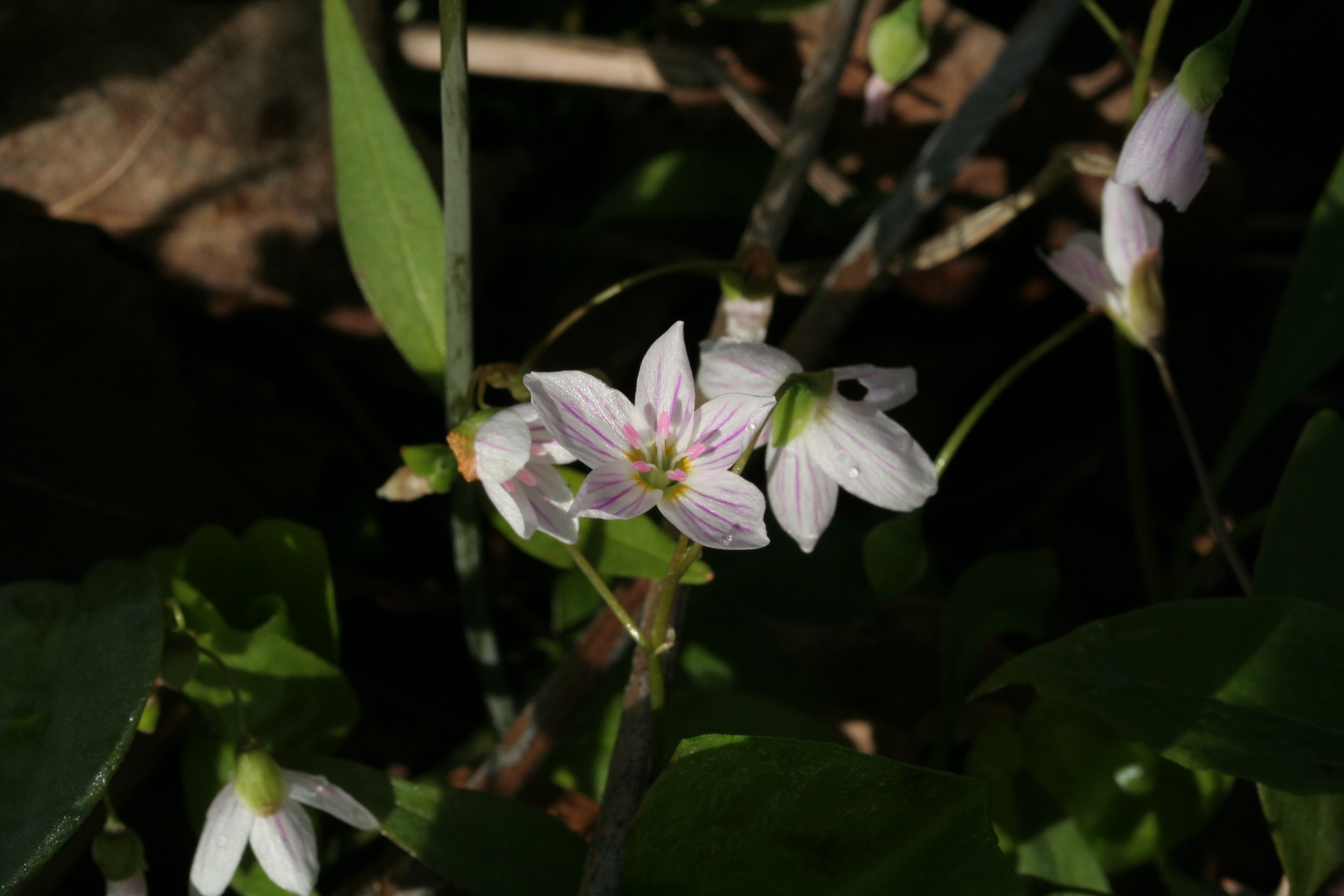
Deschambault-Grondines, Quebec, Canada

The plant was named after John Clayton. Clayton was an early collector of plant specimens in Virginia.
