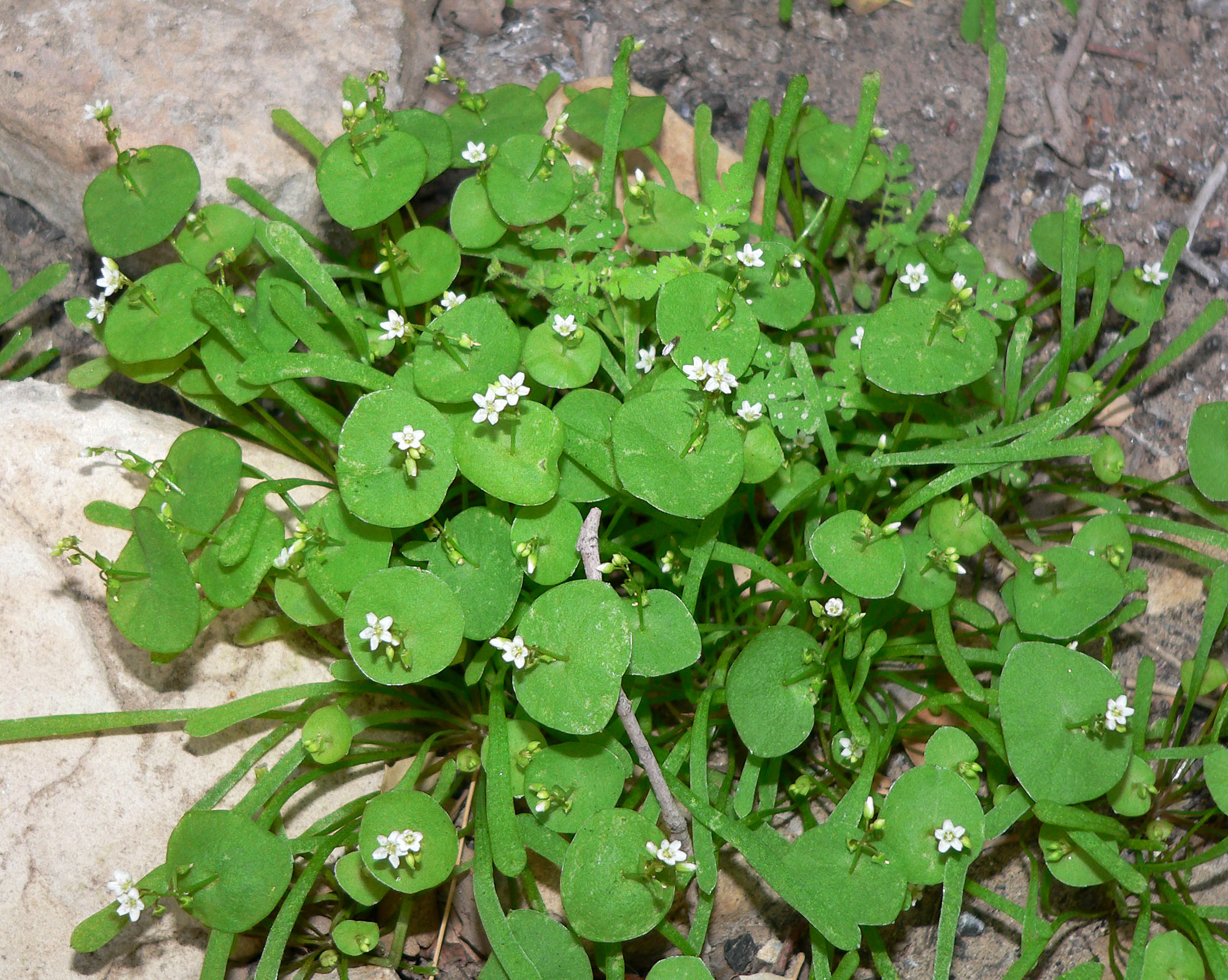
- subsp. utahensis in Icebox Canyon, southern Nevada

Scientific classification
- Kingdom: Plantae
- Clade: Tracheophytes
- Clade: Angiosperms
- Clade: Eudicots
- Order: Caryophyllales
- Family: Montiaceae
- Genus: Claytonia
- Species: C. parviflora

Binomial name
- Claytonia parviflora Dougl. ex Hook.

= Claytonia parviflora =

Species of flowering plant

Claytonia parviflora is a species of wildflower in the family Montiaceae known by the common name Streambank Springbeauty. It is native to western North America from southwestern Canada to northwestern Mexico, where it is found in many types of habitat, particularly areas that are moist in the spring.

== Description ==
C. parviflora is an annual herb growing in a clump or spreading to a maximum length of about 30 centimeters. The basal leaves are linear, often with an indistinct petiole. Some races may have lance-shaped blades on long, tapering petioles. There are also leaves on the flower stem which may be similar in shape or may be rounded or squared and sometimes fuse together to create a bowl around the stem. The herbage is green to pink in color. The inflorescence is a cluster of up to 40 small flowers, each with petals a few millimeters long and white to pink-tinted, or deep pink in color. The largest flowers, up to 1 cm in diameter, are found in Claytonia parviflora subsp. grandiflora, which is a subspecies endemic to the foothills and lower slopes of the western Sierra Nevada of North America. Together with Claytonia perfoliata and Claytonia rubra, Claytonia parviflora comprises what is almost certainly a polyploid pillar complex.

There are four well-defined subspecies of Claytonia parviflora: Claytonia parviflora subsp. grandiflora, Claytonia parviflora subsp. parviflora, Claytonia parviflora subsp. utahensis, and Claytonia parviflora subsp. viridis.
