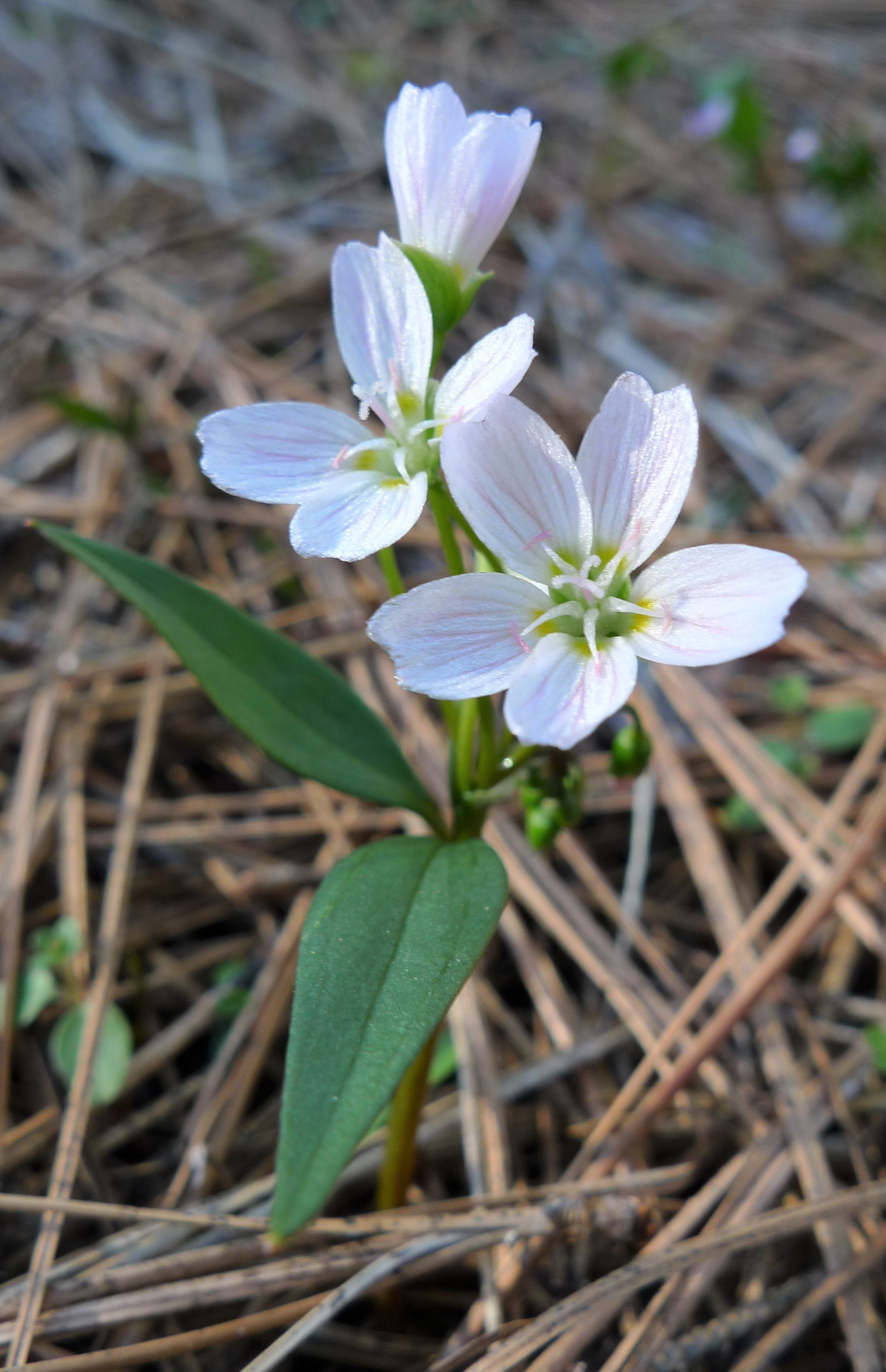

Conservation status
- Secure (NatureServe)

Scientific classification
- Kingdom: Plantae
- Clade: Tracheophytes
- Clade: Angiosperms
- Clade: Eudicots
- Order: Caryophyllales
- Family: Montiaceae
- Genus: Claytonia
- Species: C. lanceolata

Binomial name
- Claytonia lanceolata Pursh

Synonyms
- List: Claytonia caroliniana var. chrysantha (Greene) B.Boivin; Claytonia caroliniana var. lanceolata (Pursh) S.Watson; Claytonia caroliniana var. sessilifolia Torr.; Claytonia chrysantha Greene; Claytonia lanceolata var. chrysantha (Greene) C.L.Hitchc.; Claytonia lanceolata f. chrysantha (Greene) H.St.John; Claytonia lanceolata subsp. chrysantha (Greene) Ferris; Claytonia lanceolata var. idahoensis R.J.Davis; Claytonia lanceolata var. sessilifolia (Torr.) A.Nelson; Claytonia sessilifolia (Torr.) Henshaw

= Claytonia lanceolata =

Plant species in the springbeauty family

Claytonia lanceolata is a species of wildflower in the family Montiaceae, known by the common names lanceleaf springbeauty and western springbeauty.

== Description ==
This somewhat rare plant is native to western North America, growing in the sagebrush steppe and foothills up to alpine slopes. It thrives in the rocky soil of alpine climates where the snow never melts. It is a perennial herb growing from a tuber one to three centimeters wide. It produces a short, erect stem reaching a maximum height of 15 cm (6 in). At its smallest the plant bears only its first two rounded leaves before flowering and dying back. Its thick leaves are helpful for storing water. If it continues to grow it produces two thick, lance-shaped leaves further up the stem. The star-shaped flowers come in inflorescences of three to fifteen blooms and they are white or pink, often with veiny stripes and yellow blotches near the base of each petal. The fruit is a small capsule containing a few seeds, which are black and shiny.

== Uses ==
The entire plant is edible raw or cooked, including the potato-like corm from which it grows. Some report that the bulbs must be cooked to remove toxins.

Native Americans ate the roots and pods, which can be cooked and eaten like potatoes. The leaves can be eaten raw or cooked.

The Okanogan-Colville, Okanogan, and Nlaka'pamux Native American peoples used the tuber of this plant for food and for animal fodder.

=== Cultivation ===
Western spring beauty is occasionally grown in gardens by those interested in wildflower gardening. Outside their native habitat they will not persist if subjected to either extreme drying during the summer or being flooded during rainstorms.
