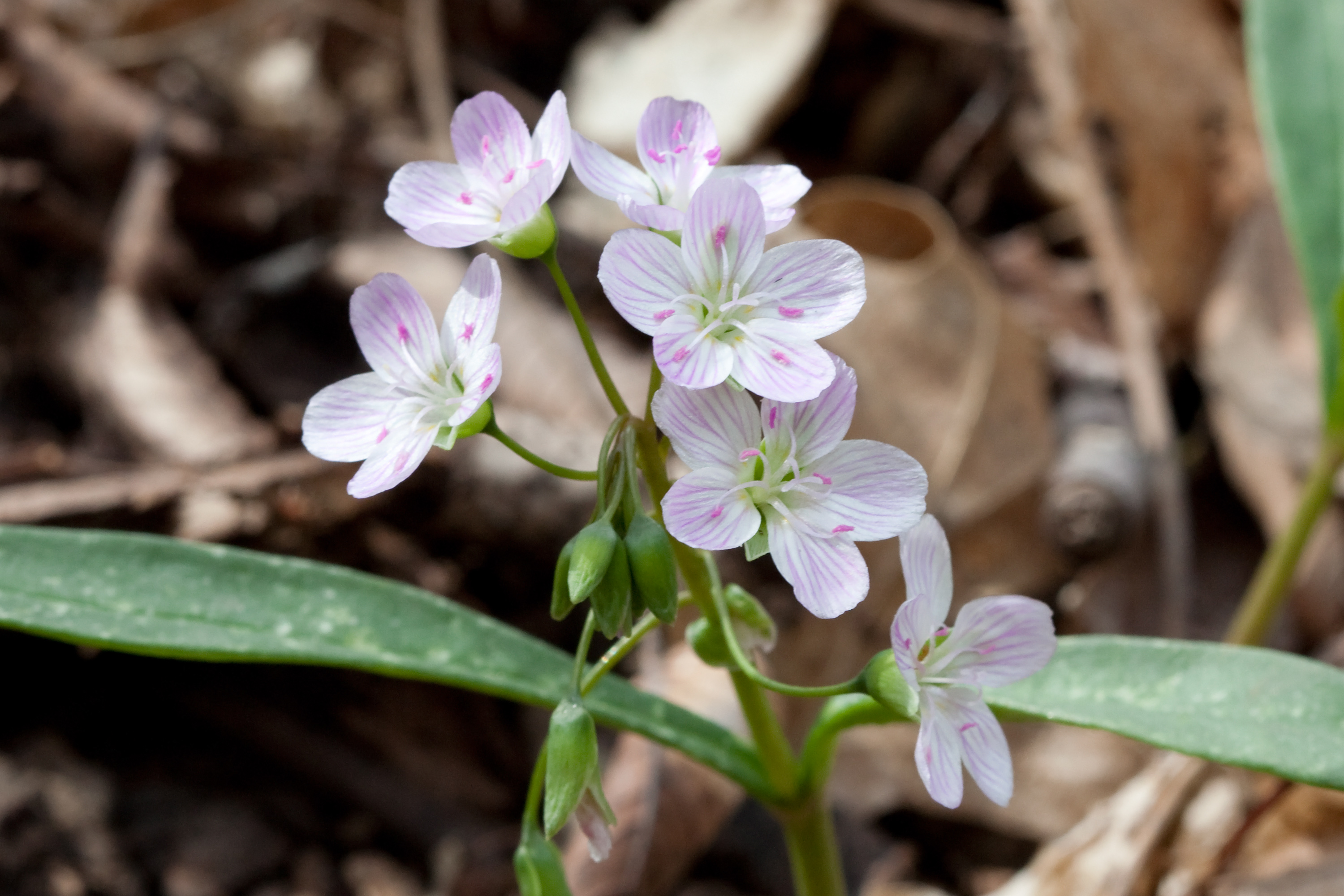
- Eastern spring beauty at Radnor Lake

Conservation status
- Secure (NatureServe)

Scientific classification
- Kingdom: Plantae
- Clade: Embryophytes
- Clade: Tracheophytes
- Clade: Angiosperms
- Clade: Eudicots
- Order: Caryophyllales
- Family: Montiaceae
- Genus: Claytonia
- Species: C. virginica

Binomial name
- Claytonia virginica L.
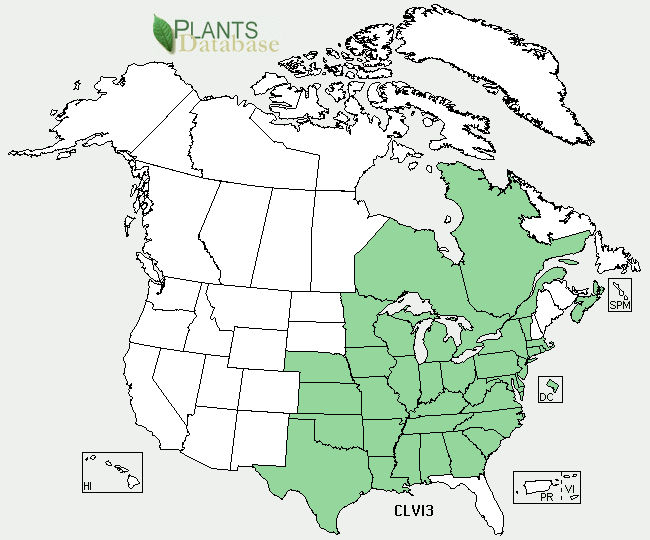
- Natural range in North America

= Claytonia virginica =

Species of plant

Claytonia virginica, the Virginia springbeauty, eastern spring beauty, grass-flower narrowleaf springbeauty or fairy spud, is an herbaceous perennial plant in the family Montiaceae. Its native range is eastern North America. Its scientific name honors Colonial Virginian botanist John Clayton (1694–1773).

== Description ==
Springbeauty is a perennial plant, overwintering through a tuberous root. It is a trailing plant growing to 5–40 cm (2–16 in) tall. The leaves are slender lanceolate, 3–14 cm (1 1/4–5 1/2 in) long and 0.5–2 cm (0.20–0.79 in) broad, with a 6–20 cm (2 1/4–7 3/4 in) long petiole.

The flowers are 0.7–1.4 cm (0.28–0.55 in) in diameter with five pale pink or white (rarely yellow) petals, and reflect UV light. It has a raceme inflorescence, in which its flowers branch off of the shoot. The individual flowers bloom for three days, although the five stamens on each flower are only active for a single day. Flowering occurs between March and May depending on part of its range and weather. The seeds are between 0.2 and 0.3 cm (0.08 and 0.12 in) in diameter and a shiny black. The seeds are released from the capsule fruit when it breaks open. Elaiosomes are present on the seeds and allow for ant dispersal.

Claytonia virginica is a cytologically complex taxon, including diploids with n=6, 7, 8 and 9, and tetraploids, hexaploids, octaploids and dodecaploids. The largest number of chromosomes (2n=ca. 191) was observed in the New York area.

== Habitat and range ==
Springbeauty is found in the Eastern temperate deciduous forest of North America. It is noted for its abundance throughout many parts of its range, especially in forests. The plant can be found throughout many different habitat types including lawns, city parks, forests, roadsides, wetlands, bluffs, and ravines.

== Hammond's yellow spring beauty ==
Hammond's yellow spring beauty, Claytonia virginica var. hammondiae, is a varietal with a very small range and population in a few areas of Northwestern New Jersey.

== Uses ==
This plant has been used medicinally by the Iroquois, who would give a cold infusion or decoction of the powdered roots to children suffering from convulsions. They would also eat the raw roots believing that they permanently prevented conception. They would also eat the roots as food, as would the Algonquin people, who cooked them like potatoes. The bulbs are rich in starch. When they are cooked, the taste has been described to be similar to chestnuts, while when raw, it has been said to taste like radishes. The roots are rich in vitamin A and C.

Spring beauty corms along with the entire above ground portion of the plant are safe for human consumption. The leaves can be cooked in salted water or steamed, although are not choice eating.
