= Sky Pilot =

Sky Pilot may refer to:

== Slang ==
- Slang term (19th century, Western American) for a religious preacher; see Hobo § Culture
- Slang term (20th century, British and American) for a military chaplain
- Pejorative (20th century, Wobbly lingo) for a member of the clergy who counsels passive acceptance of existing sociopolitical structures

== Science ==
- Polemonium viscosum, a North American wildflower
- Polemonium eximium, a Western American wildflower
- Phacelia sericea, a Western American wildflower commonly called "Sky-pilot"

== Art ==
- "Sky Pilot" (song), a 1968 song by Eric Burdon & The Animals
- The Sky Pilot, a 1921 film directed by King Vidor
- The Sky Pilot, an 1899 novel by Ralph Connor
- "Sky Pilot", a 1955 episode of American drama anthology series Navy Log
- Sky Pilot, a 1918 cover for Wheels magazine by Lawrence Atkinson

== Geographical features ==
- Sky Pilot Creek (Manitoba), a river in Canada
- Sky Pilot Lake, a lake of Carbon County, Montana
- Sky Pilot Mountain (British Columbia), Canada
- Sky Pilot Mountain (Montana), United States

== See also ==
- Skypilot, an Australian rock band
