= Great polemonium =

Great polemonium is a common name for several plants and may refer to:

- Polemonium carneum
- Polemonium occidentale
