= Skunk weed =

Skunk weed may refer to:

- Skunk (cannabis), a breed of cannabis
- Navarretia squarrosa, California stinkweed
- Polemonium confertum, Rocky Mountain skypilot
- Polemonium viscosum, Sky pilot
- Symplocarpus foetidus, Eastern skunk cabbage
- Croton texensis, Skunk weed
