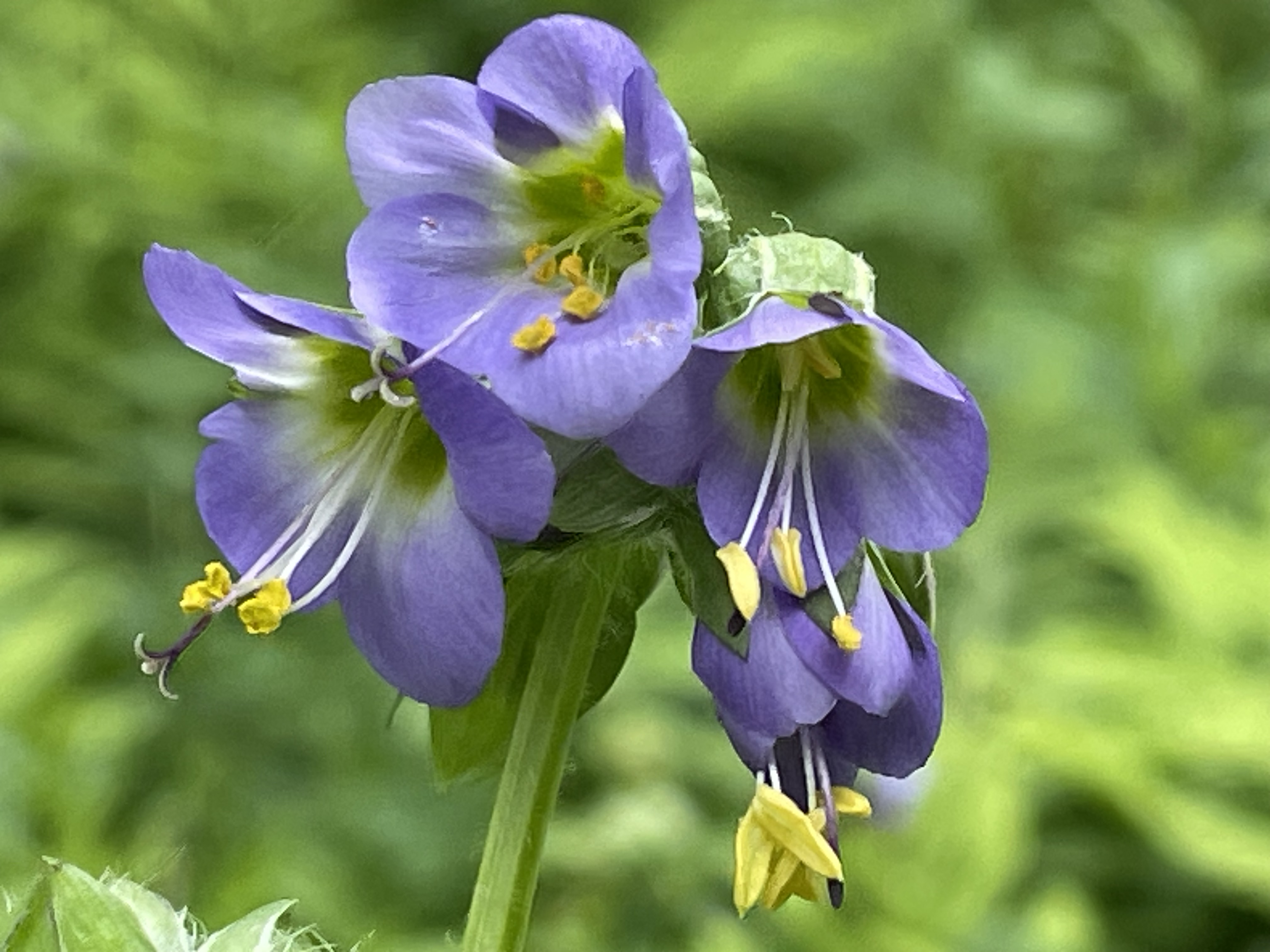
- Green Mountain National Forest, Addison County, Vermont (June 23)

Conservation status
- Vulnerable (NatureServe)

Scientific classification
- Kingdom: Plantae
- Clade: Tracheophytes
- Clade: Angiosperms
- Clade: Eudicots
- Clade: Asterids
- Order: Ericales
- Family: Polemoniaceae
- Genus: Polemonium
- Species: P. vanbruntiae

Binomial name
- Polemonium vanbruntiae Britton

= Polemonium vanbruntiae =

Species of flowering plant

Polemonium vanbruntiae is a species of flowering plant in the phlox family Polemoniaceae. It is known by the common names Appalachian Jacob's ladder, bog Jacob's-ladder, and Vanbrunt's polemonium. It is native to eastern Canada and the northeastern United States.

== Description ==
Polemonium vanbruntiae is a perennial herb that grows erect from a horizontal rhizome, reaching one meter in maximum height. The leaves are each made up of 7 to 10 pairs of lance-shaped or nearly oval leaflets. The inflorescence is a corymb of purple-blue flowers with yellow centers. The stamens and stigmas protrude from the bell-shaped corolla.

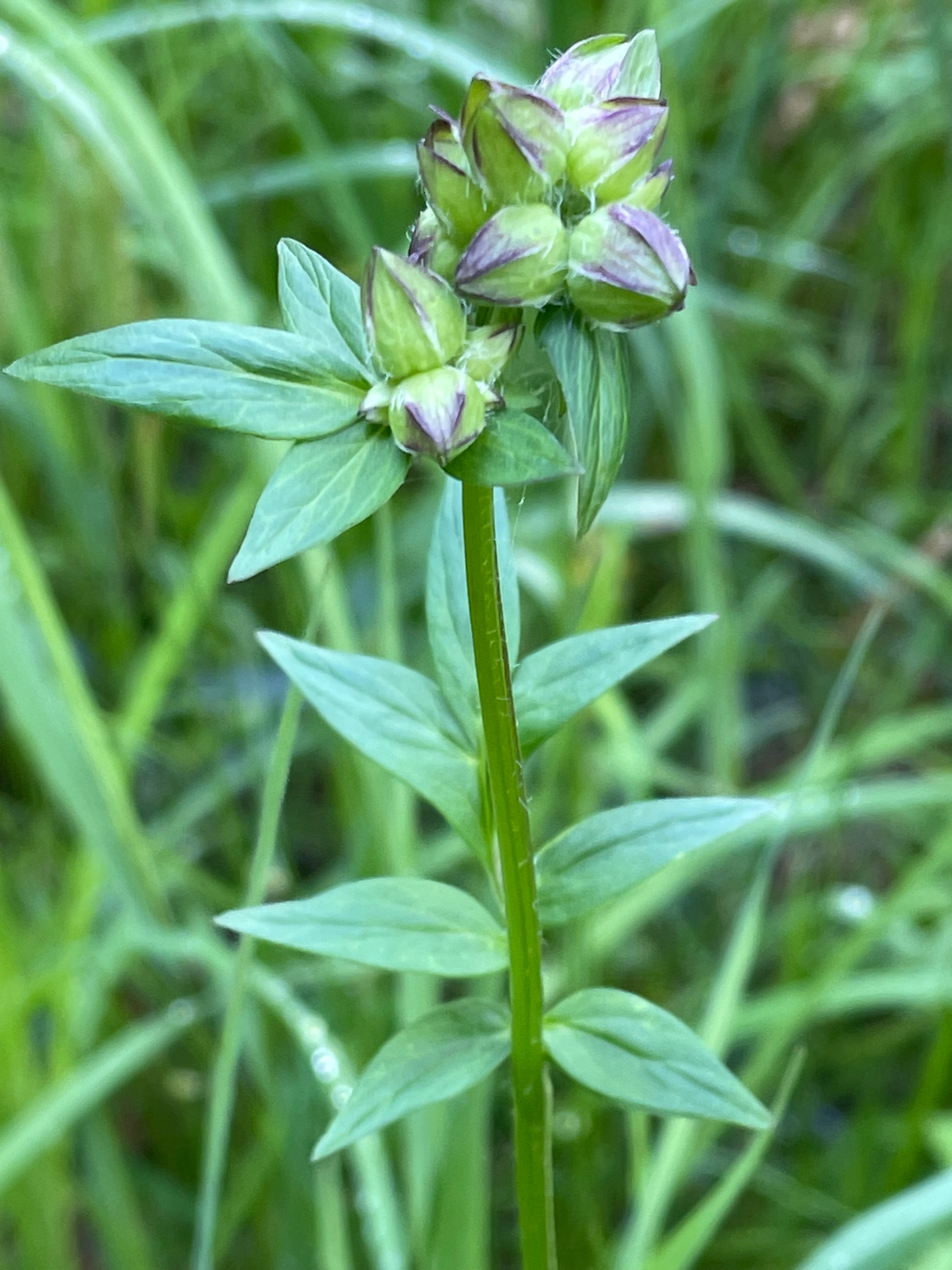
Flower buds (June 15)

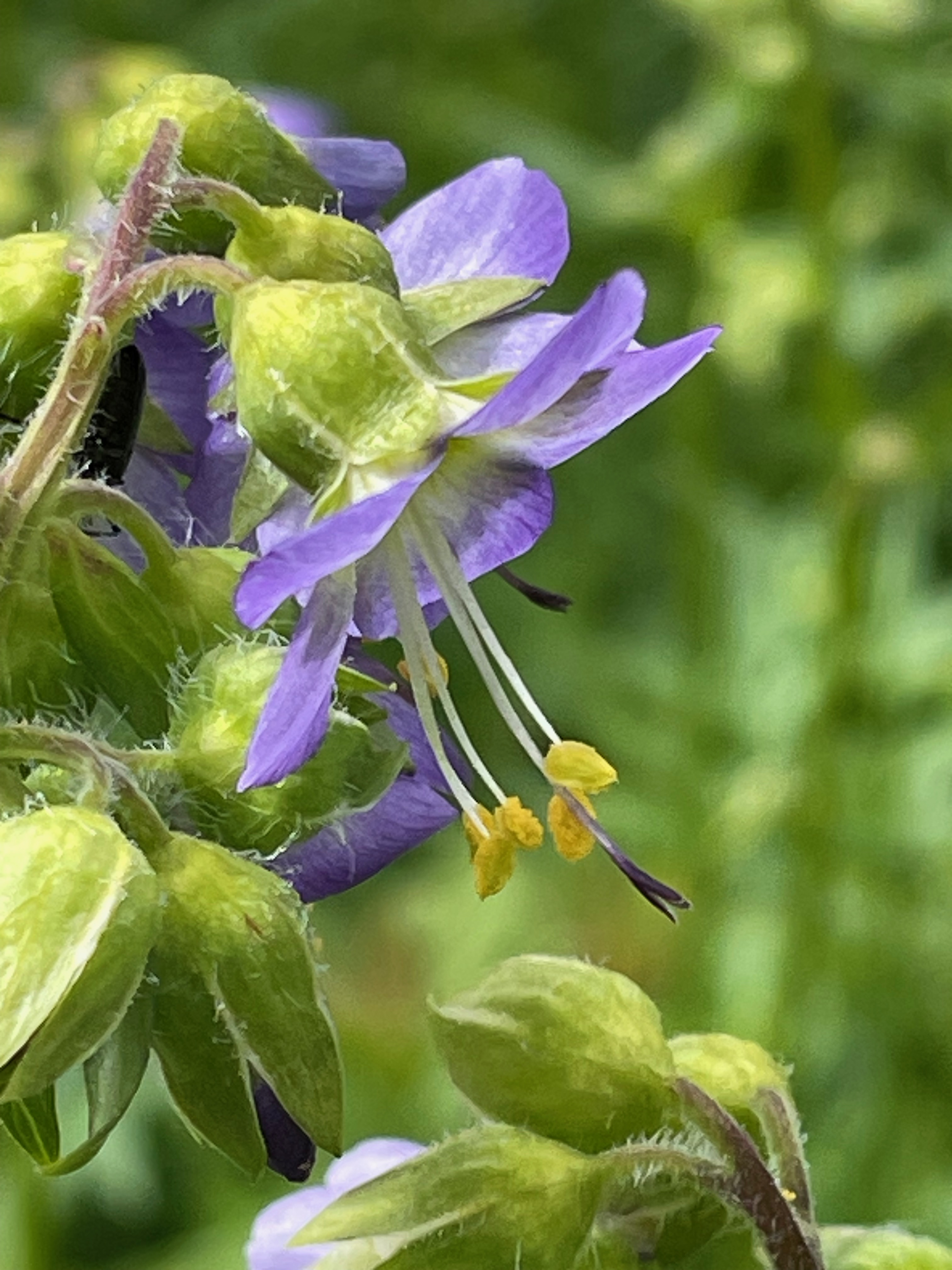
Flowers (June 23)

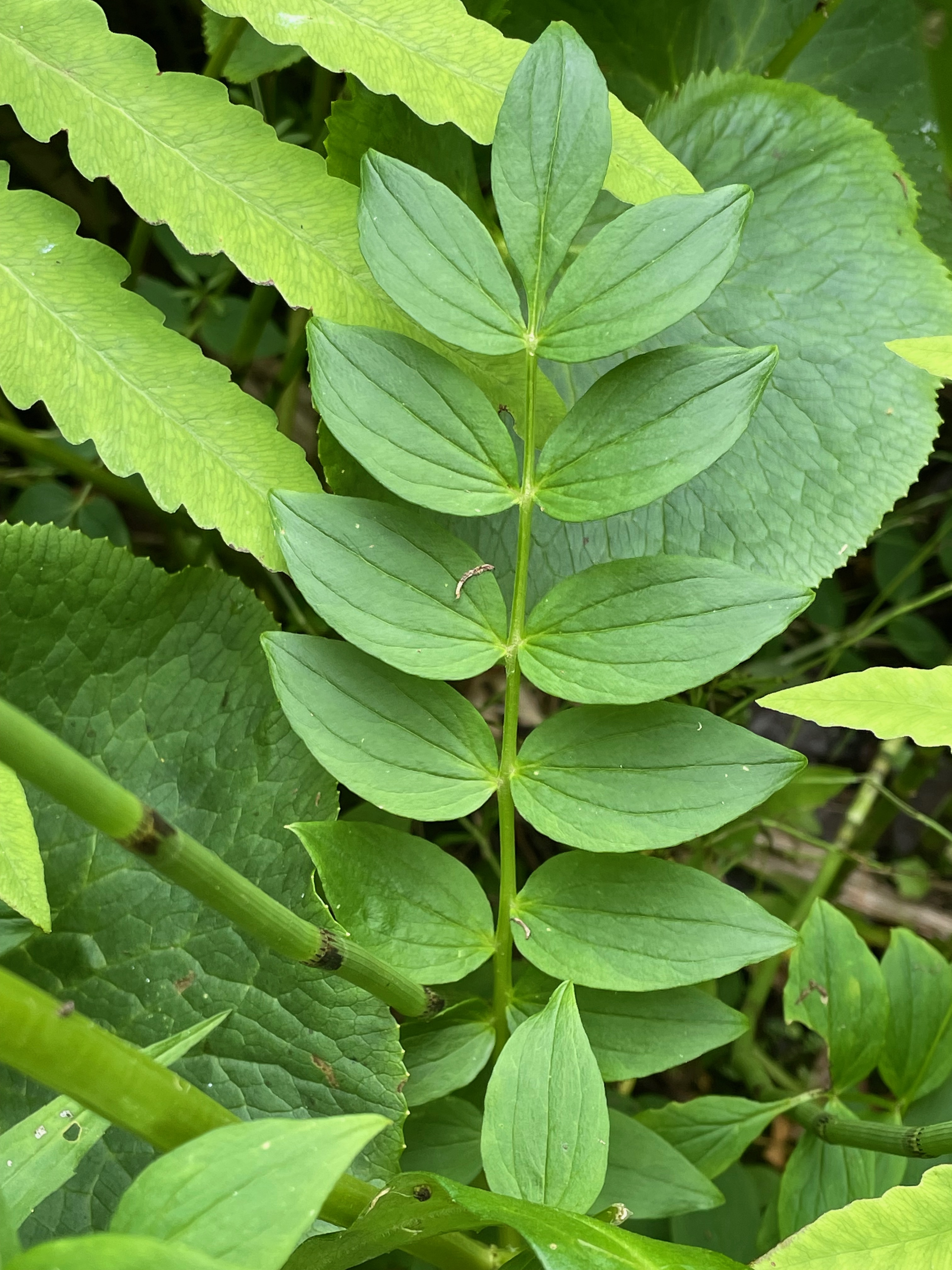
Compound leaf (June 23)

Polemonium vanbruntiae is similar to P. caeruleum and P. reptans.

== Taxonomy ==
Polemonium vanbruntiae was described and named by the American botanist Nathaniel Lord Britton in 1892. In large part, Britton based his description on specimens collected by Mrs. Van Brunt in the Catskill Mountains in Ulster County, New York in 1890: "I take pleasure in dedicating it to the lady who has supplied such fine and numerous specimens". Consequently, Polemonium vanbruntiae Britton is commonly called Van Brunt's Jacob's-ladder (or Vanbrunt's polemonium).

== Distribution and habit ==
Polemonium vanbruntiae can be found from New Brunswick and Quebec south to Maryland and West Virginia. It is not common anywhere but it is probably most abundant in New York. It tolerates a wide variety of wetland habitat types including swamps, bogs, marshes, and wet spots along roadsides. Its habitat is often saturated, but not flooded.

== Ecology ==
Polemonium vanbruntiae reproduces both sexually and vegetatively, although the relative importance of each is not known. Plants typically flower from mid-June to late-July.

== Conservation ==
The global conservation status of Polemonium vanbruntiae is vulnerable (G3G4). It is imperiled (S2) in Maryland, Quebec, Vermont, and West Virginia; critically imperiled (S1) in Maine, New Brunswick, and Pennsylvania; and presumed extirpated (SX) in New Jersey.

The main threat to the species is the destruction and degradation of wetland habitat, for example, by flooding during dam construction. Habitat is also lost outright in the conversion to agriculture and other uses. Succession may be a threat in some areas, as the plant's open habitat becomes shaded when large and woody vegetation moves in. It is adapted to some level of disturbance in the habitat.

== Uses ==
Polemonium vanbruntiae is sometimes cultivated for garden use.

== Bibliography ==
- Britton, N. L. (July 1892). "New or noteworthy North American phanerogams, VI". Bulletin of the Torrey Botanical Club. 19 (7). New York: 219–226. doi:10.2307/2475813. JSTOR 2475813.
