= Sky Pilot Mountain =

Sky Pilot Mountain may refer to:

- Sky Pilot Mountain (Montana)
- Sky Pilot Mountain (British Columbia)
