= Greek valerian =

Greek valerian is a common name for several plants and may refer to:

- Polemonium caeruleum, native to Europe and northern Asia
- Polemonium reptans, native to North America
