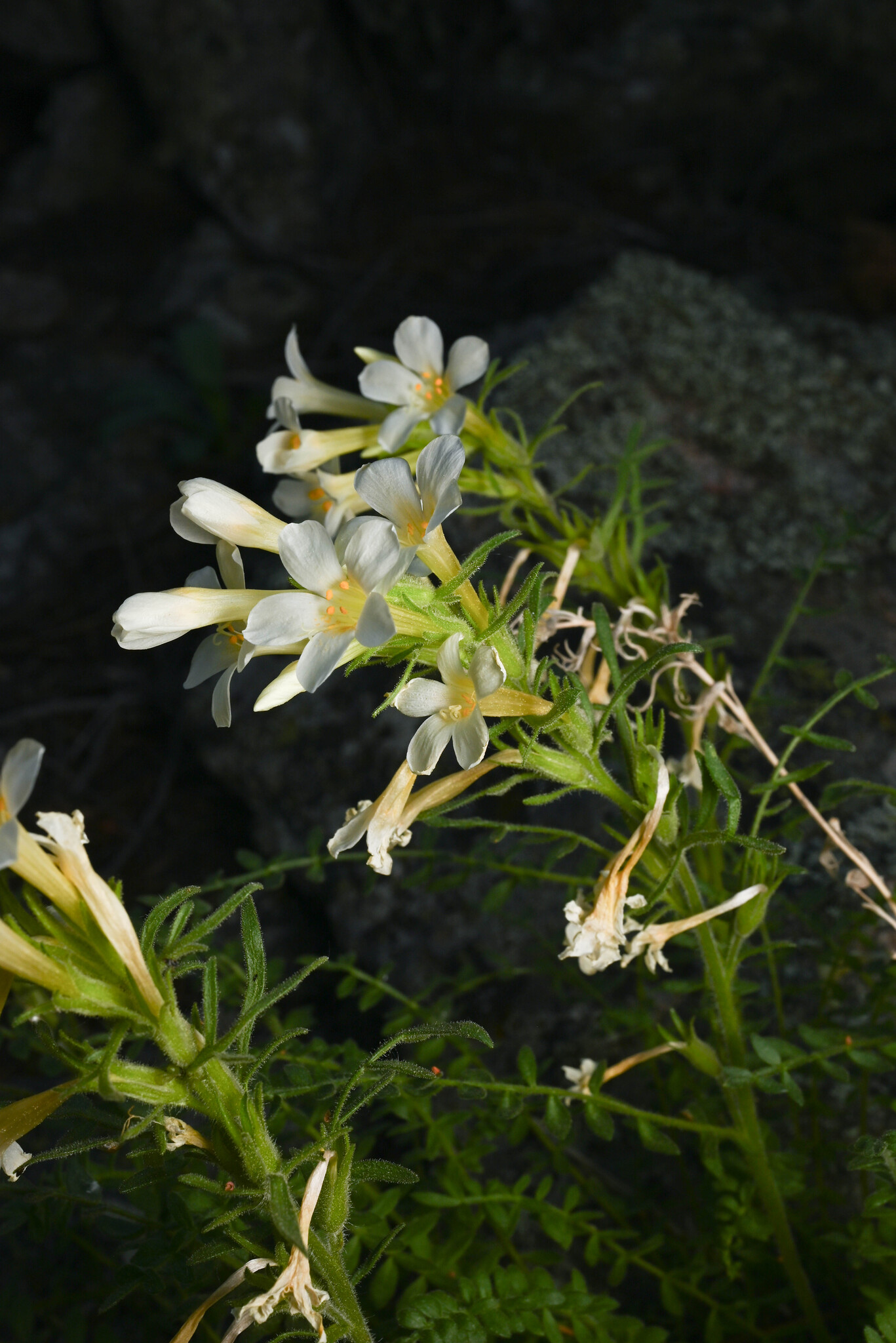
- Rocky Mountain National Park

Conservation status
- Apparently Secure (NatureServe)

Scientific classification
- Kingdom: Plantae
- Clade: Tracheophytes
- Clade: Angiosperms
- Clade: Eudicots
- Clade: Asterids
- Order: Ericales
- Family: Polemoniaceae
- Genus: Polemonium
- Species: P. brandegeei

Binomial name
- Polemonium brandegeei (A.Gray) Greene

Synonyms
- Gilia brandegeei; Navarretia brandegeei; Polemonium mellitum

= Polemonium brandegeei =

Plant species in the phlox family

Polemonium brandegeei, commonly pale sky pilot or honey skypilot, is a plant species in the phlox family.

== Description ==
Pale sky pilot is a herbaceous plant that usually grows 8 to 24 centimeters (3–9.5 in) tall, but occasionally will be as much as 32 cm (13 in). It is a perennial that grows from a branching caudex atop a wide taproot. Both its leaves and its stems smell quite strongly.

Most of it leaves are basal, rather than being attached to the stems. They are compound pinnate leaves have 17 to 45 crowded leaflets, with the leaf measuring 1.7 to 2 cm long overall. The leaflets are further divided into two or three parts, each elliptic to spatulate in shape, usually 3–10 mm long.

The flowers are white to light-yellow with a narrow funnel shape to the fused petals that open to five lobes that are shorter than the tube of the flower, 2.1 to 3.1 cm long. Its inflorescence is longer with the flowers less crowded than other species of Polemonium.

The fruit is a capsule, 3.8–5.5 mm long and 2.8–3.2 mm wide, somewhat egg shaped to nearly spherical. The reddish-brown seeds are 1.8–3.1 mm long with a wing at one end.

== Taxonomy ==
In 1876 Asa Gray scientifically described a species which he named Gilia brandegeei. It was moved to the genus Polemonium in 1887 by Edward Lee Greene to give the species its accepted name. Together with its genus it is part of the Polemoniaceae family. Polemonium brandegeei does not have any accepted subspecies or varieties, but several have been described and are among its eleven synonyms. In many botanical books its name is also spelled Polemonium brandegei, with one 'e'.

Table of Synonyms
Name	Year	Rank	Notes
Gilia brandegeei A.Gray	1876	species	≡ hom.
Gilia brandegeei var. lambornii A.Gray	1878	variety	= het.
Navarretia brandegeei (A.Gray) Kuntze	1891	species	≡ hom.
Polemonium brandegeei var. lambornii Brand	1907	variety	= het.
Polemonium brandegeei f. lambornii (Brand) Wherry	1942	form	= het.
Polemonium brandegeei subsp. mellitum (A.Gray) Wherry	1942	subspecies	= het.
Polemonium brandegeei subsp. typicum Wherry	1942	subspecies	≡ hom., not validly publ.
Polemonium confertum var. mellitum A.Gray	1863	variety	= het.
Polemonium mellitum (A.Gray) A.Heller	1899	species	= het.
Polemonium viscosum subsp. mellitum (A.Gray) J.F.Davidson	1950	subspecies	= het.
Polemonium viscosum var. mellitum (A.Gray) B.Boivin	1972	variety	= het.
Notes: ≡ homotypic synonym; = heterotypic synonym

=== Names ===
The species was given its scientific name after the botanist Townshend Stith Brandegee. Polemonium brandegeei is known by the common names pale sky pilot, honey skypilot, honey polemonium, or Brandegee Jacob's ladder.

== Range and habitat ==
Pale sky pilot is native to five western US states, New Mexico, Colorado, Utah, Wyoming, and South Dakota. In New Mexico it grows in just three northern counties, Bernalillo, Sandoval, and Taos. It grows throughout the mountains of Colorado and into Wyoming to Big Horn County in the north of the state. A single specimen was collected from the Tushar Mountains in Piute County, Utah, but it has not been spotted since and might be locally extinct. It is only found in the Black Hills in South Dakota on granite outcrops. It grows at elevations of 3,050 to 4,115 meters (10,000–13,500 ft).

It often grow in crevices in cliffs and outcrops, in rock slides, and the scree at the base of cliffs in alpine areas. It is less of an alpine species than sky pilot (Polemonium viscosum).
