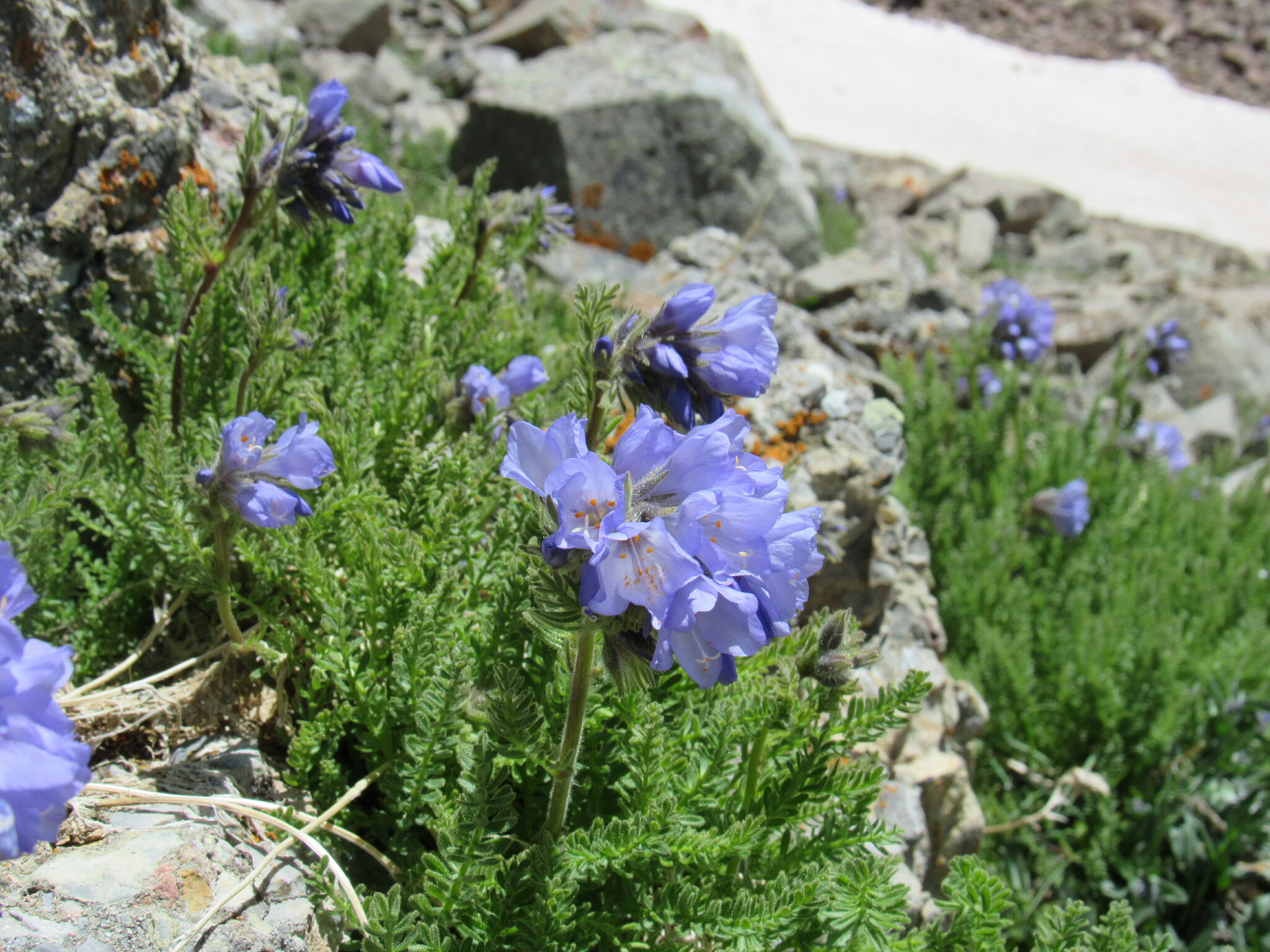
- Avery Peak north of Gothic, in the Maroon Bells–Snowmass Wilderness

Conservation status
- Apparently Secure (NatureServe)

Scientific classification
- Kingdom: Plantae
- Clade: Embryophytes
- Clade: Tracheophytes
- Clade: Angiosperms
- Clade: Eudicots
- Clade: Asterids
- Order: Ericales
- Family: Polemoniaceae
- Genus: Polemonium
- Species: P. confertum

Binomial name
- Polemonium confertum A.Gray

Synonyms
- Polemonium grayanum

= Polemonium confertum =

Plant species in the phlox family

Polemonium confertum, the Rocky Mountain skypilot or Rocky Mountain Jacob's-ladder, is a species in the phlox family that only grow in the mountains of Colorado in alpine areas.

== Description ==
Rocky Mountain skypilot is a herbaceous plant that grows flowering stems of just 7 to 26 centimeters (3–10 in) tall. It is perennial that grows from a taproot topped by a branched caudex and mostly basal leaves. The root branches significantly at depths of 8–10 cm (3–4 in) and again at its end at depths as much as 50 cm (20 in). The plants also develop rhizomes, underground stems, which form a horizontal network at 4–8 cm under the soil surface. These turn upwards at the ends to produce new shoots each year, unlike most alpine plants in its habitat, where the shoots last for many years. The leaves are 20 to 40 cm (8–16 in) long and densely covered in glands atop tiny stalks or villous, long and soft, hairs. They have a strong, unpleasant odor and are densely divided two or three times into small leaflets, each just 4–10 millimeters long and 2–4 mm wide.

The flowers are light blue-violet and funnel shaped, 1.7–2.6 cm long and 1–1.5 cm wide with lobes that are shorter than the tubular portion of the fused petals. The stamens are usually clearly contained within the flower, but can occasionally be nearly as long as the lobes, and are tipped with bright orange-yellow pollen. The flowers are crowded together in an inflorescence that is spherical in shape and cymose. Though the round shape is often lost as the plant goes to seed, with the inflorescence lengthening somewhat.

The fruit is a capsule, egg shaped to nearly spherical, 3.8–5.5 mm long by 2.8–3.2 mm wide. Contained within the fruit are many reddish-brown, angular seeds, with a wing at one end, each 1.8–3.1 mm long and 0.7–1.2 mm wide.

It is very similar to sky pilot (Polemonium viscosum), but has wider, more open flowers, 10–15 mm wide where sky pilot's are just 5–10 mm wide. Rocky Mountain skypilot has flowers that pale blue instead of dark blue and with an inflorescence that is more globe shaped instead of fan shaped.

== Taxonomy ==
In 1863 a new species in the Polemonium genus was scientifically described by Asa Gray, which he gave the name Polemonium confertum. Together with its genus it is part of the Polemoniaceae family and has four heterotypic synonyms.

Table of Synonyms
Name	Year	Rank
Polemonium confertum mut. albiflorum Cockerell	1913	mutation
Polemonium confertum var. elatius Brand	1907	variety
Polemonium grayanum Rydb.	1904	species
Polemonium viscosum var. grayanum (Rydb.) Brand	1907	variety

=== Names ===
The species name, confertum, means "crowded together" in Botanical Latin. It is known by the common names Rocky Mountain skypilot, Rocky Mountain Jacob's-ladder, and Gray's sky pilot. Both this species and the related Polemonium viscosum are casually called skunkweed.

== Range and habitat ==
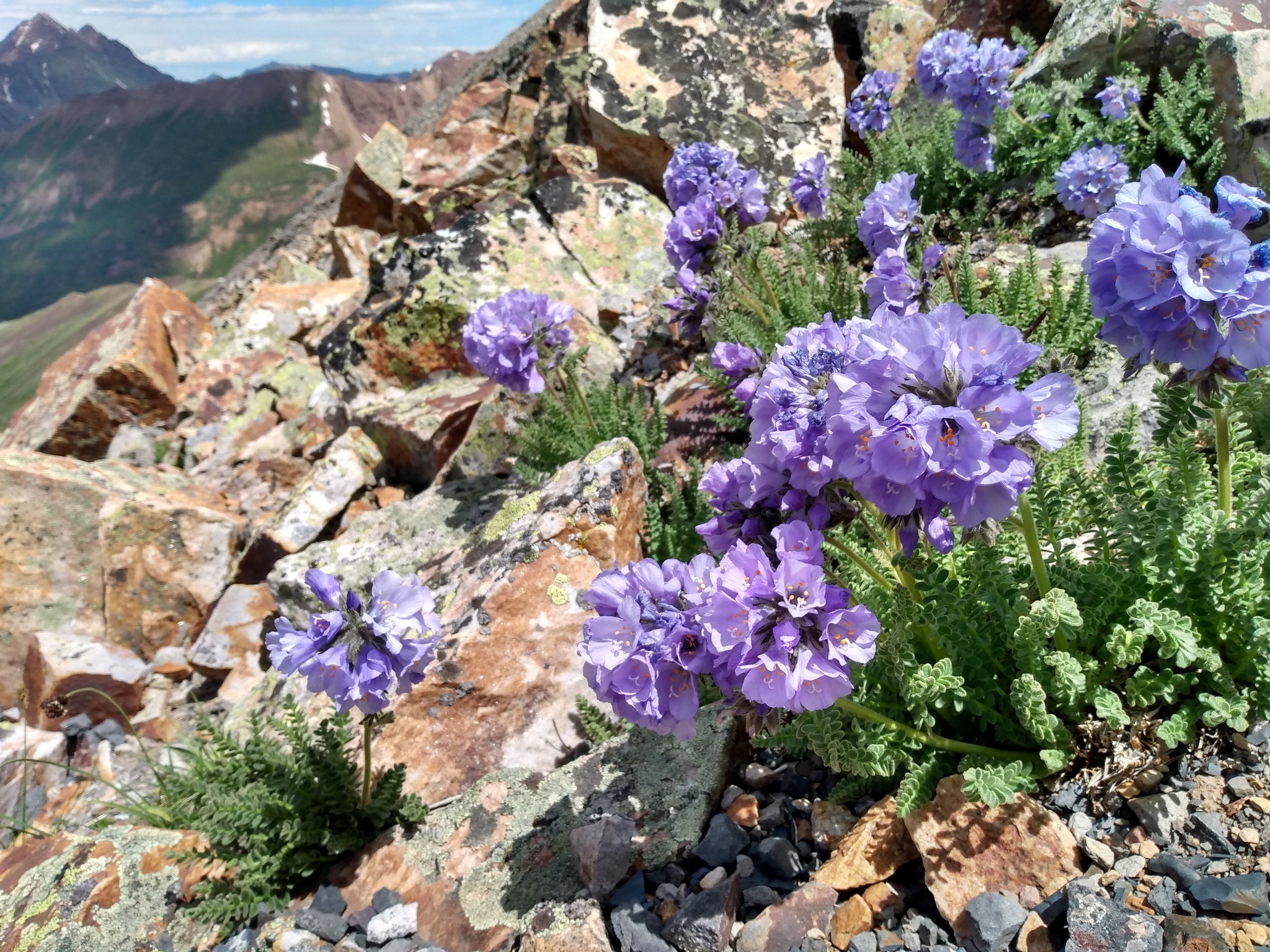
Dorothy Peak, Maroon Bells–Snowmass Wilderness

Rocky Mountain skypilot is endemic to the state of Colorado where it grow from the southwest to north-central areas of the state. In the southwest it grows in La Plata, Dolores, San Juan, Hinsdale, Gunnison, Saguache, and Alamosa counties. In the central part of the state the species is found in Chaffee, Pitkin, Park, Summit, Clear Creek, Grand, and Boulder counties. The species is recorded growing at elevations of 3,350 to 3,720 meters (11,000–12,200 ft). It generally grows on scree or talus, slopes of broken and loose stones and more specifically the rocky piles found at the base of cliffs, in the alpine zone.

Though it only grows in Colorado, its habitat is well protected and extensive. For this reason when it was reviewed by NatureServe in 1997 it was rated as apparently secure at the global and state level (G4/S4).

== Uses ==
Although not a common garden plant, Rocky Mountain skypilot has been grown in rock gardens since at least 1903. Like other Polemonium species, it grows well in deep, loamy soils that are well drained.
