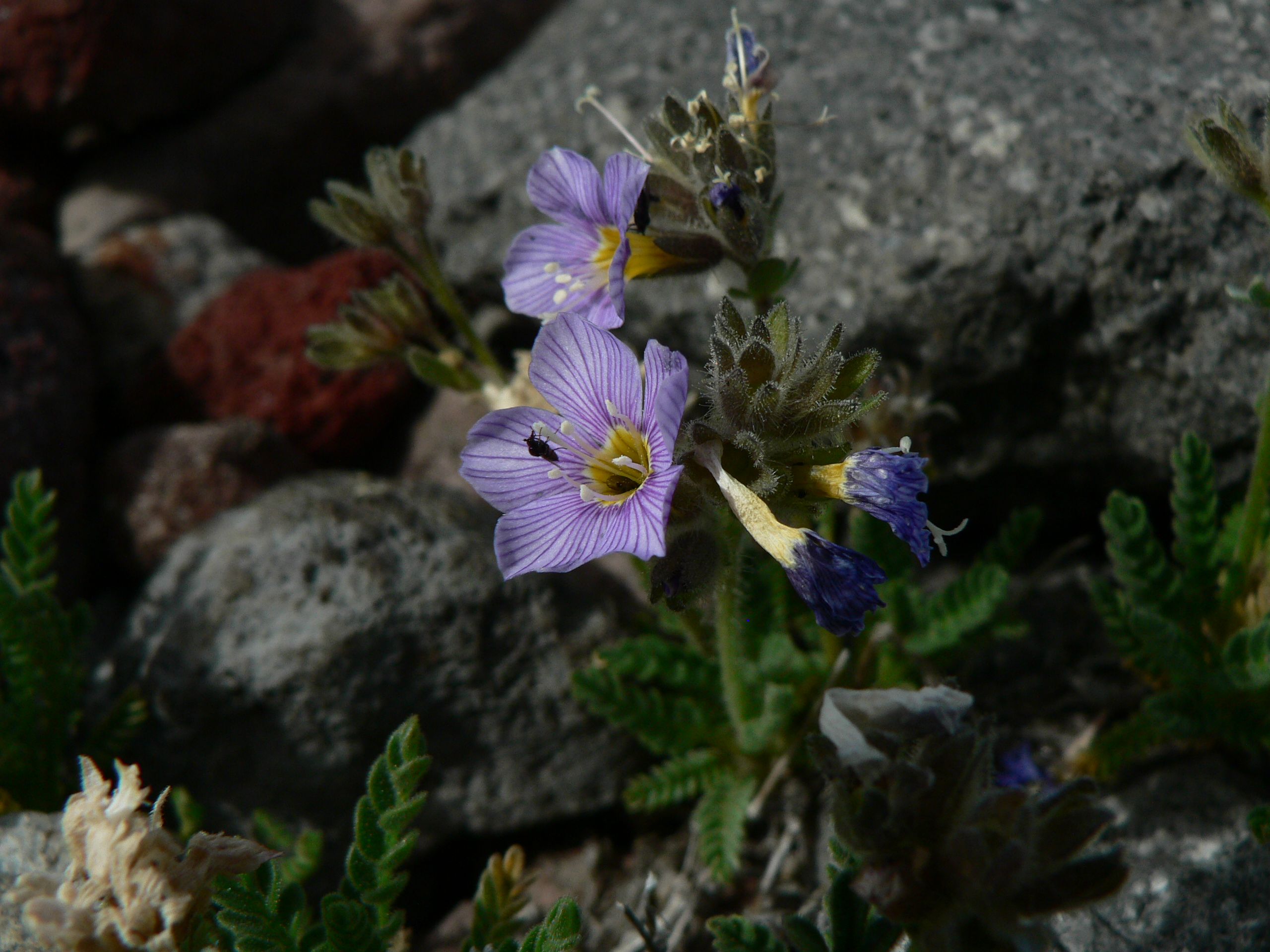

Conservation status
- Apparently Secure (NatureServe)

Scientific classification
- Kingdom: Plantae
- Clade: Embryophytes
- Clade: Tracheophytes
- Clade: Spermatophytes
- Clade: Angiosperms
- Clade: Eudicots
- Clade: Asterids
- Order: Ericales
- Family: Polemoniaceae
- Genus: Polemonium
- Species: P. elegans

Binomial name
- Polemonium elegans Greene 1898

= Polemonium elegans =

Species of flowering plant

Polemonium elegans, the elegant Jacob's-ladder, is species of the phlox family found in the United States.
