= Hopper Glacier =

Glacier in Montana, United States

- Location within Montana
- Type: Mountain glacier
- Location: Beartooth Mountains, Carbon County, Montana, U.S.
- Coordinates: 45°04′45″N 109°36′38″W
- Terminus: Talus
- Status: Unknown

Hopper Glacier is located in the US state of Montana. The glacier is situated east of Sky Pilot Mountain in the Beartooth Mountains at an elevation of 11,000 feet (3,400 m) above sea level.

== See also ==
- List of glaciers in the United States
