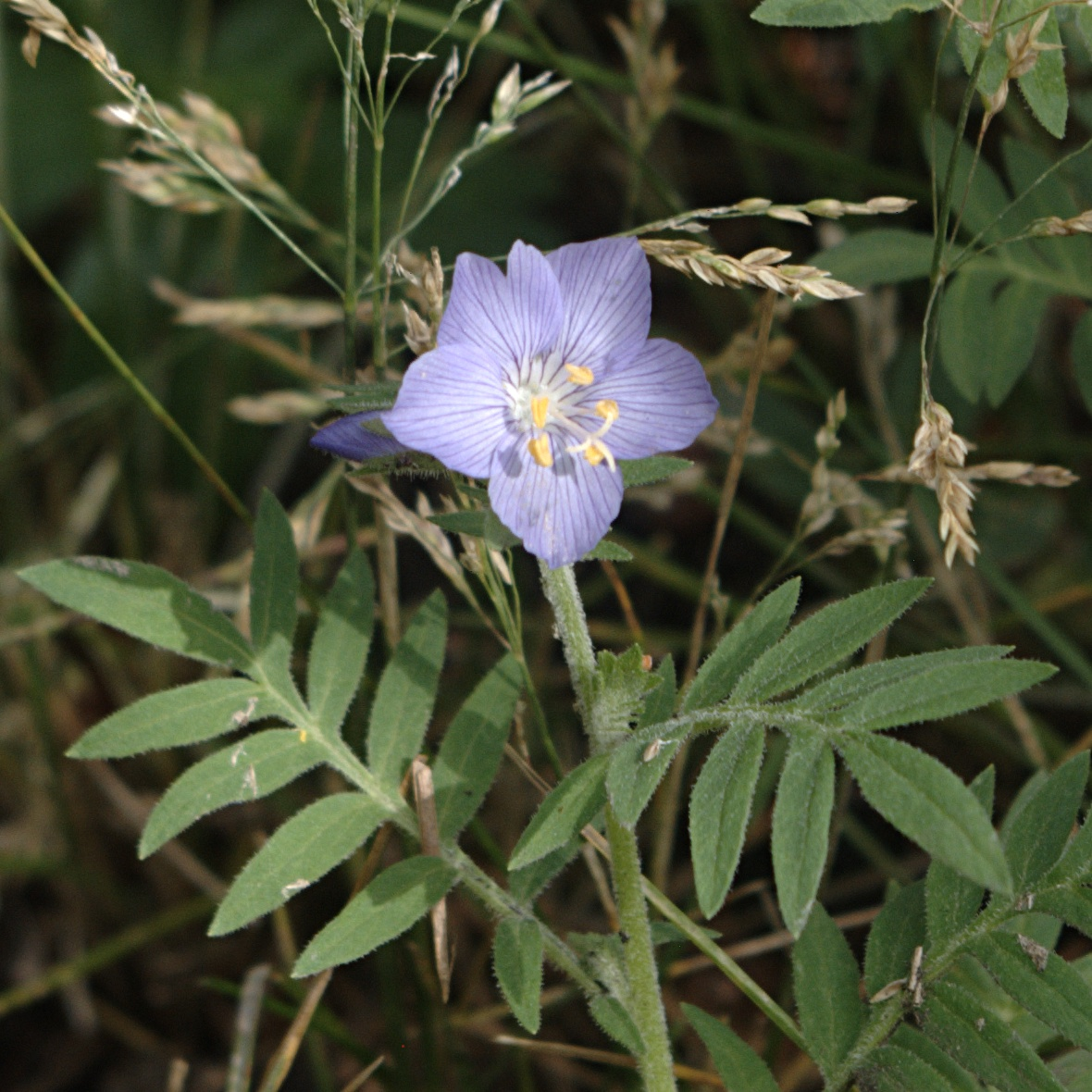
- In bloom

Conservation status
- Secure (NatureServe)

Scientific classification
- Kingdom: Plantae
- Clade: Embryophytes
- Clade: Tracheophytes
- Clade: Angiosperms
- Clade: Eudicots
- Clade: Asterids
- Order: Ericales
- Family: Polemoniaceae
- Genus: Polemonium
- Species: P. foliosissimum

Binomial name
- Polemonium foliosissimum A.Gray

Synonyms
- Polemonium archibaldiae; Polemonium molle; Polemonium pterospermum; Polemonium robustum

= Polemonium foliosissimum =

Plant species in the phlox family

Polemonium foliosissimum, the towering Jacob's-ladder, is a rare species of flowering plant in the phlox family Polemoniaceae, native to the western United States; Arizona, Colorado, New Mexico, and Utah. As its synonym Polemonium archibaldiae it has gained the Royal Horticultural Society's Award of Garden Merit.

== Taxonomy ==
In 1878 a new species in the Polemonium genus was scientifically described by Asa Gray, which he named Polemonium foliosissimum. Together with its genus it is part of the Polemoniaceae family. Although the species has no accepted subspecies or varieties, it has some among its ten botanical synonyms.

Table of Synonyms
Name	Year	Rank	Notes
Polemonium archibaldiae A.Nelson	1901	species	= het.
Polemonium filicinum var. archibaldiae (A.Nelson) Brand	1907	variety	= het.
Polemonium foliosissimum subsp. archibaldiae (A.Nelson) Wherry	1942	subspecies	= het.
Polemonium foliosissimum var. molle (Greene) Anway	1968	variety	= het.
Polemonium foliosissimum f. molle (Greene) Wherry	1942	form	= het.
Polemonium foliosissimum subsp. robustum (Rydb.) Brand	1907	subspecies	= het.
Polemonium foliosissimum subsp. verum Wherry	1942	subspecies	≡ hom., not validly publ.
Polemonium molle Greene	1905	species	= het.
Polemonium pterospermum A.Nelson & Cockerell	1903	species	= het.
Polemonium robustum Rydb.	1904	species	= het.
Notes: ≡ homotypic synonym; = heterotypic synonym
