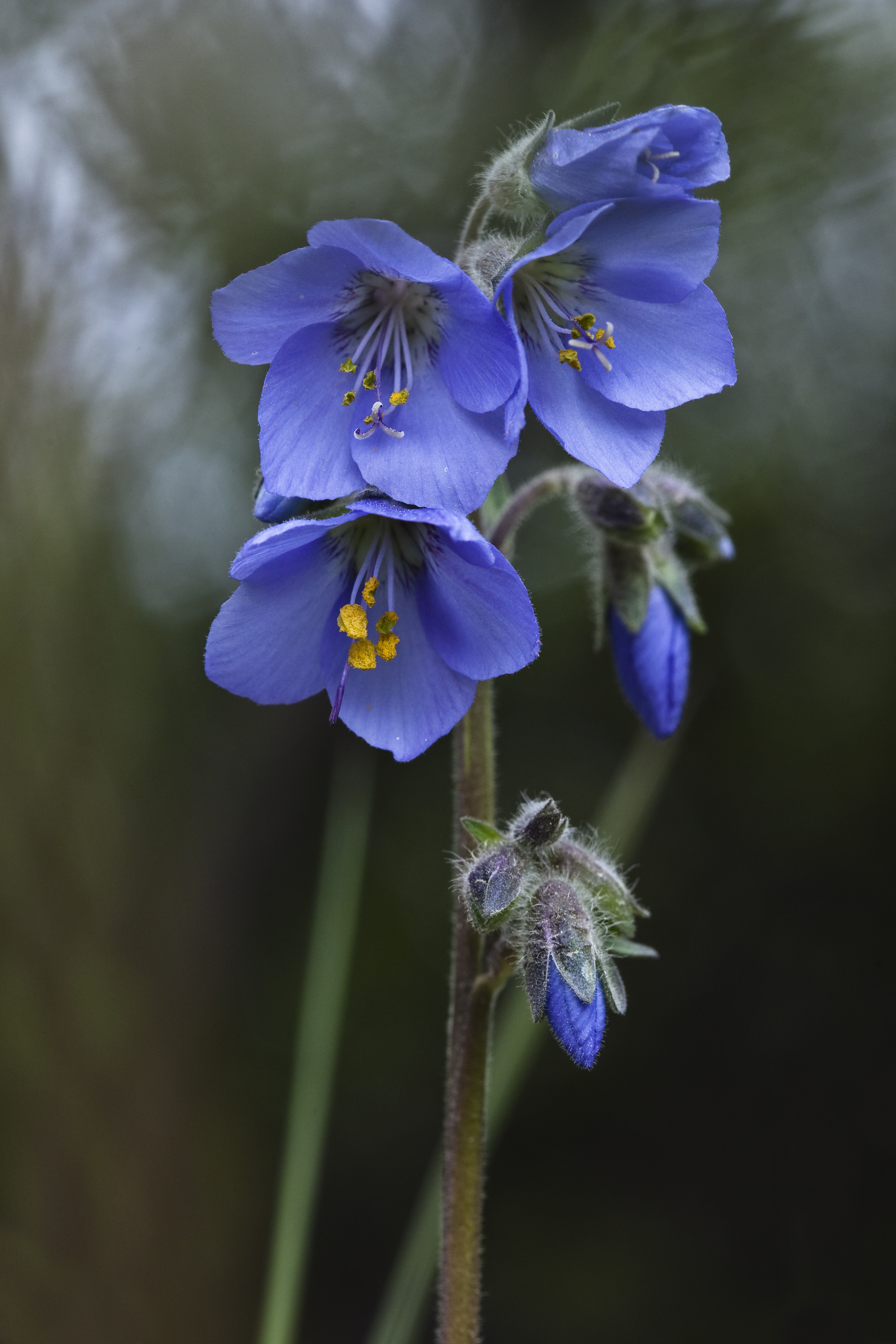
- At Denali National Park and Preserve in Alaska

Conservation status
- Least Concern (IUCN 3.1)

- Secure (NatureServe)

Scientific classification
- Kingdom: Plantae
- Clade: Embryophytes
- Clade: Tracheophytes
- Clade: Spermatophytes
- Clade: Angiosperms
- Clade: Eudicots
- Clade: Asterids
- Order: Ericales
- Family: Polemoniaceae
- Genus: Polemonium
- Species: P. acutiflorum

Binomial name
- Polemonium acutiflorum Willd. ex Roem. & Schult.

= Polemonium acutiflorum =

Species of flowering plant

Polemonium acutiflorum (syn. P. villosum), known as tall Jacob's-ladder, is a flowering plant in the family Polemoniaceae. It is native to much of the northern hemisphere.

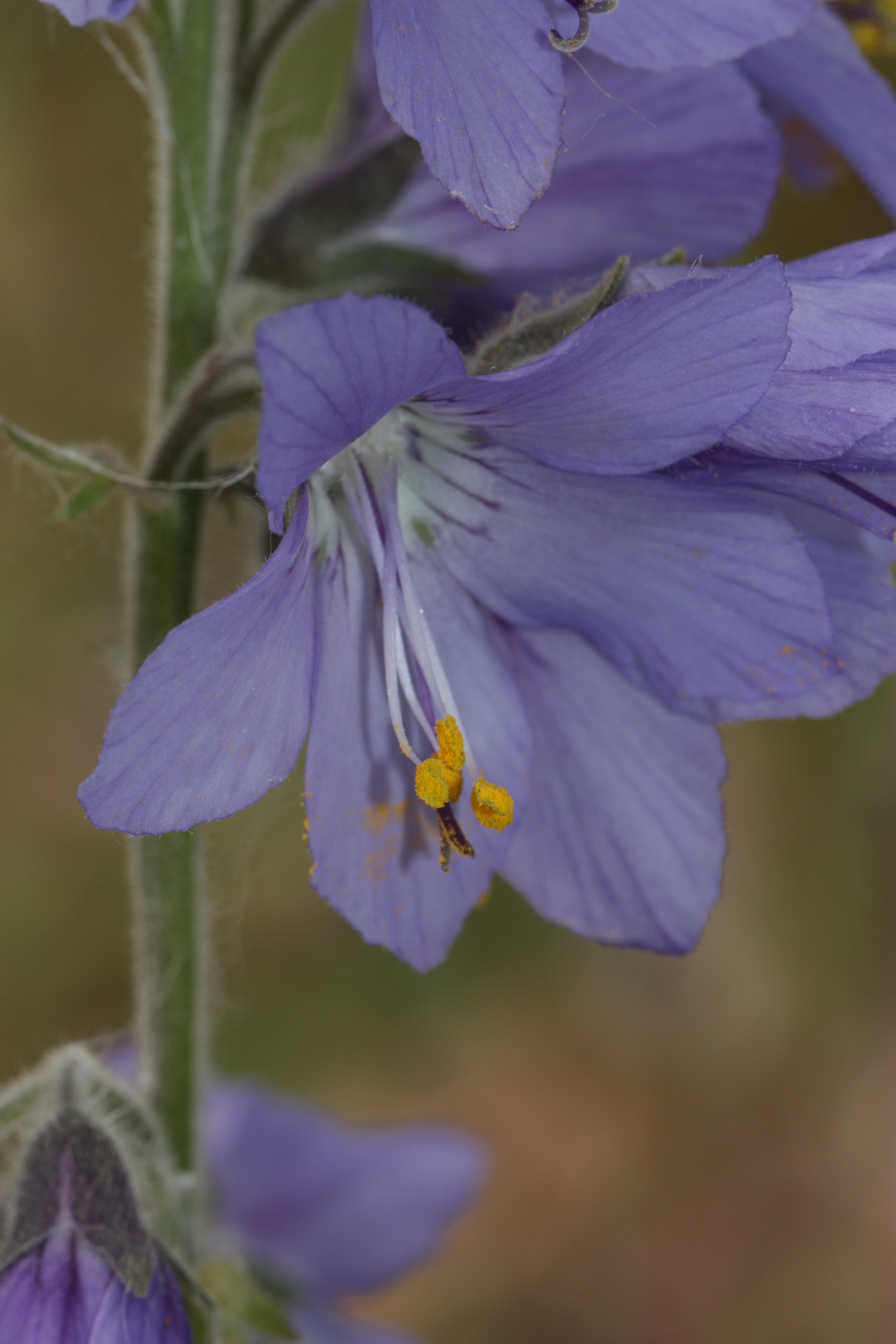
Flower

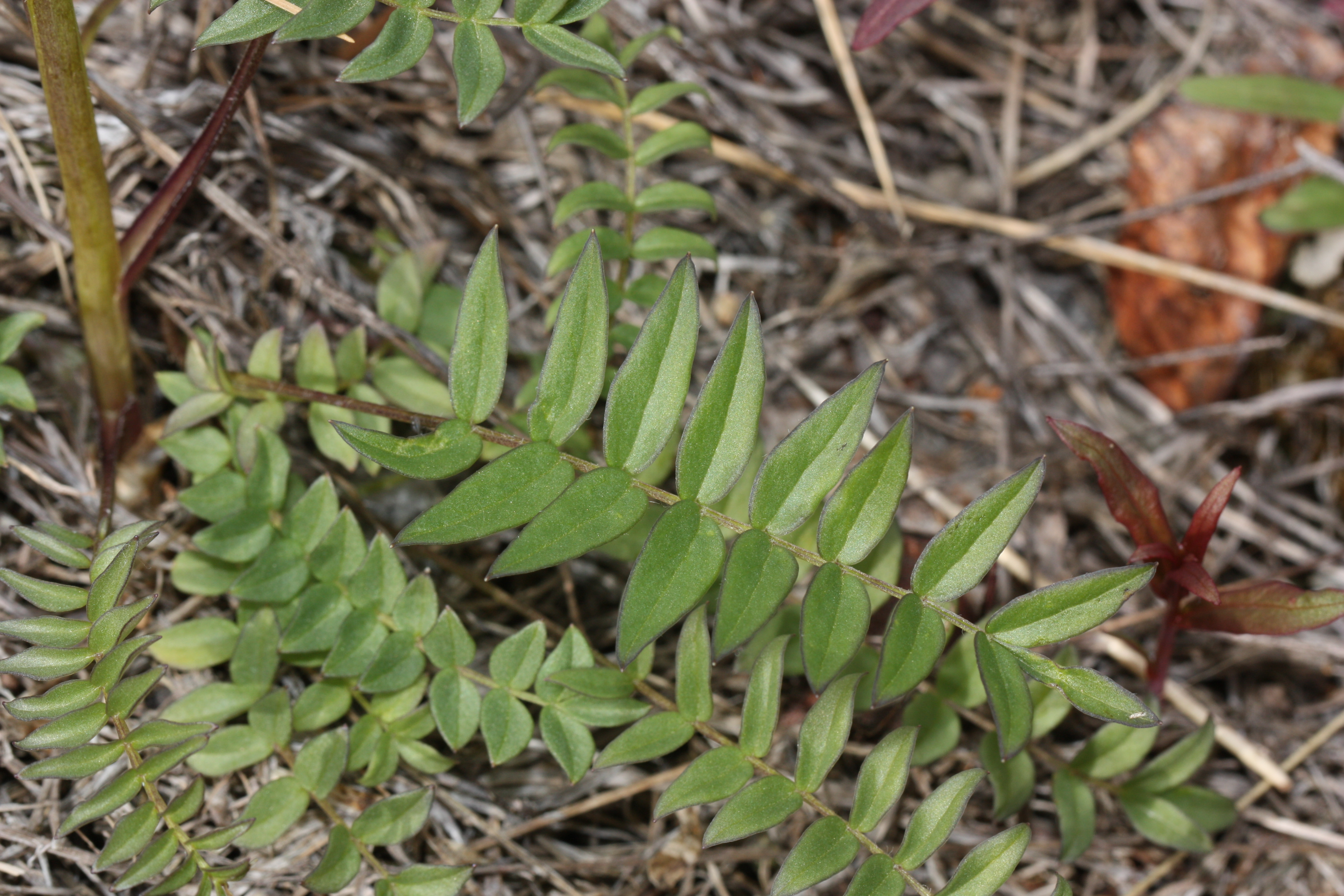
Pinnately divided leaf
