= Polemonium pectinatum =

Conservation status
- Imperiled (NatureServe)

Scientific classification
- Kingdom: Plantae
- Clade: Embryophytes
- Clade: Tracheophytes
- Clade: Spermatophytes
- Clade: Angiosperms
- Clade: Eudicots
- Clade: Asterids
- Order: Ericales
- Family: Polemoniaceae
- Genus: Polemonium
- Species: P. pectinatum

Binomial name
- Polemonium pectinatum Greene

Species of flowering plant

Polemonium pectinatum is a species of flowering plant in the phlox family known by the common names Washington Jacob's-ladder and Washington polemonium. It is endemic to the state of Washington in the United States, where it occurs in the Columbia Basin, including the Channeled Scablands and the Palouse.

== Description ==
This perennial herb grows from a taproot, producing a cluster of stems up to 80 centimetres (31 in) tall. The alternately arranged leaves are each made up of several linear-shaped leaflets up to 5 centimetres (2.0 in) long. The hairy, glandular inflorescence is an open array of white or lavender flowers with five corolla lobes. Flowering occurs in May through July.

=== Species ===
This species occurs in riparian habitat and seasonally moist depressions and bottomlands. Other species in the habitat may include Crataegus douglasii, Amelanchier alnifolia, Elymus cinereus, Rosa woodsii, and Ribes aureum.

There are about 26 occurrences of this species, divided into 6 or 7 populations. The plant's total distribution covers less than 2,500 acres (1,000 ha).

Threats to the species include overgrazing, though it can tolerate some grazing activity, being adapted to disturbance. Land use conversion is a threat, for example, the conversion of the Palouse grasslands to agriculture. Other threats include alterations in hydrology, herbicides, and introduced species.
