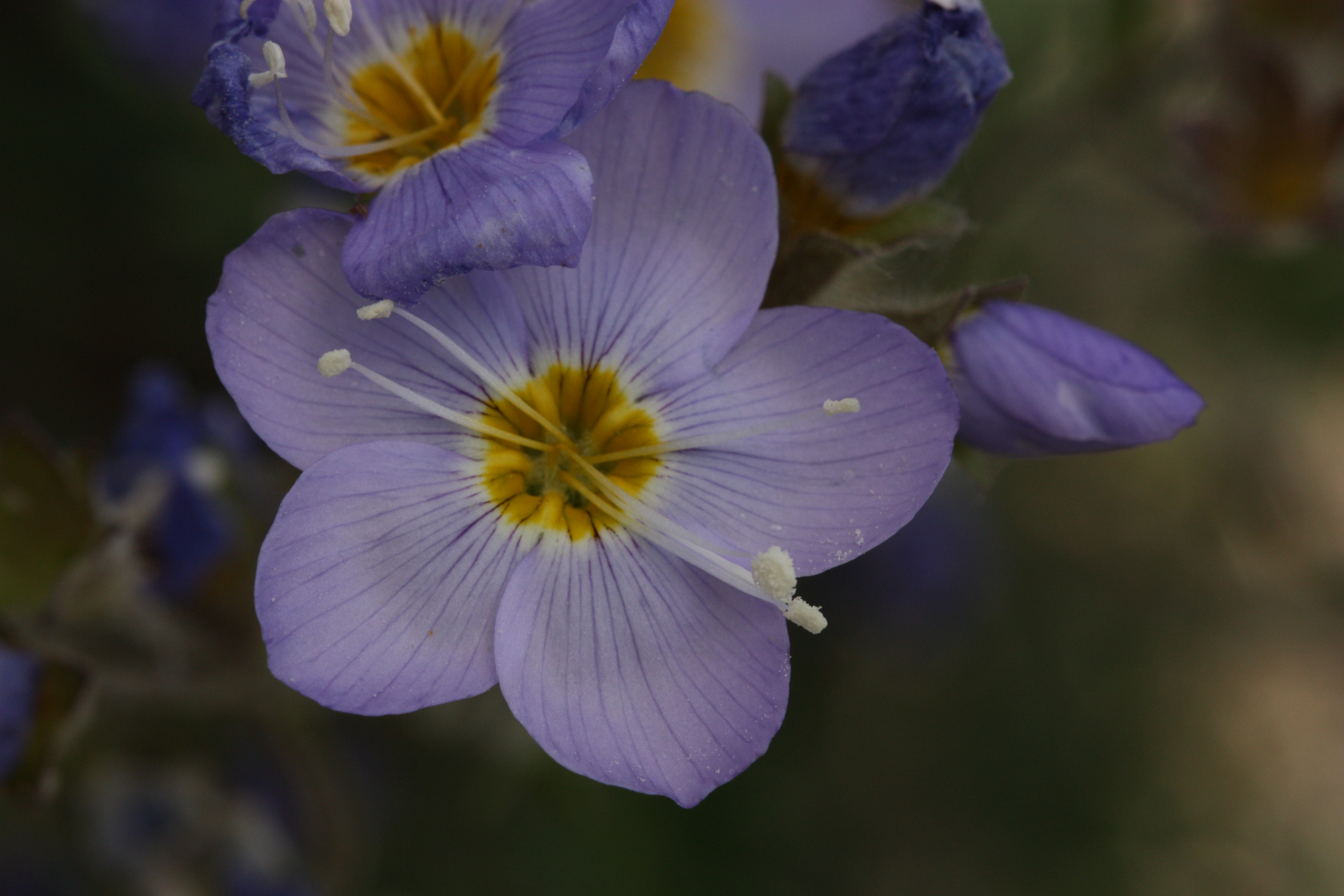
- Polemonium boreale near Matanuska Glacier, Alaska

Conservation status
- Least Concern (IUCN 3.1)

- Secure (NatureServe)

Scientific classification
- Kingdom: Plantae
- Clade: Embryophytes
- Clade: Tracheophytes
- Clade: Spermatophytes
- Clade: Angiosperms
- Clade: Eudicots
- Clade: Asterids
- Order: Ericales
- Family: Polemoniaceae
- Genus: Polemonium
- Species: P. boreale

Binomial name
- Polemonium boreale Adams

= Polemonium boreale =

Species of flowering plant

Polemonium boreale, the northern Jacob's-ladder or boreal Jacobs-ladder, is a plant native to most of the high arctic. In Greenland it is found only in a small area on the east coast. It is not very common.

The whole plant is pubescent, with long woolly hairs, glandular, and grows to 5–10 cm tall. The basal leaves are more or less alternate, and pinnate, with numerous leaflets. The flowers are produced in a more or less capitate inflorescence, each flower bell-shaped, blue, 15 mm long, 2.5 times longer than the calyx. The plant has a very unpleasant smell, and grows on gravelly slopes and in crevices.

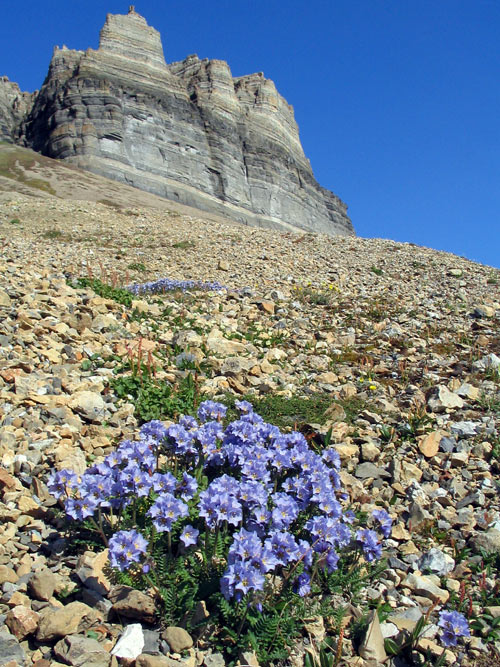
Native to most of the high arctic, its range includes Svalbard.

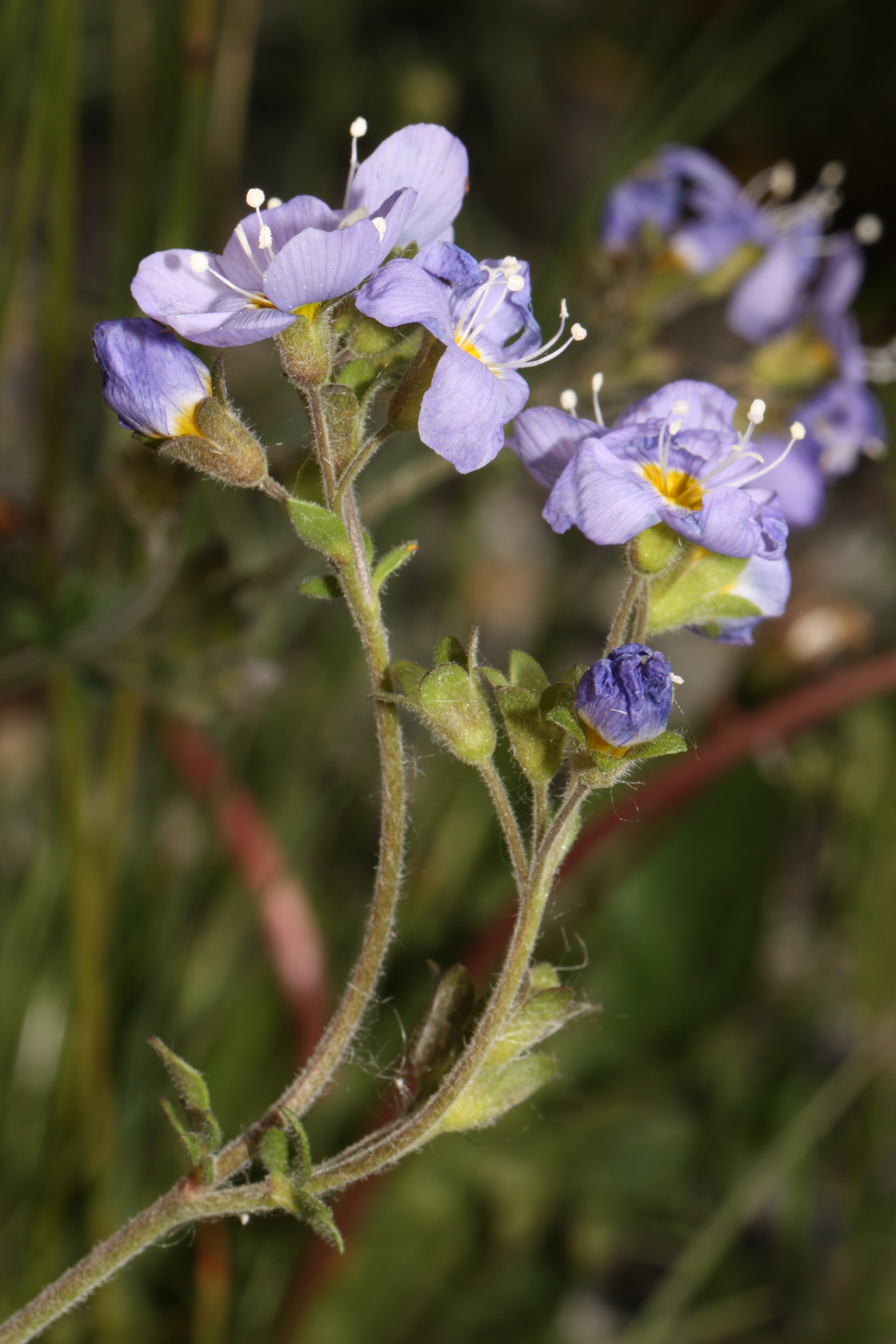
The inflorescence consists of 3—7 (exceptionally 9), 5–15 mm flowers.

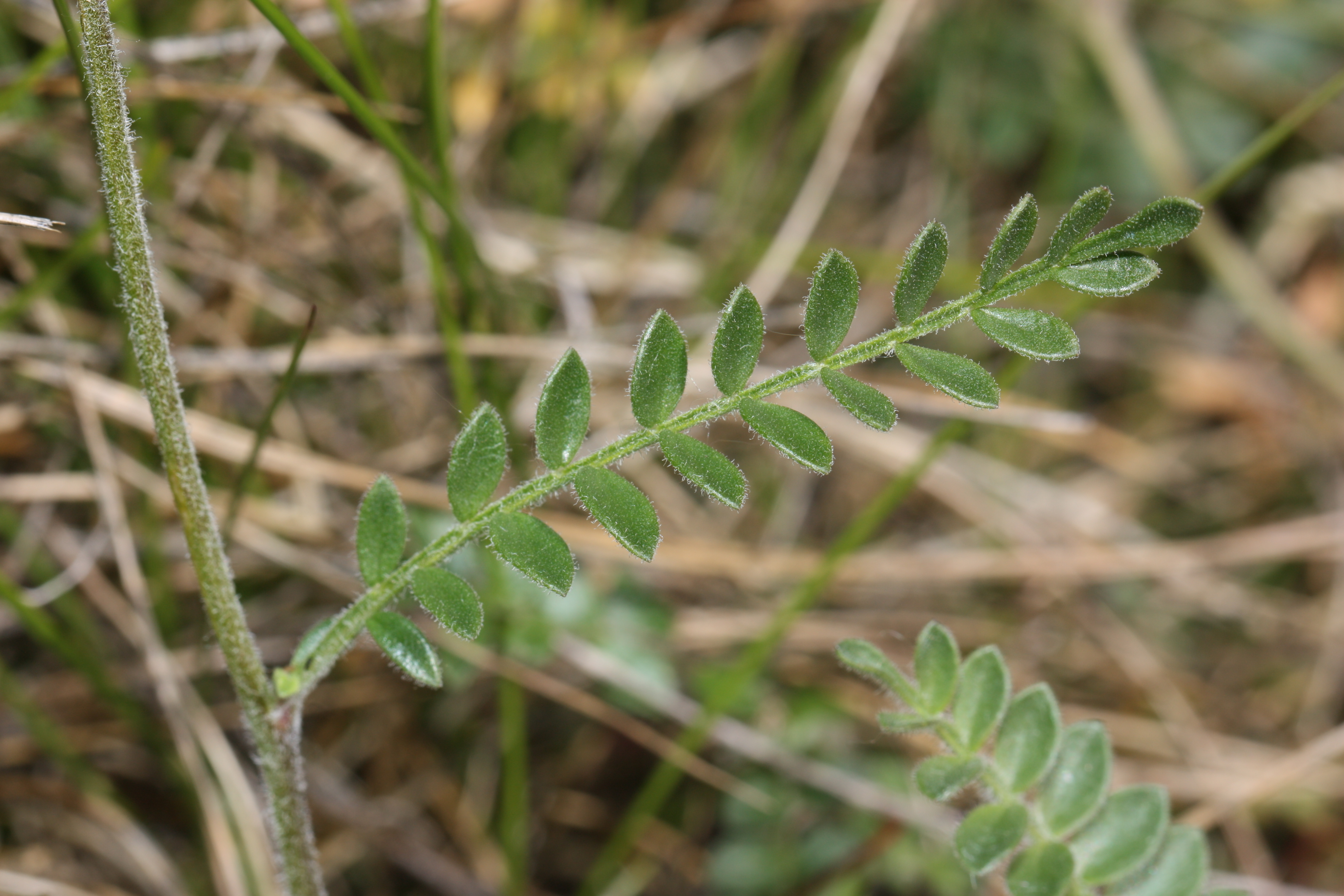
Basal leaves are pinnate with numerous small leaflets.
