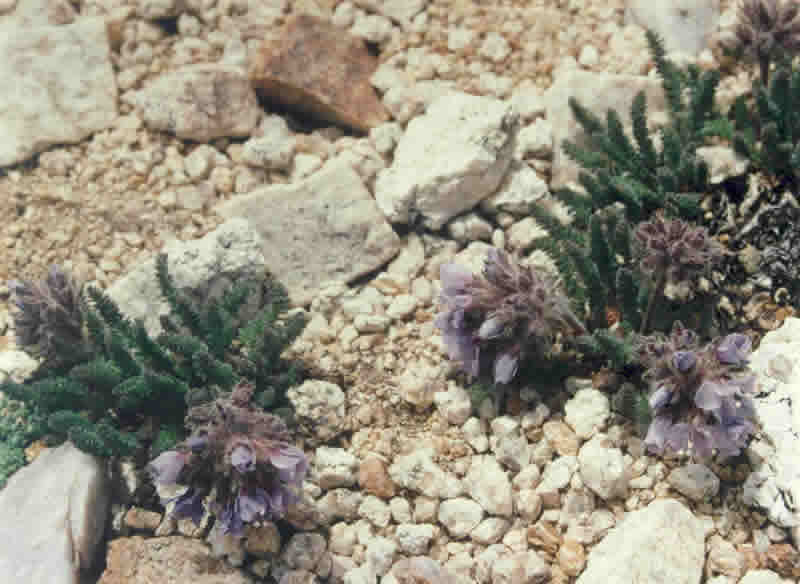

Conservation status
- Critically Imperiled (NatureServe)

Scientific classification
- Kingdom: Plantae
- Clade: Tracheophytes
- Clade: Angiosperms
- Clade: Eudicots
- Clade: Asterids
- Order: Ericales
- Family: Polemoniaceae
- Genus: Polemonium
- Species: P. chartaceum

Binomial name
- Polemonium chartaceum H.Mason

= Polemonium chartaceum =

Species of flowering plant

Polemonium chartaceum is a rare species of flowering plant in the phlox family known by the common names Mason's Jacob's-ladder and Mason's sky pilot. It is native to California, where it has a disjunct distribution. It occurs in the Klamath Mountains as well as the ranges east of the Sierra Nevada, including the White Mountains, where its distribution extends just into Nevada. It is a plant of high elevations, growing in exposed, rocky mountain slope habitat such as talus and alpine fellfields.

This is a perennial herb producing a small clump of a few erect stems reaching 20 centimeters in maximum height. Leaves clustered around the base of the stems are cylindrical bunches of many small, glandular leaflets. Each leaflet is deeply divided into lobes, making it appear like several leaflets growing together. The inflorescence is a headlike cluster of several flowers atop the short, stout stem. Each flower has a tubular calyx of densely hairy sepals and a five-lobed corolla in shades of pale blue with a whitish or yellowish throat.
