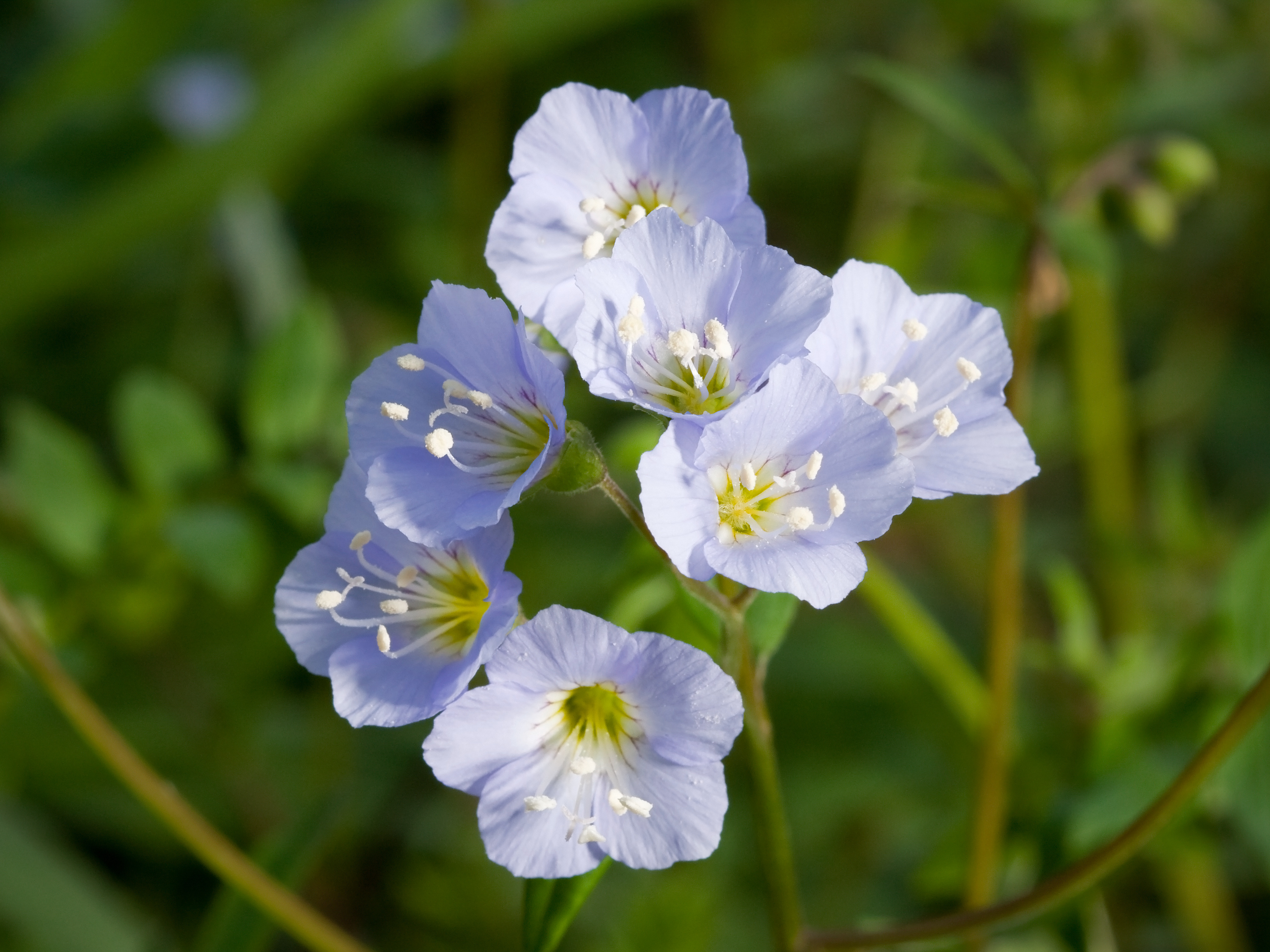
- Polemonium reptans

Scientific classification
- Kingdom: Plantae
- Clade: Embryophytes
- Clade: Tracheophytes
- Clade: Spermatophytes
- Clade: Angiosperms
- Clade: Eudicots
- Clade: Asterids
- Order: Ericales
- Family: Polemoniaceae
- Genus: Polemonium; L.

Type species
- Polemonium caeruleum L.

= Polemonium =

Genus of plants

Polemonium, commonly called Jacob's ladders or Jacob's-ladders (the name derived from the Biblical story), is a genus of between 25 and 40 species of flowering plants in the family Polemoniaceae, native to cool temperate to arctic regions of the Northern Hemisphere. One species, Polemonium micranthum, also occurs in the southern Andes in South America. Many of the species grow at high altitudes, in mountainous areas. Most of the uncertainty in the number of species relates to those in Eurasia, many of which have been synonymized with Polemonium caeruleum.

Polemonium are perennial plants (rarely annual plants) growing 10–120 cm tall with bright green leaves divided into lance-shaped leaflets. They produce blue (rarely white or pink) flowers in the spring and summer.

Some species are used as food plants by the larvae of some Lepidoptera species including Coleophora polemoniella.

== Species ==
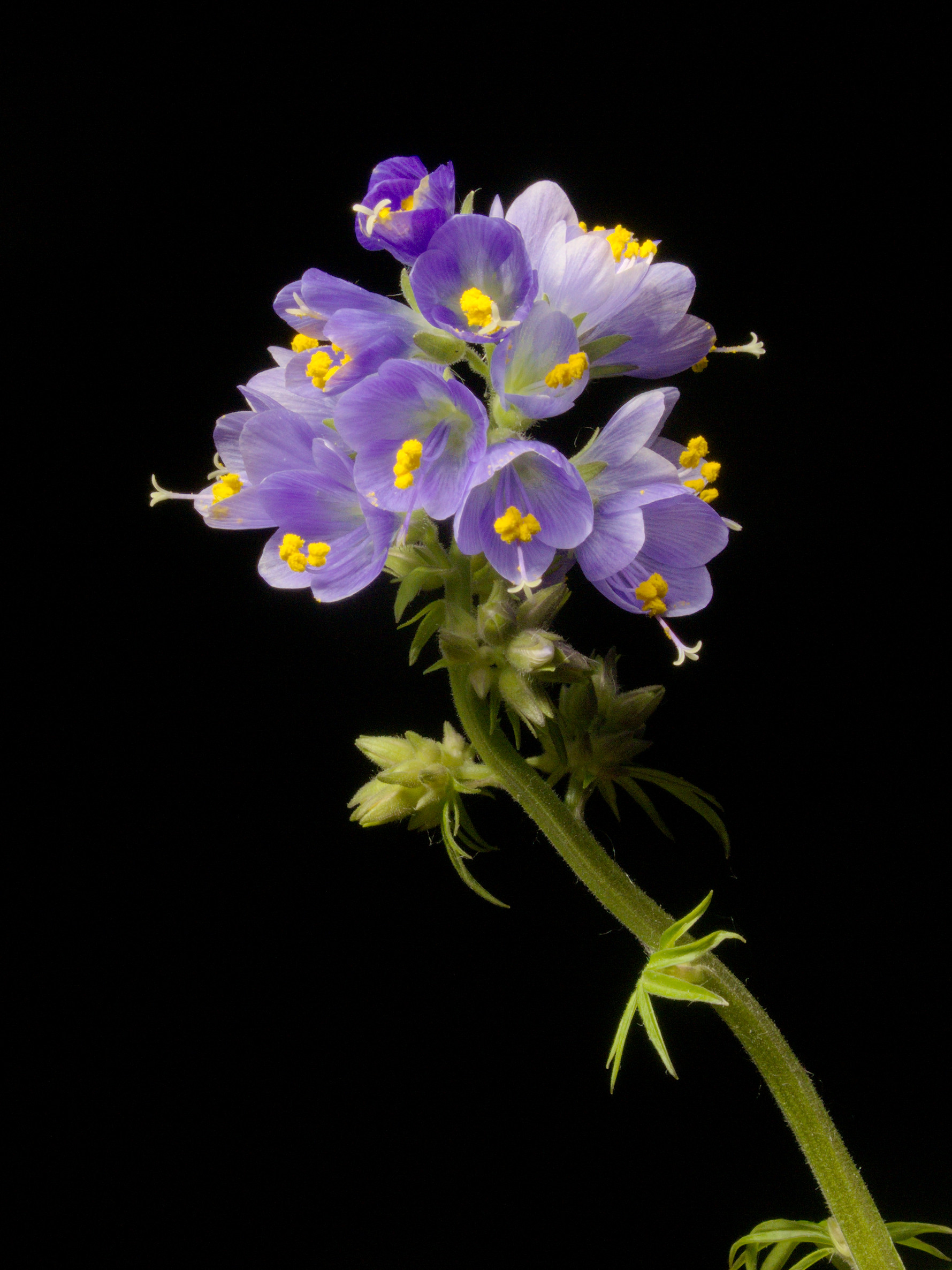
Polemonium caeruleum

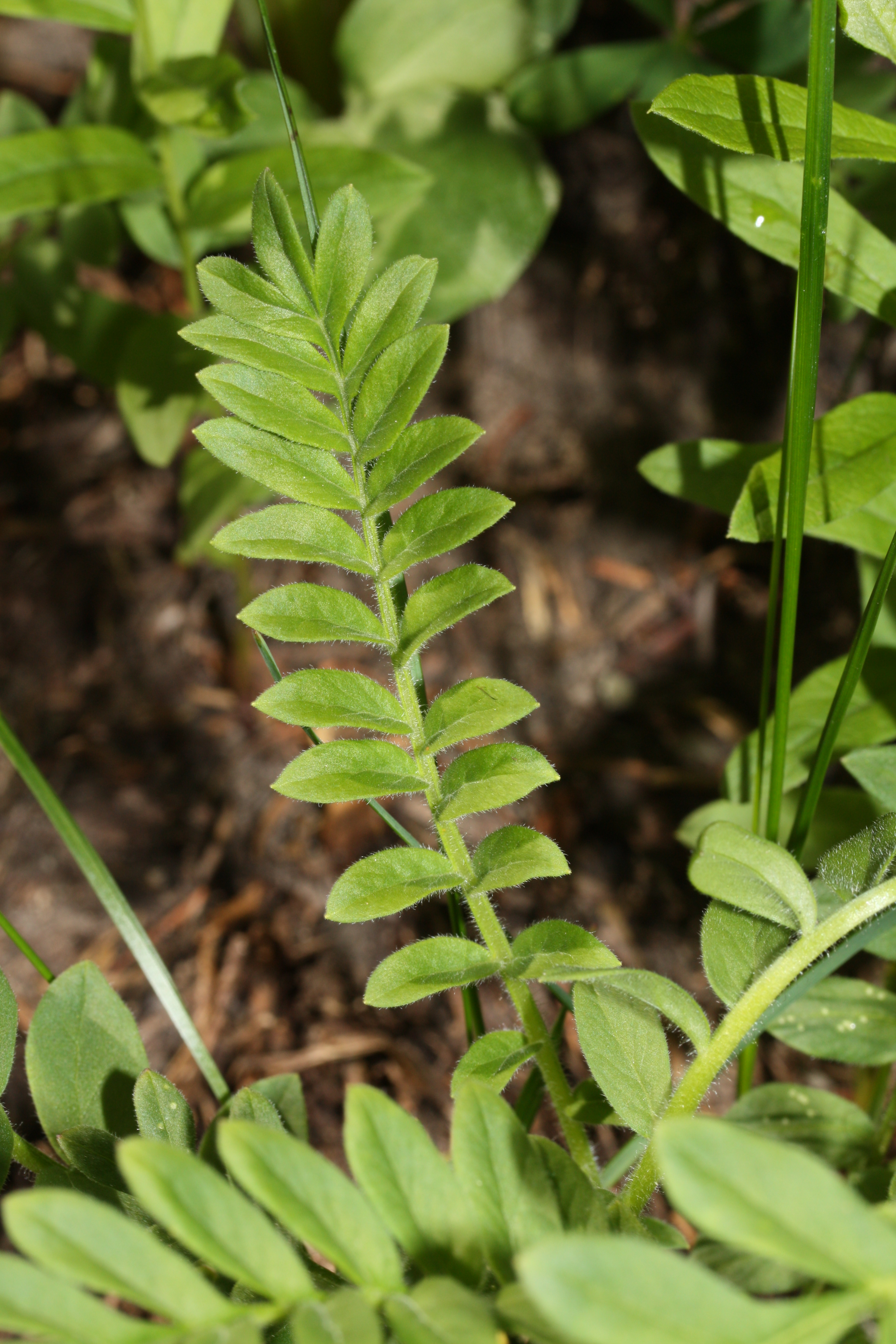
Polemonium californicum

As of April 2020 Kew's Plants of the World Online accepts 37 species. Many are locally known simply as "Jacob's ladder".

- Polemonium acutiflorum – tall Jacob's ladder
- Polemonium boreale Adams – northern Jacob's ladder
- Polemonium brandegeei (A.Gray) Greene – Brandegee's Jacob's ladder
- Polemonium caeruleum L. – Jacob's ladder (the original plant to bear this name); charity
- Polemonium californicum Eastw. – showy Jacob's ladder
- Polemonium campanulatum (Th.Fr.) Th.Fr.
- Polemonium carneum A.Gray – royal Jacob's ladder
- Polemonium caucasicum N.Busch
- Polemonium chartaceum H.Mason – Mason's Jacob's ladder
- Polemonium chinense (Brand) Brand
- Polemonium confertum – Rocky Mountain Jacob's ladder
- Polemonium eddyense Stubbs – Mount Eddy Jacob's-ladder
- Polemonium elegans Greene – elegant Jacob's ladder
- Polemonium elusum J.J.Irwin & R.L.Hartm. – elusive Jacob's-ladder
- Polemonium eximium Greene – sky pilot
- Polemonium foliosissimum A.Gray – towering Jacob's ladder
- Polemonium glabrum J.F.Davidson
- Polemonium grandiflorum Benth.
- Polemonium hingganicum (P.H.Huang & S.Y.Li) S.Y.Li & K.T.Adair
- Polemonium kiushianum Kitam.
- Polemonium majus Tolm.
- Polemonium mexicanum Cerv. ex Lag.
- Polemonium micranthum Benth. – annual polemonium
- Polemonium nevadense Wherry – Nevada Jacob's ladder
- Polemonium occidentale Greene – western Jacob's ladder
- Polemonium pauciflorum S.Watson – few-flower Jacob's ladder
- Polemonium pectinatum Greene – Washington Jacob's ladder
- Polemonium pulchellum Bunge
- Polemonium pulcherrimum Hook. – beautiful Jacob's ladder
- Polemonium reptans L. – Jacob's ladder, Greek valerian
- Polemonium sachalinense Vorosch.
- Polemonium schizanthum Klokov
- Polemonium schmidtii Klokov
- Polemonium × speciosum Rydb.
- Polemonium sumushanense G.H.Liu & Y.Q.Ma
- Polemonium vanbruntiae Britton – Vanbrunt's Jacob's ladder
- Polemonium × victoris Klokov
- Polemonium vilosissimum (Hultén) D.F.Murray & Elven
- Polemonium villosum Rudolph ex Georgi
- Polemonium viscosum Nutt. – sticky polemonium
- Polemonium yezoense (Miyabe & Kudô) Kitam.
