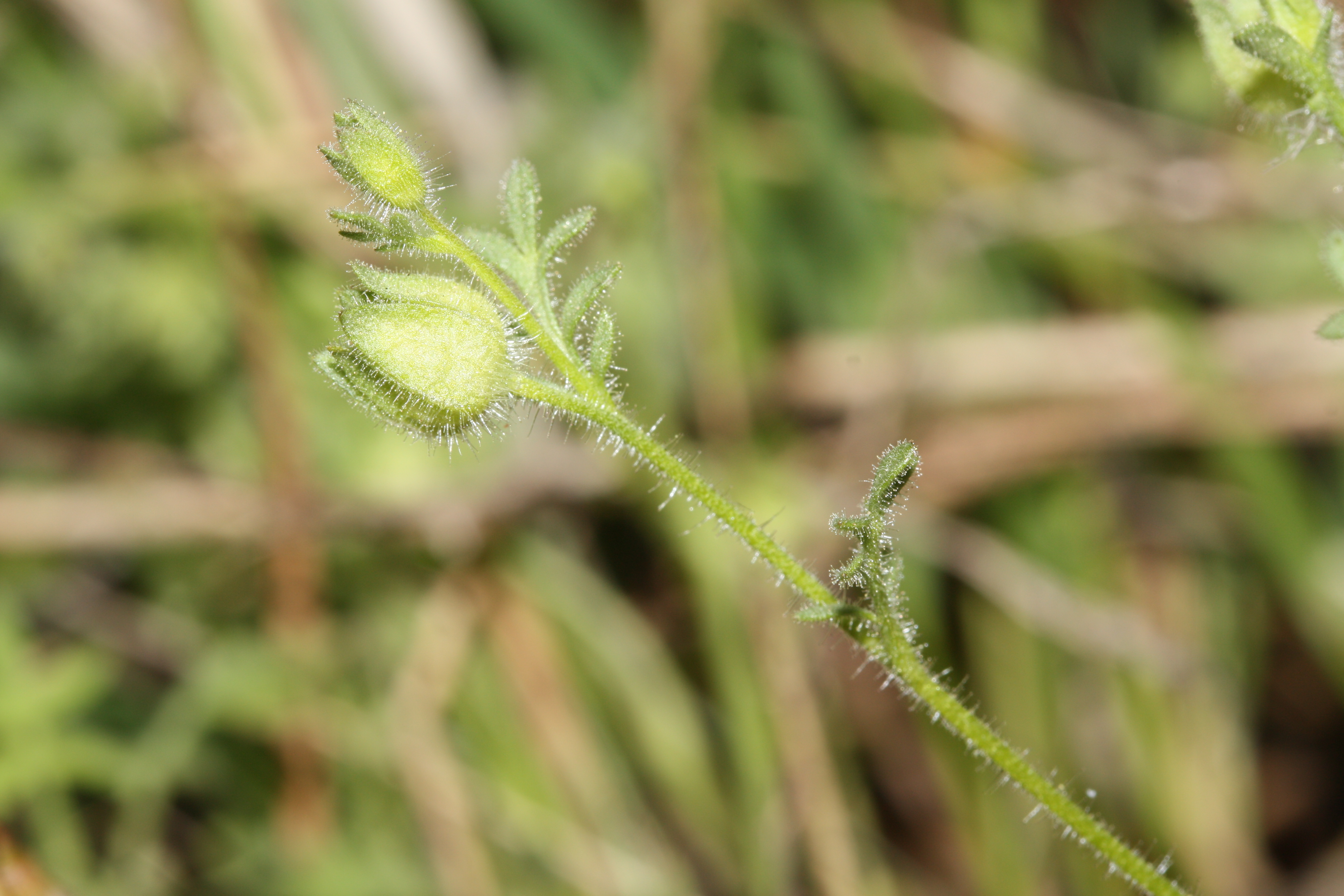

Conservation status
- Secure (NatureServe)

Scientific classification
- Kingdom: Plantae
- Clade: Embryophytes
- Clade: Tracheophytes
- Clade: Spermatophytes
- Clade: Angiosperms
- Clade: Eudicots
- Clade: Asterids
- Order: Ericales
- Family: Polemoniaceae
- Genus: Polemonium
- Species: P. micranthum

Binomial name
- Polemonium micranthum Benth.

= Polemonium micranthum =

Species of flowering plant

Polemonium micranthum is a species of flowering plant in the phlox family known by the common names annual polemonium or annual Jacob's-ladder. It is native to western North America from British Columbia to North Dakota to California as well as disjunct in the Andes of southern Argentina and Chile. It can be found in many types of shrubby habitat, such as sagebrush scrub and foothill woodlands. It is an annual herb with a branching or unbranched stem taking a matted, spreading, or upright form. The slender stems are up to about 30 centimeters long and the herbage is coated in short, soft hairs and stalked glands. The leaves are located along the stem, each divided into several small leaflets. The solitary flowers have small white or pale blue lobed corollas tucked within cuplike calyces of hairy, pointed sepals.
