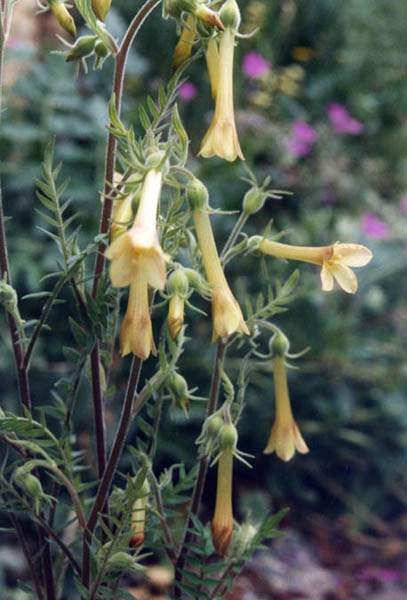

Conservation status
- Apparently Secure (NatureServe)

Scientific classification
- Kingdom: Plantae
- Clade: Embryophytes
- Clade: Tracheophytes
- Clade: Spermatophytes
- Clade: Angiosperms
- Clade: Eudicots
- Clade: Asterids
- Order: Ericales
- Family: Polemoniaceae
- Genus: Polemonium
- Species: P. pauciflorum

Binomial name
- Polemonium pauciflorum S.Watson 1888

= Polemonium pauciflorum =

Species of flowering plant

Polemonium pauciflorum, the fewflower Jacob's-ladder, is a rare species of flowering plant in the phlox family found in the United States and Mexico.
