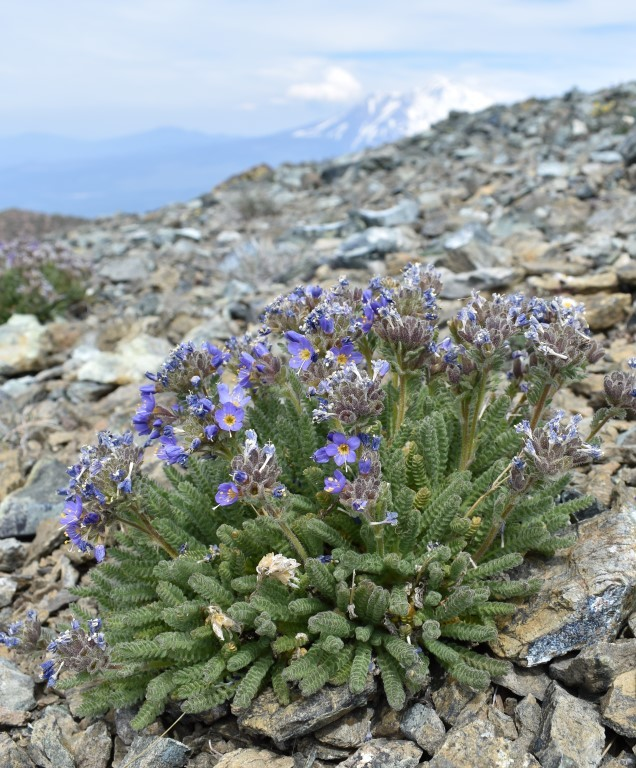

Conservation status
- Critically Imperiled (NatureServe)

Scientific classification
- Kingdom: Plantae
- Clade: Tracheophytes
- Clade: Angiosperms
- Clade: Eudicots
- Clade: Asterids
- Order: Ericales
- Family: Polemoniaceae
- Genus: Polemonium
- Species: P. eddyense

Binomial name
- Polemonium eddyense Stubbs

= Polemonium eddyense =

Species of plant

Polemonium eddyense is a perennial wildflower species in the family Polemoniaceae with the common name Mount Eddy sky pilot. It is endemic to a small area around Mount Eddy, California.

== Description ==
Polemonium eddyense is a small herb with a dense tuft of highly divided hairy leaves. The flowers are held in a tight cluster above the foliage and each flower has 5 symmetric petals and is blue with a yellow center and has prominent yellow anthers.

== Range and habitat ==
Polemonium eddyense is endangered and is found growing on and near Mount Eddy in California on rocky serpentine soils.
