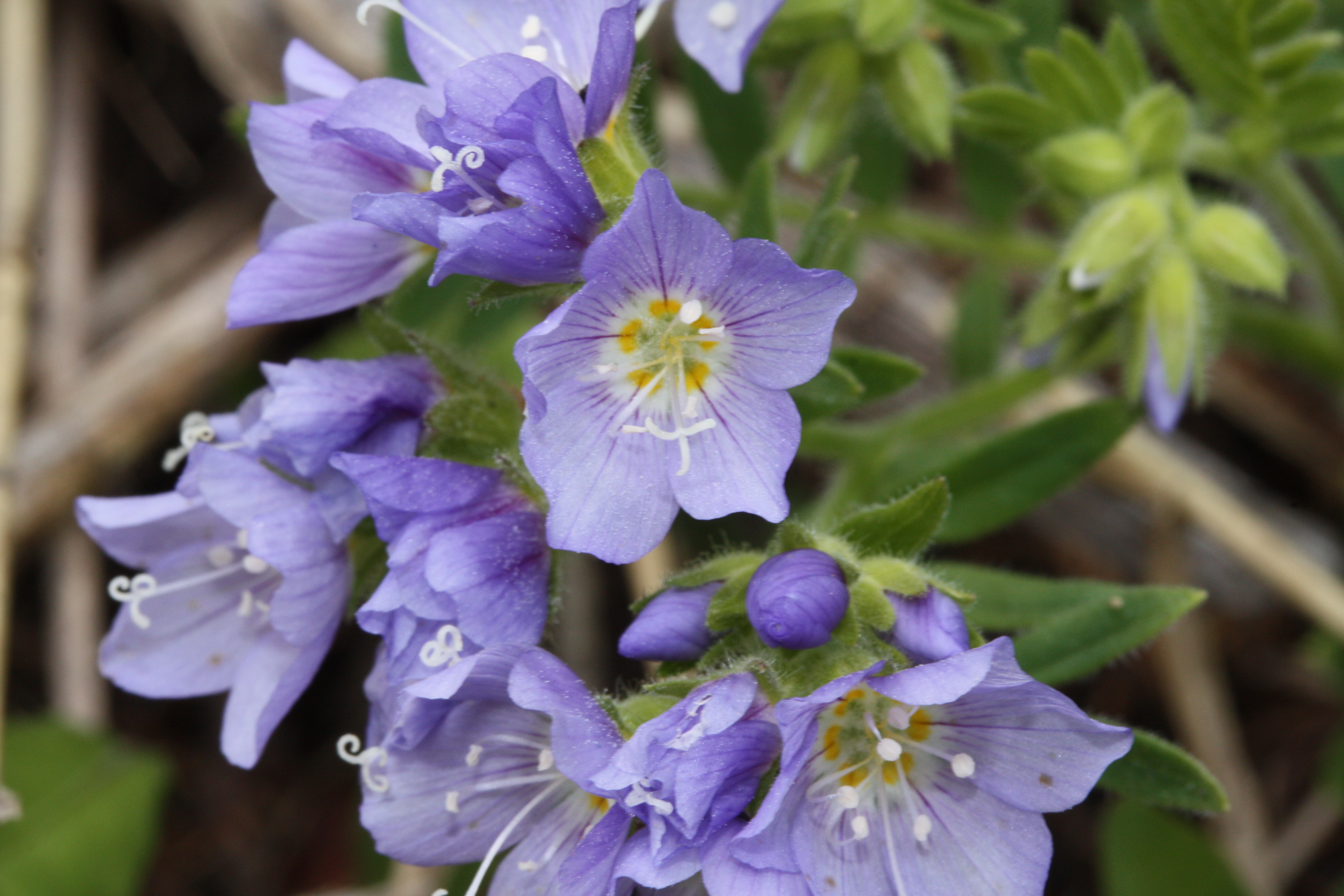

Conservation status
- Apparently Secure (NatureServe)

Scientific classification
- Kingdom: Plantae
- Clade: Embryophytes
- Clade: Tracheophytes
- Clade: Spermatophytes
- Clade: Angiosperms
- Clade: Eudicots
- Clade: Asterids
- Order: Ericales
- Family: Polemoniaceae
- Genus: Polemonium
- Species: P. californicum

Binomial name
- Polemonium californicum Eastw.

= Polemonium californicum =

Species of flowering plant

Polemonium californicum is a species of flowering plant in the phlox family known by the common names moving polemonium, low Jacob's-ladder, and California Jacob's ladder. It is native to the northwestern United States, where it grows in shady and moist habitat, such as mountain woodlands. It is a hairy, glandular rhizomatous perennial herb forming clumps of several decumbent to erect stems 30 to 50 centimetres (12 to 20 in) in maximum height. The leaves are up to 20 centimetres (7.9 in) long and are compound, made up of several pairs of oval to lance-shaped leaflets. The leaflet at the tip of the leaf is often fused to the pair behind it. The inflorescence is a crowded cluster of bell-shaped flowers each up to 1.5 centimetres (0.59 in) wide. The flower is blue or purple with a yellow center and a whitish tubular throat. The fruit is a capsule.
