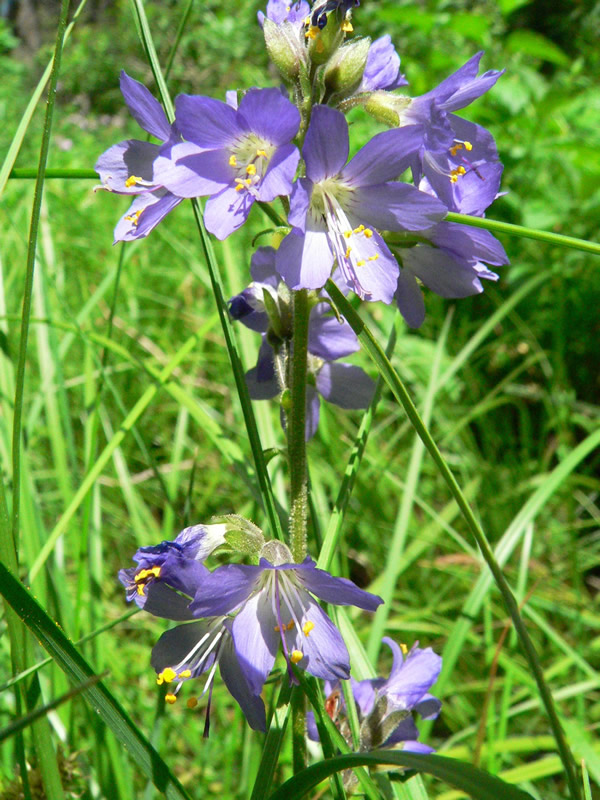

Conservation status
- Apparently Secure (NatureServe)

Scientific classification
- Kingdom: Plantae
- Clade: Embryophytes
- Clade: Tracheophytes
- Clade: Angiosperms
- Clade: Eudicots
- Clade: Asterids
- Order: Ericales
- Family: Polemoniaceae
- Genus: Polemonium
- Species: P. occidentale

Binomial name
- Polemonium occidentale Greene

Synonyms
- Polemonium helleri; Polemonium intermedium

= Polemonium occidentale =

Plant species in the phlox family

Polemonium occidentale is a species of flowering plant in the phlox family known by the common names western polemonium and western Jacob's-ladder. There are two subspecies. The common ssp. occidentale is native to western North America from British Columbia to Colorado to California, where it can be found in moist areas of many habitat types, including meadows and woodlands. There is also a rare subspecies, ssp. lacustre, which is known only from a total of three counties in Minnesota and Wisconsin, and is found only in white cedar swamp habitat there.

This is a rhizomatous perennial herb producing an erect stem up to one meter tall. The leaves are located along the stem, each divided into many small lance-shaped leaflets. The inflorescence is an open, elongated array of several bell-shaped, five-lobed flowers each up to 1.5 centimeters long. The flower corolla is blue to bright purple with a white throat.

== Taxonomy ==
Botanist Edward Lee Greene scientifically described Polemonium occidentale in 1890, placing it in the Polemonium genus. Along with its genus it is classified in the Polemoniaceae family. The rare species Polemonium lacustre was initially described as a subspecies of Polemonium occidentale, there are five populations that grow in swamps in Wisconsin and Minnesota. Although it has no accepted subspecies, it has one among its eleven synonyms and has also been described as a subspecies twice.

Table of Synonyms
Name	Year	Rank	Notes
Polemonium acutiflorum subsp. occidentale (Greene) Hultén	1948	subspecies	≡ hom.
Polemonium caeruleum subsp. amygdalinum (Wherry) Munz	1958	subspecies	= het.
Polemonium caeruleum var. foliosissimum A.Gray	1870	variety	= het.
Polemonium caeruleum subsp. occidentale (Greene) J.F.Davidson	1950	subspecies	≡ hom.
Polemonium caeruleum var. occidentale (Greene) H.St.John	1956	variety	≡ hom.
Polemonium caeruleum var. pterospermum Benth.	1845	variety	= het.
Polemonium helleri Brand	1907	species	= het.
Polemonium intermedium (Brand) Rydb.	1913	species	= het.
Polemonium occidentale subsp. amygdalinum Wherry	1942	subspecies	= het.
Polemonium occidentale var. intermedium Brand	1907	variety	= het.
Polemonium occidentale subsp. typicum Wherry	1942	subspecies	≡ hom., not validly publ.
Notes: ≡ homotypic synonym; = heterotypic synonym
