= Skypilot =

- Origin: Sunshine Coast, Queensland, Australia
- Genres: Pop rock, Indie rock, Rock, Pop, Alternative
- Years active: 2010–present
- Members: Jordan Grace; Trentan Kruger
- Website: www.skypilotband.com

Skypilot is an acoustic rock band from Queensland, Australia. Formed in 2010, the duo have released three EPs and a full-length album throughout their career and have toured the UK and Ireland on numerous occasions.

Consisting of members Jordan Grace and Trentan Kruger, Skypilot blend heavy acoustic guitars with brother-like harmonies appealing to crowds of all generations, and taking after influences like The Eagles, America and Simon and Garfunkel.

Skypilot supported American rock band Fireflight on their Stay Close Tour in April 2012, completing an East Coast tour of the United States.

In August 2012, Skypilot supported Grammy nominated artist Jeremy Camp on his first tour to Australia.

Skypilot recorded their latest album in Nashville, Tennessee. Distant Days was released in November 2013 with an album launch tour in California.

In 2014, Skypilot performed on the Main Stage at Forest Edge Music Festival alongside bands Evermore (band), New Empire (band), Five Mile Town and Michael Paynter and also completed a 30-town Australian Tour supporting Country/Gospel artist Steve Grace.

Skypilot are expected to release their first remix album in 2014.

== Discography ==
Albums

- Lighthouse (June 2011)
- Distant Days (November 2013)

EPs

- Live At The Island (October 2012)

Singles

- "Because of You" (April 2013)
