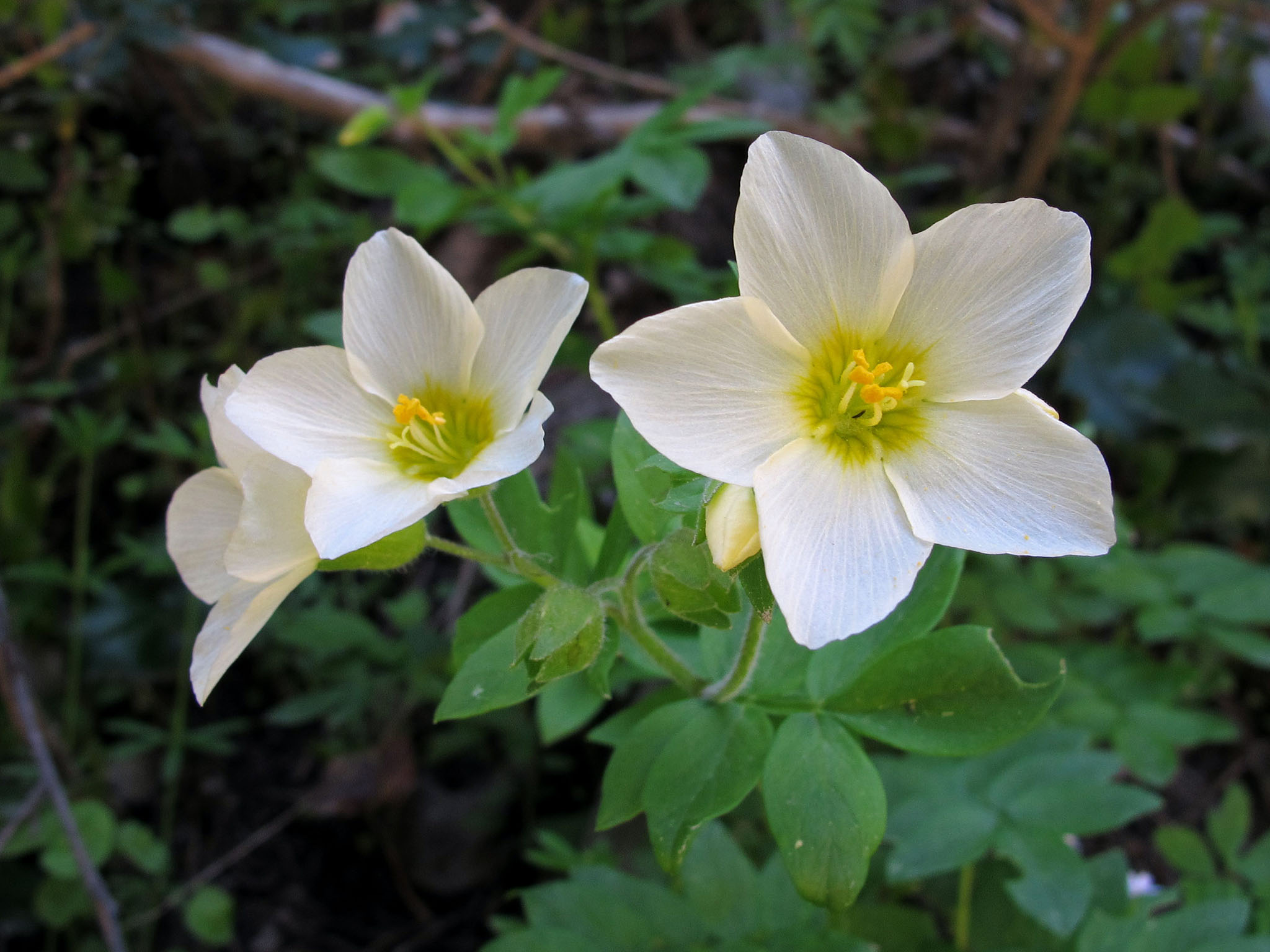
- Polemonium carneum in southern Oregon

Conservation status
- Vulnerable (NatureServe)

Scientific classification
- Kingdom: Plantae
- Clade: Embryophytes
- Clade: Tracheophytes
- Clade: Angiosperms
- Clade: Eudicots
- Clade: Asterids
- Order: Ericales
- Family: Polemoniaceae
- Genus: Polemonium
- Species: P. carneum

Binomial name
- Polemonium carneum A.Gray

= Polemonium carneum =

Species of flowering plant

Polemonium carneum is a plant native to the northwestern United States west of the crest of the Cascade Range, from Washington south through Oregon to the San Francisco Bay Area in California.

== Etymology ==
Common names include royal Jacob's-ladder, great polemonium, Oregon polemonium and salmon polemonium.

== Habitat ==
It grows in the lowlands and in prairies to moderate elevations in the mountains, and inhabits woody thickets, open and moist forests, prairie edges, and roadsides.

== Description ==
This is a rhizomatous perennial herb producing one or more stems decumbent in form or erect to a maximum height near one meter. The leaves are compound with up to 21 leaflets each. The sticky-haired leaflets are somewhat lance-shaped and up to 4 centimeters long. The inflorescence is an open, spreading cluster of 3 to 7 flowers each borne on a thin peduncle. The flower is widely bell-shaped with a five-lobed corolla that may spread to nearly 3 centimeters wide. The flower corolla may be any shade of pale pink, salmon pink, yellow, or pale lavender to medium purple.

The plant is sometimes grown in gardens as an ornamental.
