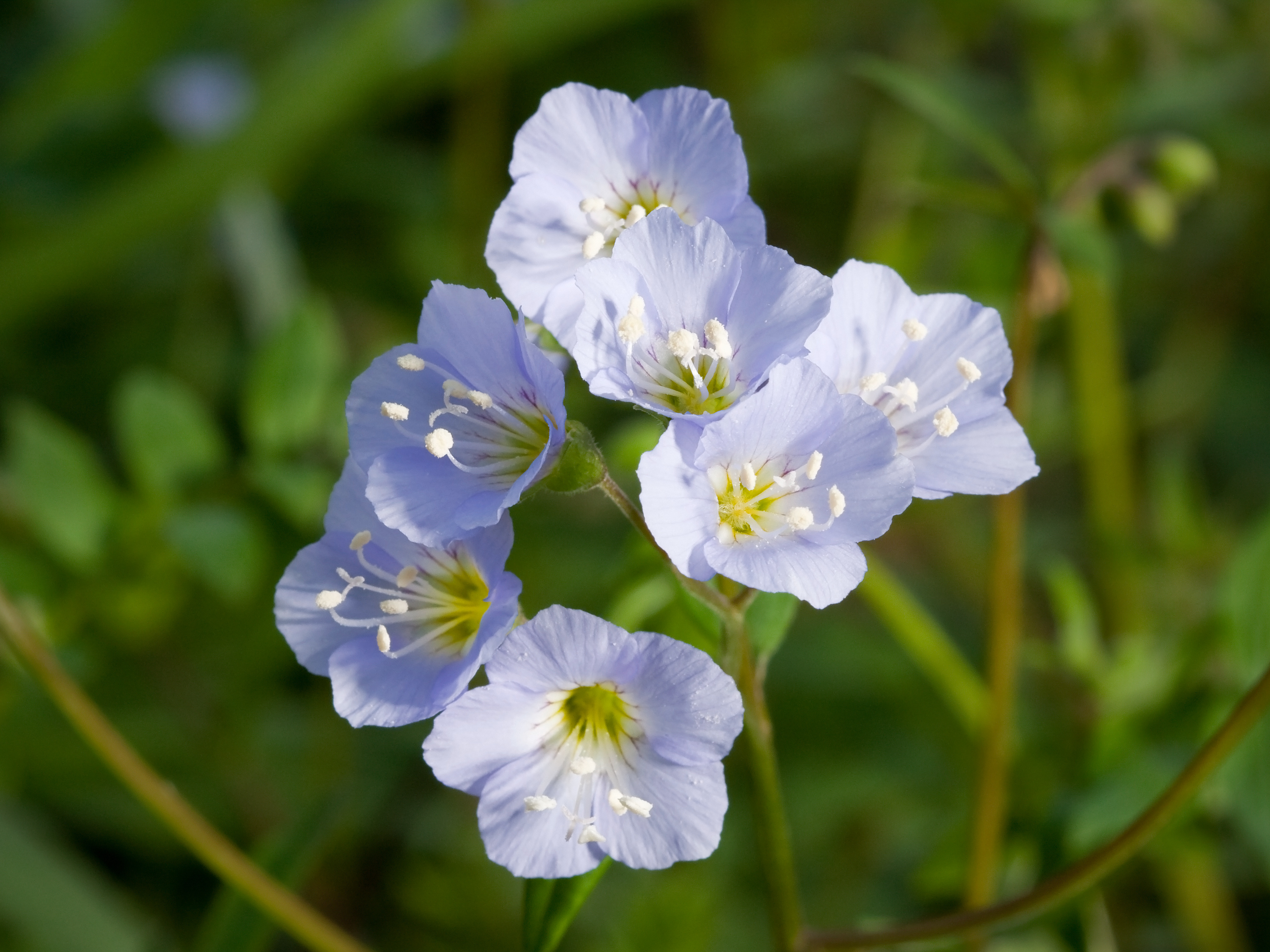
- Polemonium reptans flowers

Conservation status
- Secure (NatureServe)

Scientific classification
- Kingdom: Plantae
- Clade: Embryophytes
- Clade: Tracheophytes
- Clade: Spermatophytes
- Clade: Angiosperms
- Clade: Eudicots
- Clade: Asterids
- Order: Ericales
- Family: Polemoniaceae
- Genus: Polemonium
- Species: P. reptans

Binomial name
- Polemonium reptans L.

= Polemonium reptans =

Species of flowering plant

Polemonium reptans is a perennial herbaceous plant native to eastern North America. Common names include spreading Jacob's ladder, creeping Jacob's ladder, false Jacob's ladder, abscess root, American Greek valerian, blue bells, stairway to heaven, and sweatroot.

== Subtaxa ==
The following varieties are accepted:

- Polemonium reptans var. reptans
- Polemonium reptans var. villosum E.L. Braun - Kentucky, Ohio

== Description ==
Jacob's ladder grows 50 centimetres (20 in) tall, with pinnate leaves up to 20 centimetres (8 in) long with 5–13 leaflets. The leaves and flower stems grow from a vertical crown with abundant fibrous roots.

The flowers are produced in panicles on weak stems from mid to late spring. They are 1.3 cm (1/2 in) long and have five light blue-violet petals that are fused at the base, enclosed by a tubular calyx with five pointed lobes. The pollen is white. The stigma extends beyond the anthers, making self-pollination difficult, so insects must cross-pollinate for the plants to produce seed.

Pollinated flowers develop into an oval pod with three chambers, 6 mm (1/4 in) long, which is enclosed by the green calyx. The plant spreads by reseeding itself. The Latin specific epithet reptans means creeping.

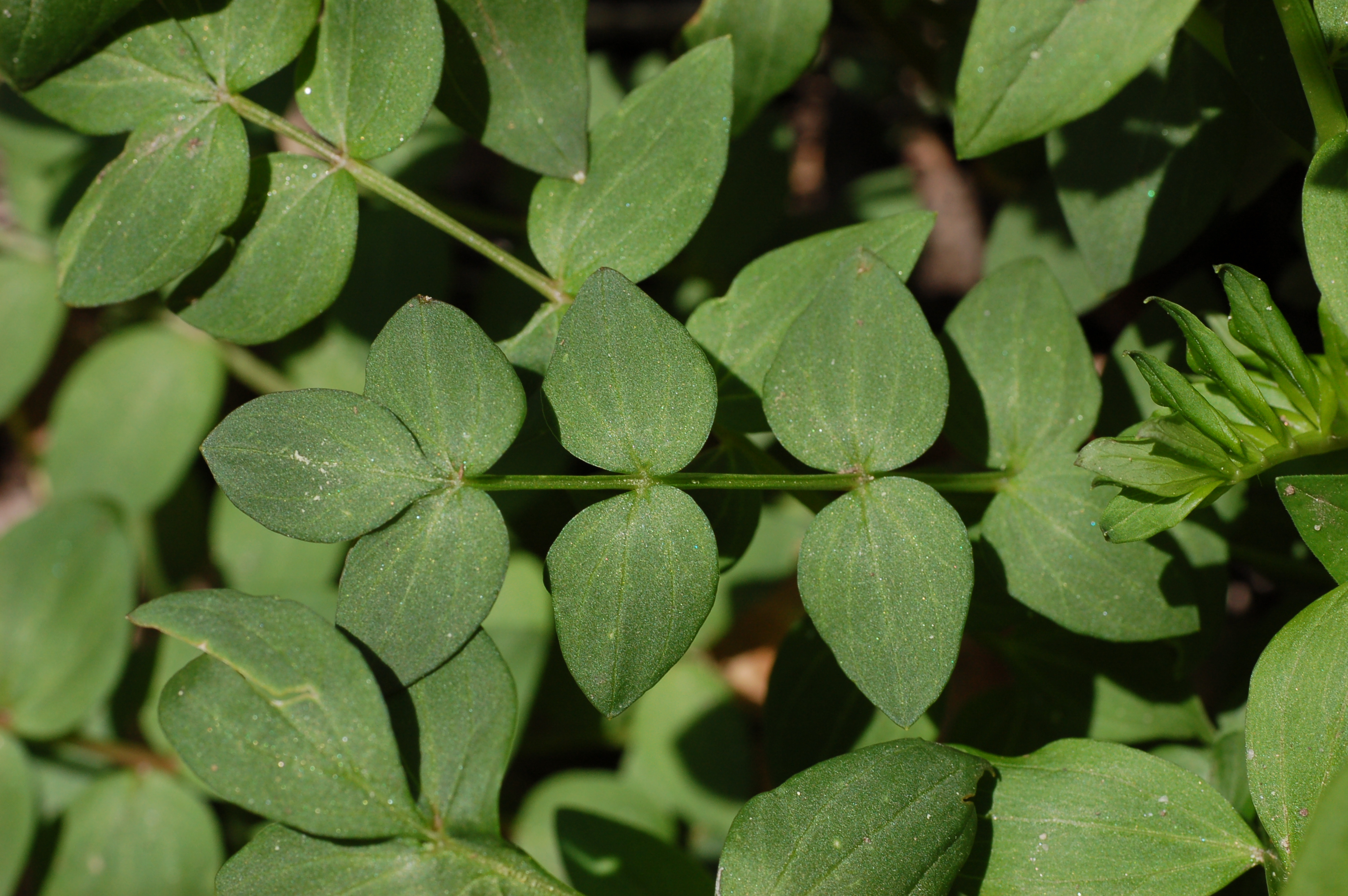
Leaves

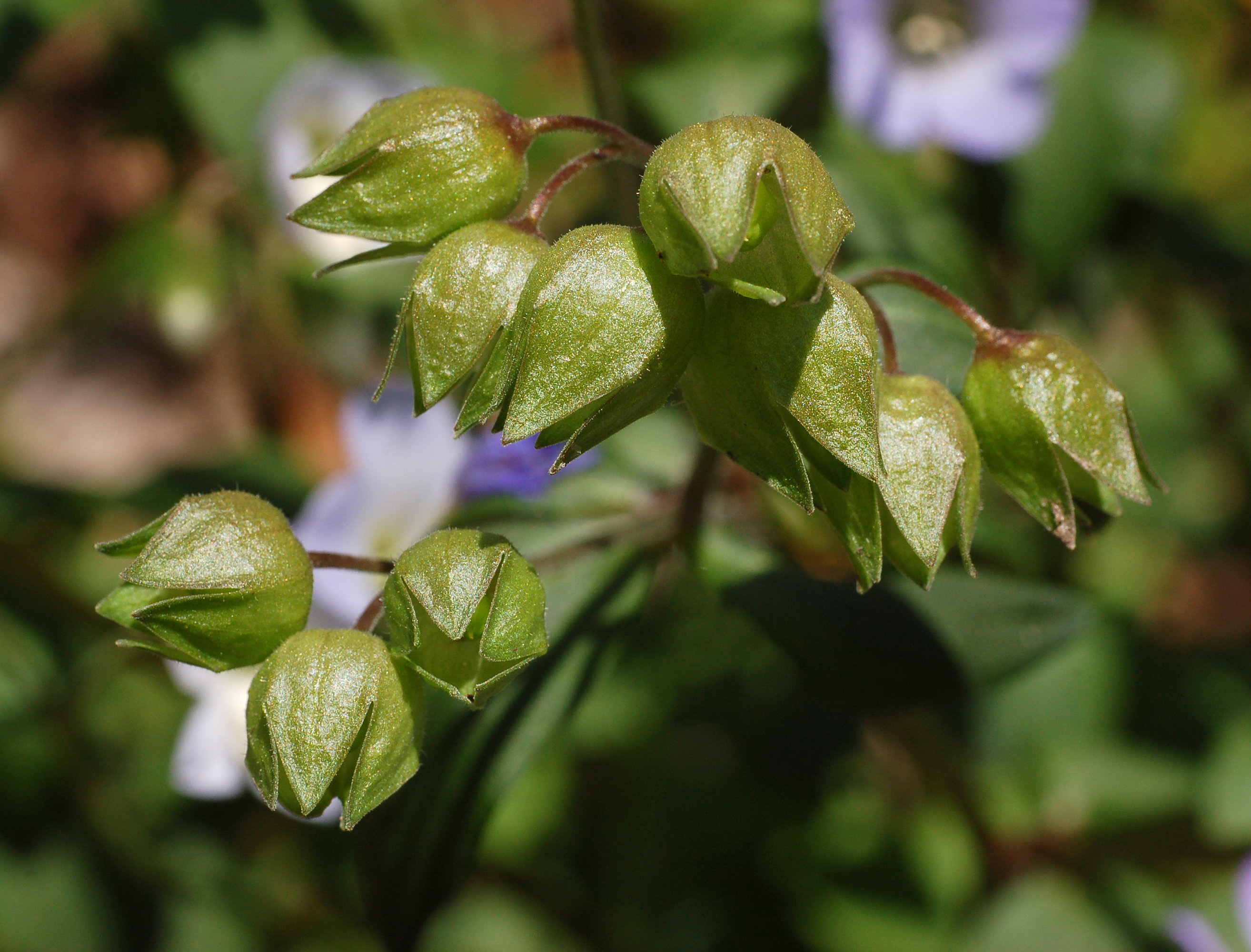
Oval seed pods enclosed in green calyces

== Ecology ==
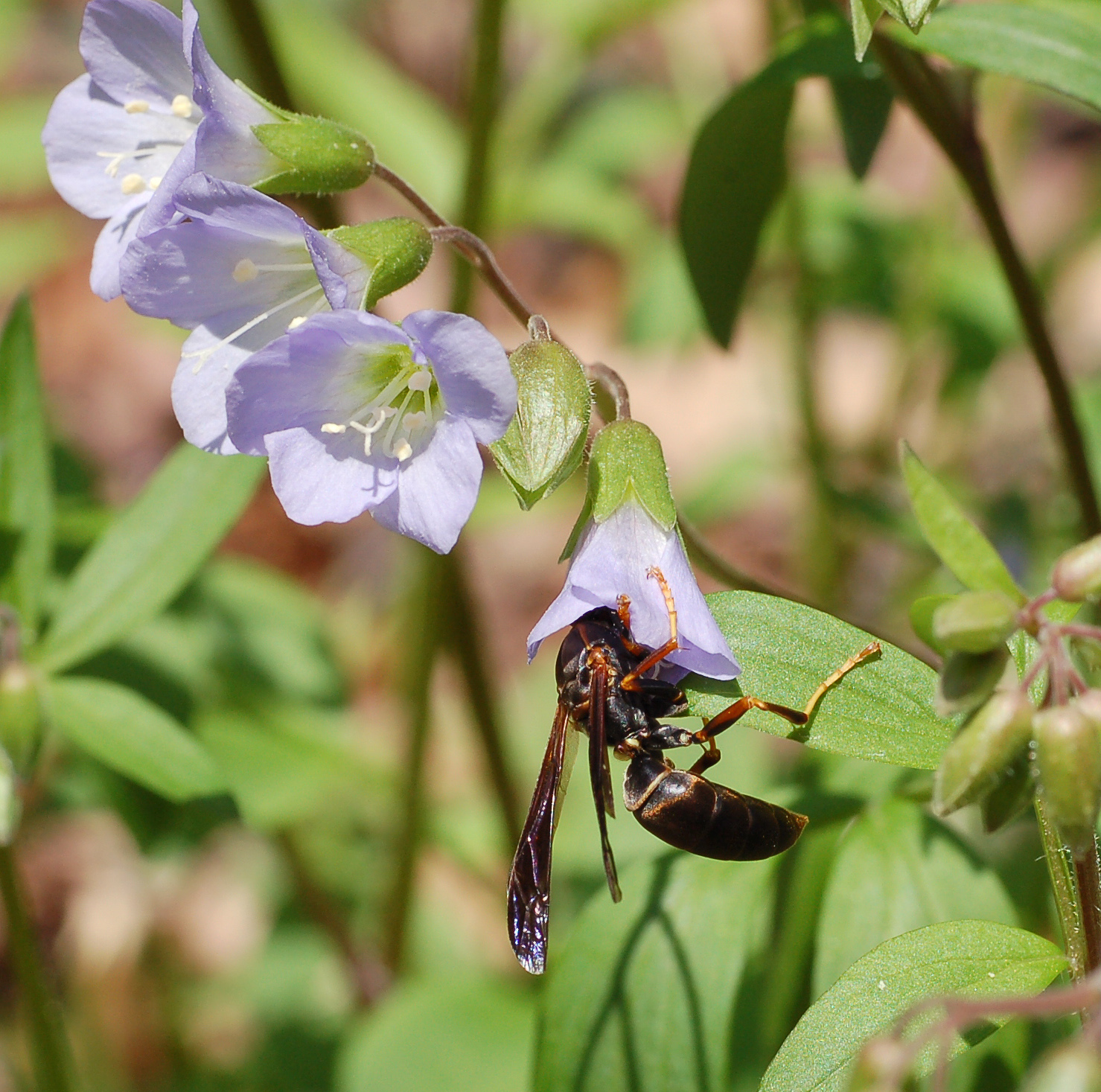
Flowers being visited by a wasp

The flowers produce both pollen and nectar. Long- and short-tongued bees visit the plants for both nectar and pollen, syrphid flies and fire beetles (Pedilus lugubris) feed on pollen, and butterflies and moths drink nectar. Out of these insects, large bees are the most effective at cross-pollination, since they most often touch the pollen-covered anthers.

== Range and habitat ==
Polemonium reptans is typically found in rich, moist woods, often along streambanks. Its range extends from Minnesota to New Hampshire in the north, and from Georgia to Mississippi in the south. It is most abundant west of the Appalachian Mountains.

== Cultivation ==
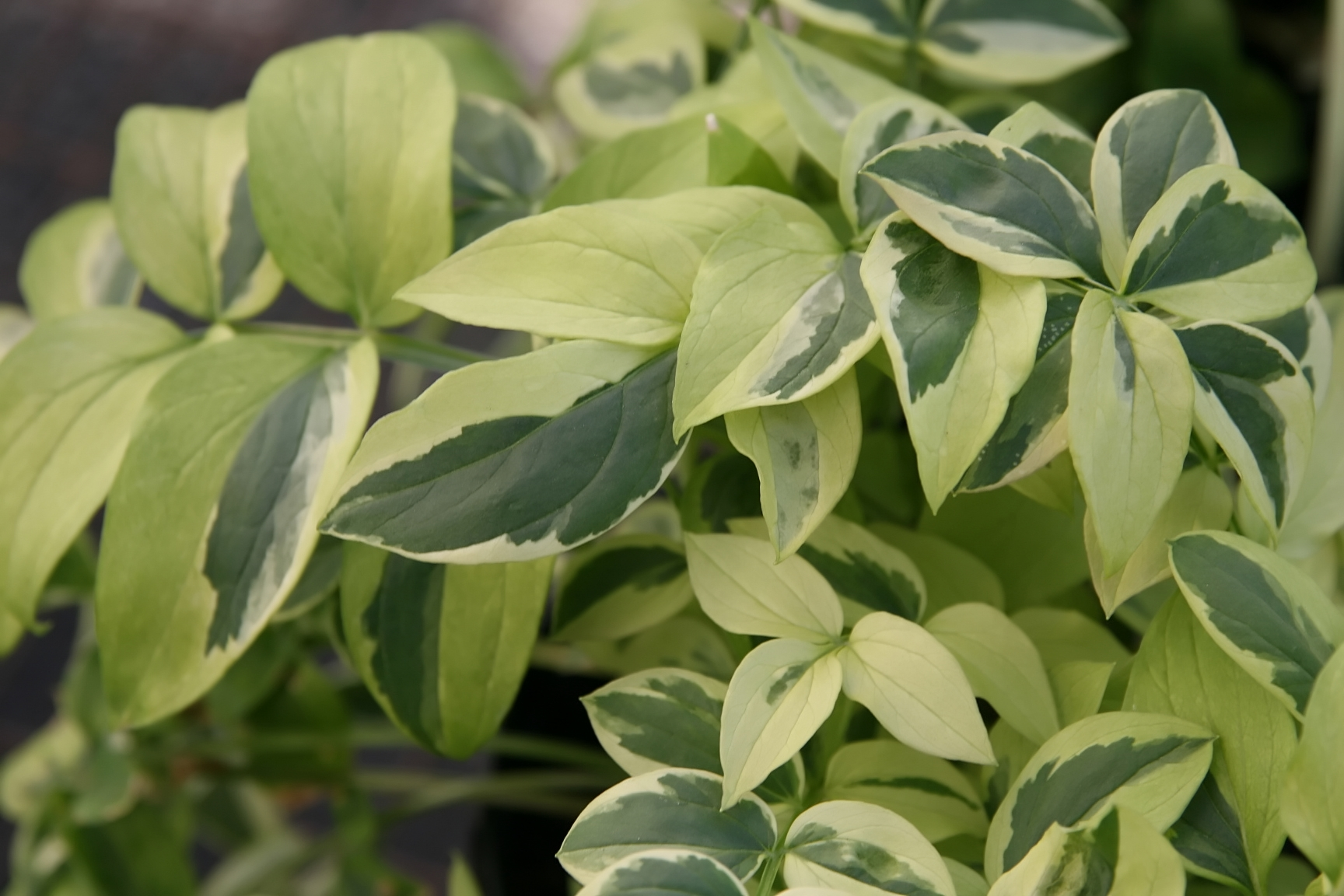
The variegated cultivar 'Stairway to Heaven'

The plant prefers partial shade and mesic soil. It tolerates full sun, but requires constantly moist soil.

== Uses ==
The dried roots have a slightly bitter and acrid taste. P. reptans has been traditionally used as an herbal medicine for febrile and inflammatory diseases, to ease coughs, colds and bronchial complaints, and to encourage perspiration. It is furthermore said to bring relief in cases of inflammations and infections. The root is rarely used in modern herbalism. It is harvested in the autumn and dried for later use.
