= Sky Pilot Mountain (Montana) =

Mountain in Montana, United States

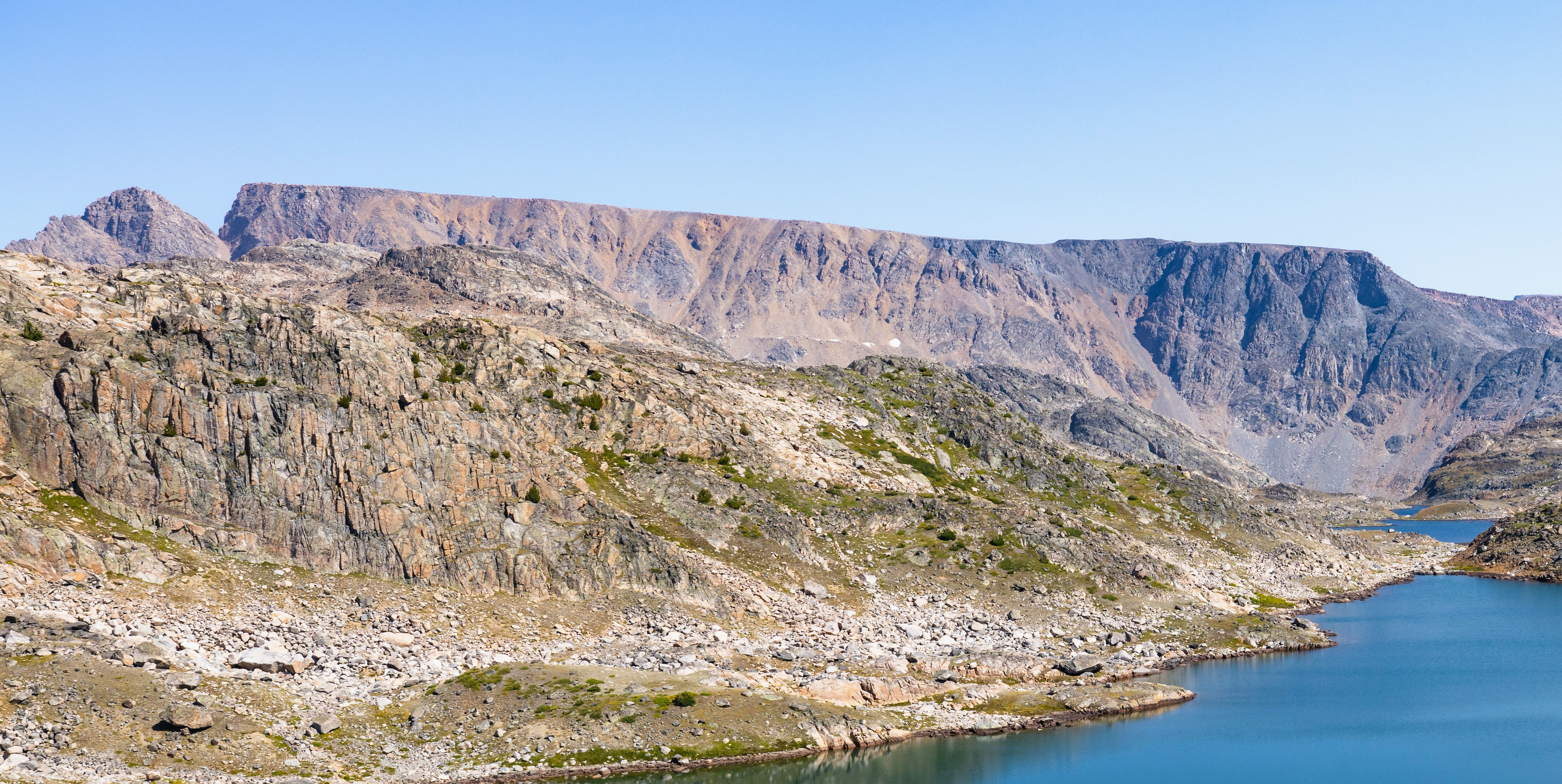
- West aspect

Highest point
- Elevation: 12,052 ft (3,673 m)
- Prominence: 567 ft (173 m)
- Coordinates: 45°04′44″N 109°37′02″W

Geography
- Location within Montana Location within the United States
- Location: Carbon County, Montana, U.S.
- Parent range: Beartooth Mountains
- Topo map: USGS Silver Run Peak

Sky Pilot Mountain (12,052 feet (3,673 m)) is in the Beartooth Mountains in the U.S. state of Montana. The peak is in the Absaroka-Beartooth Wilderness on the borders of Custer and Gallatin National Forests. The Hopper Glacier lies on the east flank of the peak.
