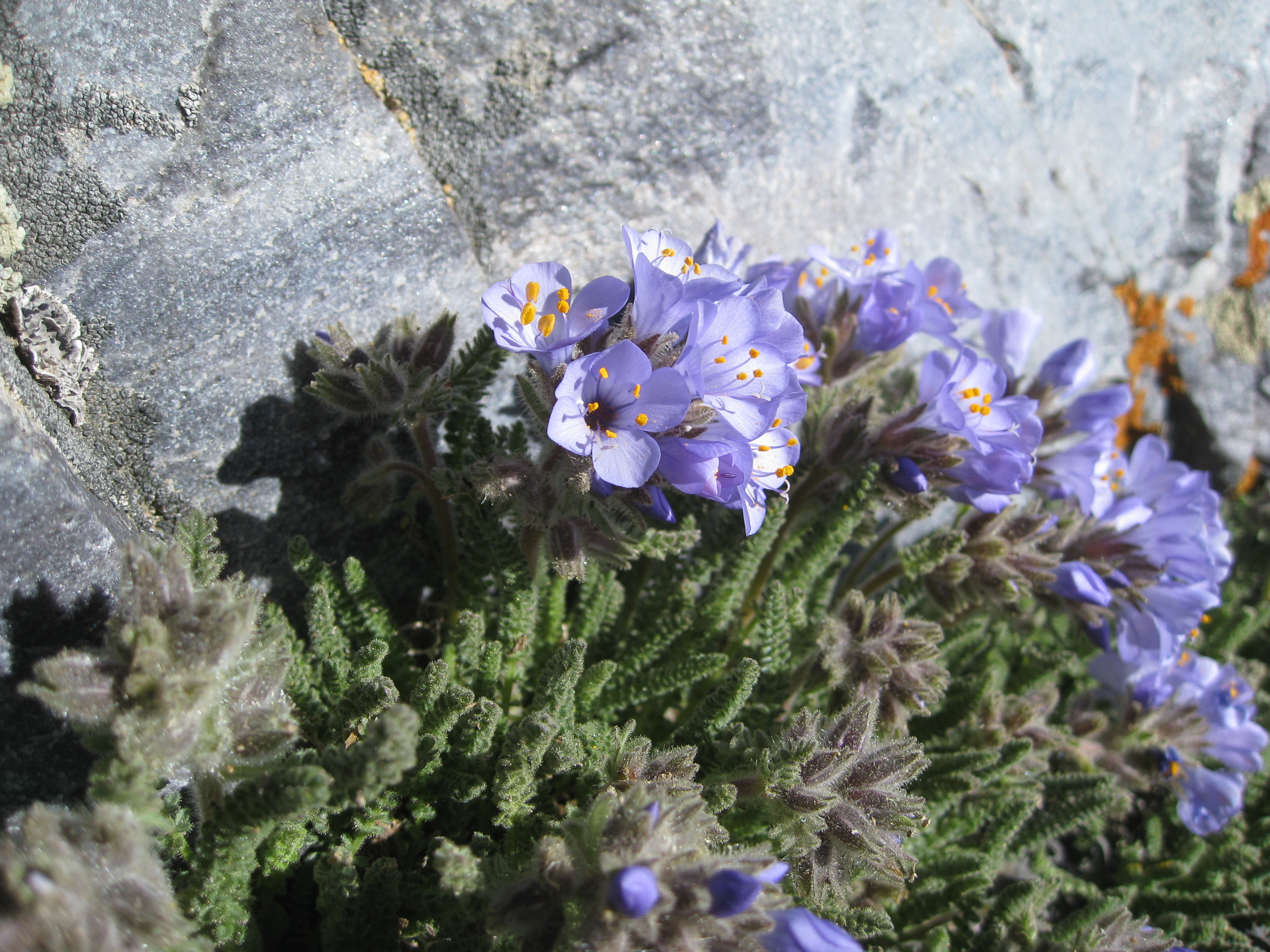

Conservation status
- Least Concern (IUCN 3.1)

- Secure (NatureServe)

Scientific classification
- Kingdom: Plantae
- Clade: Embryophytes
- Clade: Tracheophytes
- Clade: Angiosperms
- Clade: Eudicots
- Clade: Asterids
- Order: Ericales
- Family: Polemoniaceae
- Genus: Polemonium
- Species: P. viscosum

Binomial name
- Polemonium viscosum Nutt.

Synonyms
- Polemonium lemmonii

= Polemonium viscosum =

Plant species in the phlox family

Polemonium viscosum, known as sky pilot, skunkweed, sticky Jacobs-ladder, and sticky polemonium, is a flowering plant in the genus Polemonium native to western North America from southern British Columbia east to Montana and south to Arizona and New Mexico, where it grows at high altitudes on dry, rocky sites.

It is a perennial herbaceous plant growing 10–30 cm (3.9–11.8 in) tall, with pinnate leaves up to 15 cm (5.9 in) long with numerous small spoon-shaped leaflets 1.5–6 mm long and 1–3 mm broad. It has purple flowers 17–25 mm (0.67–0.98 in) long.

It is grown as an ornamental plant in rock gardens.

== Taxonomy ==
Polemonium viscosum was given its scientific name in 1848 by Thomas Nuttall. It is classified in the genus Polemonium as part of the Polemoniaceae family. The species has no accepted subspecies, but has two among its four synonyms.

Table of Synonyms
Name	Year	Rank	Notes
Polemonium lemmonii Brand	1907	species	= het.
Polemonium viscosum subsp. genuinum Wherry	1942	subspecies	≡ hom., not validly publ.
Polemonium viscosum subsp. lemmonii (Brand) Wherry	1942	subspecies	= het.
Polemonium viscosum f. leucanthum L.O.Williams	1934	form	= het.
Notes: ≡ homotypic synonym; = heterotypic synonym
