= List of Canadian plants by family P–Q =

Main page: List of Canadian plants by family

The following families of vascular plants are listed as occurring in Canada:

For mosses of Canada, see:

== Paeoniaceae ==
- Paeonia brownii — western peony

== Pallaviciniaceae ==
- Moerckia blyttii
- Moerckia hibernica
- Pallavicinia lyellii — pallavicinia

== Papaveraceae ==
- Meconella oregana — white meconella
- Papaver alboroseum — pale poppy
- Papaver alpinum — dwarf poppy
- Papaver dahlianum — polar poppy
- Papaver gorodkovii — Russian poppy
- Papaver lapponicum — Lapland poppy
- Papaver macounii — Macoun's poppy
- Papaver mcconnellii — McConnell's poppy
- Papaver nudicaule — Icelandic poppy
- Papaver pygmaeum — alpine glacier poppy
- Papaver radicatum — Arctic poppy
- Papaver walpolei — Walpole's poppy
- Sanguinaria canadensis — bloodroot
- Stylophorum diphyllum — celandine poppy

== Pelliaceae ==
- Pellia endiviifolia
- Pellia epiphylla — common pellia
- Pellia neesiana

== Phytolaccaceae ==
- Phytolacca americana — common pokeweed

== Pinaceae ==
- Abies amabilis — Pacific silver fir
- Abies balsamea — balsam fir
- Abies grandis — grand fir
- Abies lasiocarpa — subalpine fir
- Abies x phanerolepis
- Larix laricina — tamarack
- Larix lyallii — subalpine larch
- Larix occidentalis — western larch
- Picea engelmannii — Engelmann's spruce
- Picea glauca — white spruce
- Picea mariana — black spruce
- Picea rubens — red spruce
- Picea sitchensis — Sitka spruce
- Picea x lutzii
- Pinus albicaulis — whitebark pine
- Pinus banksiana — jack pine
- Pinus contorta — lodgepole pine
- Pinus flexilis — limber pine
- Pinus monticola — western white pine
- Pinus ponderosa — ponderosa pine
- Pinus resinosa — red pine
- Pinus rigida — pitch pine
- Pinus strobus — eastern white pine
- Pinus x murraybanksiana
- Pseudotsuga menziesii — Douglas-fir
- Tsuga canadensis — eastern hemlock
- Tsuga heterophylla — western hemlock
- Tsuga mertensiana — mountain hemlock

== Plagiochilaceae ==
- Pedinophyllum interruptum
- Plagiochila arctica
- Plagiochila asplenioides
- Plagiochila austinii
- Plagiochila porelloides
- Plagiochila satoi
- Plagiochila schoefieldiana
- Plagiochila semidecurrens

== Plagiotheciaceae ==
- Plagiothecium berggrenianum
- Plagiothecium cavifolium
- Plagiothecium denticulatum
- Plagiothecium laetum
- Plagiothecium latebricola — lurking leskea
- Plagiothecium piliferum
- Plagiothecium undulatum

== Plantaginaceae ==
- Littorella uniflora — American shoregrass
- Plantago bigelovii — Bigelow's plantain
- Plantago canescens — hairy plantain
- Plantago cordata — heartleaf plantain
- Plantago elongata — slender plantain
- Plantago eriopoda — saline plantain
- Plantago macrocarpa — Alaska plantain
- Plantago maritima — seaside plantain
- Plantago patagonica — woolly plantain
- Plantago rugelii — blackseed plantain
- Plantago tweedyi — Tweedy's plantain

== Pleuroziaceae ==
- Pleurozia purpurea

== Pleuroziopsidaceae ==
- Pleuroziopsis ruthenica

== Plumbaginaceae ==
- Armeria maritima — western thrift
- Limonium carolinianum — sea-lavender

== Poaceae ==
- Achnatherum hymenoides — Indian mountain-ricegrass
- Achnatherum lemmonii — Lemmon's needlegrass
- Achnatherum nelsonii — Nelson's needlegrass
- Achnatherum occidentale — western needlegrass
- Achnatherum richardsonii — Canada mountain-ricegrass
- Agrostis aequivalvis — northern bentgrass
- Agrostis alascana — Alaska bentgrass
- Agrostis clavata — clubbed bentgrass
- Agrostis diegoensis — leafy bentgrass
- Agrostis exarata — spike bentgrass
- Agrostis geminata — hairgrass
- Agrostis humilis — mountain bentgrass
- Agrostis hyemalis — winter bentgrass
- Agrostis idahoensis — Idaho bentgrass
- Agrostis mertensii — Arctic bentgrass
- Agrostis microphylla — small-leaf bentgrass
- Agrostis oregonensis — Oregon bentgrass
- Agrostis pallens — seashore bentgrass
- Agrostis perennans — perennial bentgrass
- Agrostis scabra — rough bentgrass
- Agrostis stolonifera — creeping bentgrass
- Agrostis thurberiana — Thurber's bentgrass
- Agrostis variabilis — variable bentgrass
- Alopecurus aequalis — shortawn foxtail
- Alopecurus alpinus — mountain foxtail
- Alopecurus carolinianus — tufted foxtail
- Ammophila breviligulata — American beachgrass
- Andropogon gerardi — big bluestem
- Andropogon hallii — sand bluestem
- Andropogon virginicus — common broom-sedge
- Arctagrostis latifolia — broadleaf arctagrostis
- Arctophila fulva — pendant-grass
- Aristida basiramea — forked three-awn grass
- Aristida dichotoma — Shinner's three-awn grass
- Aristida longespica — slimspike three-awn grass
- Aristida purpurascens — purple needlegrass
- Aristida purpurea — purple three-awn grass
- Beckmannia syzigachne — American sloughgrass
- Bouteloua curtipendula — side-oats gramma
- Bouteloua gracilis — blue gramma
- Bouteloua hirsuta — hairy gramma
- Brachyelytrum erectum — bearded shorthusk
- Brachyelytrum septentrionale — northern shorthusk
- Bromus anomalus — nodding brome
- Bromus carinatus — California brome
- Bromus ciliatus — fringed brome
- Bromus inermis — awnless brome
- Bromus kalmii — wild chess
- Bromus latiglumis — broad-glumed brome
- Bromus nottowayanus — Nottoway brome
- Bromus pacificus — Pacific brome
- Bromus porteri — Porter's chess
- Bromus pubescens — hairy wood brome
- Bromus sitchensis — Alaska brome
- Bromus vulgaris — narrow-flowered brome
- Buchloe dactyloides — buffalo grass
- Calamagrostis canadensis — bluejoint reedgrass
- Calamagrostis coarctata — Nuttall's reedgrass
- Calamagrostis deschampsioides — circumpolar small-reedgrass
- Calamagrostis holmii — Holm's small-reedgrass
- Calamagrostis lapponica — Lapland reedgrass
- Calamagrostis montanensis — plains reedgrass
- Calamagrostis nutkaensis — Pacific small-reedgrass
- Calamagrostis pickeringii — Pickering's reed bentgrass
- Calamagrostis purpurascens — purple reedgrass
- Calamagrostis rubescens — pine reedgrass
- Calamagrostis sesquiflora — one-and-a-half-flower small-reedgrass
- Calamagrostis stricta — slimstem small-reedgrass
- Calamovilfa longifolia — sand reedgrass
- Catabrosa aquatica — brook grass
- Cenchrus longispinus — longspine sandbur
- Chasmanthium latifolium — Indian sea-oats
- Cinna arundinacea — stout wood reedgrass
- Cinna latifolia — slender wood reedgrass
- Coleanthus subtilis — moss grass
- Danthonia californica — California oatgrass
- Danthonia compressa — flattened oatgrass
- Danthonia intermedia — Vasey's oatgrass
- Danthonia parryi — Parry's oatgrass
- Danthonia spicata — poverty oatgrass
- Danthonia unispicata — few-flowered oatgrass
- Deschampsia alpina — alpine hairgrass
- Deschampsia beringensis — Bering hairgrass
- Deschampsia brevifolia — shortleaf hairgrass
- Deschampsia caespitosa — tufted hairgrass
- Deschampsia danthonioides — annual hairgrass
- Deschampsia elongata — slender hairgrass
- Deschampsia flexuosa — wavy hairgrass
- Deschampsia holciformis — Pacific hairgrass
- Deschampsia mackenzieana — MacKenzie's hairgrass
- Diarrhena americana — American beakgrain
- Diarrhena obovata — beak grass
- Dichanthelium acuminatum — tapered rosette grass
- Dichanthelium boreale — northern witchgrass
- Dichanthelium boscii — Bosc's witchgrass
- Dichanthelium clandestinum — deer-tongue witchgrass
- Dichanthelium depauperatum — starved witchgrass
- Dichanthelium dichotomum — cypress witchgrass
- Dichanthelium latifolium — broadleaf witchgrass
- Dichanthelium leibergii — Leiberg's rosette grass
- Dichanthelium leucothrix — roughish witchgrass
- Dichanthelium linearifolium — slimleaf witchgrass
- Dichanthelium longiligulatum — coastal plain witchgrass
- Dichanthelium meridionale — matting witchgrass
- Dichanthelium oligosanthes — Heller's witchgrass
- Dichanthelium ovale — egg-leaf witchgrass
- Dichanthelium sabulorum — hemlock witchgrass
- Dichanthelium scabriusculum — woolly witchgrass
- Dichanthelium sphaerocarpon — roundfruit panicgrass
- Dichanthelium spretum — Eaton's witchgrass
- Dichanthelium villosissimum — whitehair witchgrass
- Dichanthelium wilcoxianum — Wilcox' panicgrass
- Dichanthelium xanthophysum — slender dichanthelium
- Digitaria cognata — mountain hairgrass
- Distichlis spicata — seashore saltgrass
- Dupontia fisheri — Fisher's dupontia
- Echinochloa muricata — rough barnyard grass
- Echinochloa walteri — Walter's barnyard grass
- Elymus alaskanus — Alaska wild rye
- Elymus albicans — Montana wild rye
- Elymus calderi — Calder's wild rye
- Elymus canadensis — nodding wild rye
- Elymus diversiglumis — interrupted wild rye
- Elymus elymoides — bottlebrush squirrel-tail
- Elymus glaucus — smooth wild rye
- Elymus hirsutus — boreal wild rye
- Elymus hystrix — bottlebrush grass
- Elymus lanceolatus — streamside wild rye
- Elymus macrourus — thickspike wild rye
- Elymus riparius — river wild rye
- Elymus scribneri — Scribner's wild rye
- Elymus sibiricus — Siberian wild rye
- Elymus submuticus — wild rye
- Elymus trachycaulus — slender wild rye
- Elymus villosus — hairy wild rye
- Elymus virginicus — Virginia wild rye
- Elymus vulpinus — Rydberg's wild rye
- Elymus x dorei — Dore's wild rye
- Elymus x ebingeri — Ebinger's wild rye
- Elymus x hansenii — Hansen's wild rye
- Elymus x maltei — Malte's wild rye
- Elymus x mossii — Moss' wild rye
- Elymus x palmerensis — Palmer's wild rye
- Elymus x pseudorepens — quackgrass
- Eragrostis capillaris — tiny lovegrass
- Eragrostis frankii — Frank's lovegrass
- Eragrostis hypnoides — teal lovegrass
- Eragrostis pectinacea — purple lovegrass
- Eragrostis spectabilis — purple lovegrass
- Festuca altaica — rough fescue
- Festuca baffinensis — Baffin fescue
- Festuca brachyphylla — shortleaf fescue
- Festuca brevissima — Alaska fescue
- Festuca campestris — blue rough fescue
- Festuca edlundiae — Arctic festuca
- Festuca frederikseniae — North Atlantic fescue
- Festuca hallii — Hall's rough fescue
- Festuca heteromalla — spreading fescue
- Festuca hyperborea — boreal fescue
- Festuca idahoensis — Idaho fescue
- Festuca lenensis — tundra fescue
- Festuca minutiflora — smallflower fescue
- Festuca occidentalis — western fescue
- Festuca richardsonii — Richardson's fescue
- Festuca rubra — red fescue
- Festuca saximontana — Rocky Mountain fescue
- Festuca subulata — nodding fescue
- Festuca subuliflora — crinkle-awn fescue
- Festuca subverticillata — nodding fescue
- Festuca viridula — mountain fescue
- Festuca viviparoidea — northern fescue
- Glyceria borealis — small floating mannagrass
- Glyceria canadensis — Canada mannagrass
- Glyceria elata — tall mannagrass
- Glyceria grandis — American mannagrass
- Glyceria laxa — northern mannagrass
- Glyceria leptostachya — slimhead mannagrass
- Glyceria melicaria — slender mannagrass
- Glyceria obtusa — blunt mannagrass
- Glyceria occidentalis — northwestern mannagrass
- Glyceria pulchella — MacKenzie Valley mannagrass
- Glyceria septentrionalis — floating mannagrass
- Glyceria striata — fowl mannagrass
- Glyceria x gatineauensis — Gatineau mannagrass
- Helictotrichon hookeri — spike-oat
- Hesperostipa comata — needle-and-thread
- Hesperostipa curtiseta — western porcupine grass
- Hesperostipa spartea — porcupine needlegrass
- Hierochloe alpina — alpine sweet grass
- Hierochloe hirta — northern sweet grass
- Hierochloe odorata — vanilla grass
- Hierochloe pauciflora — Arctic sweet grass
- Hordeum brachyantherum — meadow barley
- Hordeum jubatum — foxtail barley
- Hordeum pusillum — little barley
- Koeleria asiatica — Oriental junegrass
- Koeleria macrantha — prairie junegrass
- Leersia oryzoides — rice cutgrass
- Leersia virginica — Virginia cutgrass
- Leymus cinereus — Great Basin lyme grass
- Leymus innovatus — northwestern wildrye
- Leymus mollis — sea lyme grass
- Leymus triticoides — beardless lyme grass
- Leymus x vancouverensis — Vancouver Island lyme grass
- Melica bulbosa — western melicgrass
- Melica fugax — small melicgrass
- Melica harfordii — Harford's melicgrass
- Melica hitchcockii — Alberta melicgrass
- Melica smithii — Smith's melicgrass
- Melica spectabilis — showy melicgrass
- Melica subulata — Alaska onion grass
- Milium effusum — tall millet grass
- Monroa squarrosa — munro grass
- Muhlenbergia andina — foxtail muhly
- Muhlenbergia asperifolia — alkali muhly
- Muhlenbergia cuspidata — plains mühlenbergia
- Muhlenbergia filiformis — Pullup muhly
- Muhlenbergia frondosa — wirestem muhly
- Muhlenbergia glomerata — marsh muhly
- Muhlenbergia mexicana — Mexican muhly
- Muhlenbergia racemosa — green muhly
- Muhlenbergia richardsonis — softleaf muhly
- Muhlenbergia schreberi — Schreiber's muhly
- Muhlenbergia sobolifera — cliff muhly
- Muhlenbergia sylvatica — woodland muhly
- Muhlenbergia tenuiflora — slender muhly
- Muhlenbergia uniflora — fall dropseed muhly
- Nassella viridula — green needlegrass
- Oryzopsis asperifolia — white-grained mountain-ricegrass
- Panicum capillare — old witch panicgrass
- Panicum dichotomiflorum — spreading panicgrass
- Panicum flexile — wiry witch grass
- Panicum gattingeri — Gattinger's panicgrass
- Panicum philadelphicum — Philadelphia panicgrass
- Panicum rigidulum — redtop panicgrass
- Panicum virgatum — old switch panicgrass
- Pascopyrum smithii — western wheatgrass
- Paspalum setaceum — slender paspalum
- Phalaris arundinacea — reed canarygrass
- Phippsia algida — ice grass
- Phippsia concinna — snow grass
- Phleum alpinum — mountain timothy
- Phragmites australis — common reed
- Piptatherum canadense — Canada mountain ricegrass
- Piptatherum exiguum — little ricegrass
- Piptatherum micranthum — little mountain-ricegrass
- Piptatherum pungens — slender mountain-ricegrass
- Piptatherum racemosum — blackfruit mountain-ricegrass
- Piptochaetium avenaceum — blackseed needlegrass
- Pleuropogon refractus — nodding false semaphore grass
- Pleuropogon sabinei — sabine-grass
- Poa abbreviata — northern bluegrass
- Poa alpina — alpine bluegrass
- Poa alsodes — grove meadow grass
- Poa arctica — Arctic bluegrass
- Poa arida — prairie bluegrass
- Poa confinis — dune bluegrass
- Poa cusickii — Cusick's bluegrass
- Poa eminens — largeflower bluegrass
- Poa fendleriana — muttongrass
- Poa flexuosa — flexible bluegrass
- Poa gaspensis — Gaspé Peninsula bluegrass
- Poa glauca — white bluegrass
- Poa hartzii — Hartz' bluegrass
- Poa howellii — Howell's bluegrass
- Poa interior — inland bluegrass
- Poa laxa — Mt. Washington bluegrass
- Poa laxiflora — loose-flowered bluegrass
- Poa leibergii — Leiberg's bluegrass
- Poa leptocoma — bog bluegrass
- Poa lettermanii — Letterman's bluegrass
- Poa macrantha — sand-dune bluegrass
- Poa marcida — weak bluegrass
- Poa nemoralis — woods bluegrass
- Poa nervosa — Hooker's bluegrass
- Poa palustris — fowl bluegrass
- Poa porsildii — Porsild's bluegrass
- Poa pratensis — Kentucky bluegrass
- Poa pseudoabbreviata — polar bluegrass
- Poa reflexa — nodding bluegrass
- Poa saltuensis — drooping bluegrass
- Poa secunda — curly bluegrass
- Poa stenantha — narrowflower bluegrass
- Poa suksdorfii — western bluegrass
- Poa sylvestris — woodland bluegrass
- Poa tolmatchewii — Tolmatchew's bluegrass
- Poa wheeleri Wheeler's bluegrass
- Poa x limosa — Lassen County bluegrass
- Pseudoroegneria spicata — Bluebunch wheatgrass
- Puccinellia agrostidea — tundra alkali grass
- Puccinellia ambigua — Alberton alkali grass
- Puccinellia americana — American alkali grass
- Puccinellia andersonii — Anderson's alkali grass
- Puccinellia angustata — northern alkali grass
- Puccinellia arctica — Arctic alkali grass
- Puccinellia bruggemannii — Prince Patrick alkali grass
- Puccinellia deschampsioides — polar alkali grass
- Puccinellia distans — spreading alkali grass
- Puccinellia fasciculata — saltmarsh goosegrass
- Puccinellia grandis — Pacific alkali grass
- Puccinellia interior — inland alkali grass
- Puccinellia kurilensis — dwarf alkali grass
- Puccinellia laurentiana — Tracadigash Mountain alkali grass
- Puccinellia lemmonii — Lemmon's alkali grass
- Puccinellia lucida — shining alkali grass
- Puccinellia macra — Bonaventure Island alkali grass
- Puccinellia nutkaensis — Alaska alkali grass
- Puccinellia nuttalliana — Nuttall's alkali grass
- Puccinellia phryganodes — creeping alkali grass
- Puccinellia poacea — floodplain alkali grass
- Puccinellia tenella — tundra alkali grass
- Puccinellia vaginata — Arctic tussock alkali grass
- Puccinellia vahliana — Vahl's alkali grass
- Schedonnardus paniculatus — tumble grass
- Schizachne purpurascens — purple oat
- Schizachyrium scoparium — little bluestem
- Scolochloa festucacea — sprangletop
- Sorghastrum nutans — yellow Indiangrass
- Spartina alterniflora — saltwater cordgrass
- Spartina gracilis — alkali cordgrass
- Spartina patens — saltmeadow cordgrass
- Spartina pectinata — freshwater cordgrass
- Spartina x caespitosa — marsh cordgrass
- Sphenopholis intermedia — slender wedgescale
- Sphenopholis nitida — shiny wedgegrass
- Sphenopholis obtusata — prairie wedgegrass
- Sporobolus airoides — alkali sacaton
- Sporobolus compositus — tall dropseed
- Sporobolus cryptandrus — sand dropseed
- Sporobolus heterolepis — northern dropseed
- Sporobolus neglectus — small dropseed
- Sporobolus vaginiflorus — sheathed dropseed
- Torreyochloa pallida — pale manna grass
- Triplasis purpurea — purple sandgrass
- Trisetum canescens — nodding trisetum
- Trisetum melicoides — purple false oats
- Trisetum montanum — mountain oats
- Trisetum sibiricum — Siberian false oats
- Trisetum spicatum — narrow false oats
- Trisetum wolfii — beardless oats
- Vahlodea atropurpurea — mountain hairgrass
- Vulpia microstachys — small six-weeks grass
- Vulpia octoflora — slender eight-flowered fescue
- Zizania aquatica — eastern wild rice
- Zizania palustris — northern wild rice
- x Agroelymus bowdenii
- x Dupoa labradorica
- x Elyhordeum chatangensis
- x Elyhordeum macounii
- x Elyhordeum montanense
- x Elyhordeum schaackianum
- x Elyleymus colvillensis
- x Elyleymus hirtiflorus
- x Elyleymus jamesensis
- x Elyleymus turneri
- x Elyleymus uclueletensis
- x Elyleymus ungavensis
- x Pucciphippsia vacillans

== Podostemaceae ==
- Podostemum ceratophyllum — threadfoot

== Polemoniaceae ==
- Collomia grandiflora — largeflower collomia
- Collomia heterophylla — varied-leaved collomia
- Collomia linearis — narrow-leaved collomia
- Collomia tenella — diffuse collomia
- Gilia sinuata — rosy gilia
- Gilia tenerrima — delicate gilia
- Ipomopsis aggregata — scarlet skyrocket
- Ipomopsis minutiflora — smallflower standing-cypress
- Leptodactylon pungens — granite prickly-phlox
- Linanthus bicolor — bicoloured desert-gold
- Linanthus harknessii — harkness linanthus
- Linanthus septentrionalis — northern desert-gold
- Navarretia divaricata — mountain navarretia
- Navarretia intertexta — needleleaf navarretia
- Navarretia leucocephala — whiteflower navarretia
- Navarretia squarrosa — skunkweed
- Phlox alyssifolia — alyssum-leaf phlox
- Phlox caespitosa — carpet phlox
- Phlox diffusa — spreading phlox
- Phlox divaricata — wild blue phlox
- Phlox gracilis — slender phlox
- Phlox hoodii — Hood's phlox
- Phlox longifolia — longleaf phlox
- Phlox maculata — northern meadow phlox
- Phlox richardsonii — Richardson's phlox
- Phlox sibirica — Siberian phlox
- Phlox speciosa — showy phlox
- Polemonium acutiflorum — tall Jacob's-ladder
- Polemonium boreale — northern Jacob's-ladder
- Polemonium californicum — California polemonium
- Polemonium elegans — elegant polemonium
- Polemonium micranthum — annual polemonium
- Polemonium occidentale — western Jacob's-ladder
- Polemonium pulcherrimum — showy Jacob's-ladder
- Polemonium vanbruntiae — bog Jacob's-ladder
- Polemonium viscosum — skunk polemonium

== Polygalaceae ==
- Polygala alba — white milkwort
- Polygala incarnata — pink milkwort
- Polygala paucifolia — gaywing milkwort
- Polygala polygama — racemed milkwort
- Polygala sanguinea — field milkwort
- Polygala senega — Seneca snakeroot
- Polygala verticillata — whorled milkwort

== Polygonaceae ==
- Eriogonum androsaceum — rock-jasmine wild buckwheat
- Eriogonum cernuum — nodding wild buckwheat
- Eriogonum flavum — yellow wild buckwheat
- Eriogonum heracleoides — parsnip-flower wild buckwheat
- Eriogonum niveum — snow wild buckwheat
- Eriogonum ovalifolium — oval-leaf buckwheat
- Eriogonum pauciflorum — smallflower wild buckwheat
- Eriogonum pyrolifolium — pyrola-leaved wild buckwheat
- Eriogonum strictum — blue mountain wild buckwheat
- Eriogonum umbellatum — sulphur-flower wild buckwheat
- Koenigia islandica — island kœnigia
- Oxyria digyna — mountain-sorrel
- Polygonella articulata — eastern jointweed
- Polygonum achoreum — leathery knotweed
- Polygonum alpinum — alpine smartweed
- Polygonum amphibium — water smartweed
- Polygonum arifolium — halberd-leaf tearthumb
- Polygonum bellardii — narrowleaf knotweed
- Polygonum bistorta — meadow bistort
- Polygonum bistortoides — American bistort
- Polygonum boreale — northern knotweed
- Polygonum buxiforme — Small's knotweed
- Polygonum careyi — Carey's smartweed
- Polygonum caurianum — Alaska knotweed
- Polygonum ciliinode — fringed black-bindweed
- Polygonum douglasii — Douglas' knotweed
- Polygonum erectum — erect knotweed
- Polygonum fowleri — Fowler's knotweed
- Polygonum franktonii — Nova Scotia knotweed
- Polygonum hudsonianum — Hudson Bay knotweed
- Polygonum hydropiper — marshpepper smartweed
- Polygonum hydropiperoides — mild water-pepper
- Polygonum lapathifolium — dockleaf smartweed
- Polygonum minimum — leafy dwarf knotweed
- Polygonum oxyspermum — sharpfruit knotweed
- Polygonum paronychia — beach knotweed
- Polygonum pensylvanicum — Pennsylvania smartweed
- Polygonum polygaloides — white-margin knotweed
- Polygonum raii — Ray's knotweed
- Polygonum ramosissimum — bushy knotweed
- Polygonum robustius — stout smartweed
- Polygonum sagittatum — arrowleaf tearthumb
- Polygonum scandens — climbing false buckwheat
- Polygonum tenue — slender knotweed
- Polygonum virginianum — Virginia knotweed
- Polygonum viviparum — viviparous knotweed
- Rumex acetosa — common sorrel
- Rumex altissimus — tall dock
- Rumex aquaticus — western dock
- Rumex arcticus — Arctic dock
- Rumex beringensis — Bering Sea dock
- Rumex maritimus — seaside dock
- Rumex occidentalis
- Rumex orbiculatus — water dock
- Rumex pallidus — seabeach dock
- Rumex paucifolius — alpine sheep sorrel
- Rumex salicifolius — willow dock
- Rumex venosus — veined dock
- Rumex verticillatus — swamp dock
- Rumex x alexidis
- Rumex x franktonis — Frankton's dock

== Polypodiaceae ==
- Polypodium amorphum — irregular polypody
- Polypodium appalachianum — Appalachian rockcap fern
- Polypodium glycyrrhiza — licorice fern
- Polypodium hesperium — western polypody
- Polypodium scouleri — coast polypody
- Polypodium sibiricum — Siberian polypody
- Polypodium virginianum — rock polypody
- Polypodium x incognitum

== Polytrichaceae ==
- Atrichum altecristatum
- Atrichum angustatum
- Atrichum crispum
- Atrichum haussknechtii
- Atrichum oerstedianum
- Atrichum selwynii
- Atrichum tenellum
- Atrichum undulatum — wavy catherinea
- Bartramiopsis lescurii
- Oligotrichum aligerum
- Oligotrichum falcatum
- Oligotrichum hercynicum
- Oligotrichum parallelum
- Pogonatum brachyphyllum — haircap
- Pogonatum contortum
- Pogonatum dentatum — haircap
- Pogonatum pensilvanicum
- Pogonatum urnigerum — haircap
- Polytrichastrum alpinum — alpine polytrichastrum moss
- Polytrichum commune — common haircap moss
- Polytrichum formosum
- Polytrichum hyperboreum
- Polytrichum juniperinum — juniper moss
- Polytrichum longisetum — haircap
- Polytrichum lyallii
- Polytrichum ohioense
- Polytrichum pallidisetum
- Polytrichum piliferum — hairmoss
- Polytrichum sexangulare
- Polytrichum sphaerothecium
- Polytrichum strictum — bog haircap moss
- Polytrichum swartzii
- Psilopilum cavifolium
- Psilopilum laevigatum

== Pontederiaceae ==
- Heteranthera dubia — grassleaf mud-plantain
- Pontederia cordata — pickerelweed

== Porellaceae ==
- Porella cordaeana
- Porella navicularis
- Porella pinnata
- Porella platyphylla
- Porella platyphylloidea
- Porella roellii

== Portulacaceae ==
- Calandrinia ciliata — red maids
- Cistanthe tweedyi — Tweedy's bitterroot
- Cistanthe umbellata — Mount Hood pussy-paws
- Claytonia caroliniana — Carolina spring-beauty
- Claytonia cordifolia — heartleaf spring-beauty
- Claytonia exigua — serpentine spring-beauty
- Claytonia lanceolata — lanceleaf spring-beauty
- Claytonia megarhiza — alpine spring-beauty
- Claytonia ogilviensis — Ogilve Mountain spring-beauty
- Claytonia parviflora — littleflower spring-beauty
- Claytonia perfoliata — miner's-lettuce
- Claytonia rubra — redstem spring-beauty
- Claytonia sarmentosa — Alaska spring-beauty
- Claytonia scammaniana — Scamman's spring-beauty
- Claytonia sibirica — Siberian spring-beauty
- Claytonia tuberosa — tuber spring-beauty
- Claytonia virginica — narrowleaf spring-beauty
- Claytonia washingtoniana — Washington spring-beauty
- Lewisia columbiana — Columbian bitterroot
- Lewisia pygmaea — alpine bitterroot
- Lewisia rediviva — Oregon bitterroot
- Lewisia triphylla — three-leaf bitterroot
- Montia bostockii — Bostock's miner's-lettuce
- Montia chamissoi — Chamisso's miner's-lettuce
- Montia dichotoma — dwarf miner's-lettuce
- Montia diffusa — diffuse montia
- Montia fontana — fountain miner's-lettuce
- Montia howellii — Howell's miner's-lettuce
- Montia linearis — linearleaf miner's-lettuce
- Montia parvifolia — littleleaf miner's-lettuce
- Talinum sediforme — Okanogan flameflower

== Potamogetonaceae ==
- Potamogeton alpinus — northern pondweed
- Potamogeton amplifolius — largeleaf pondweed
- Potamogeton bicupulatus — snail-seed pondweed
- Potamogeton compressus — flatstem pondweed
- Potamogeton confervoides — algæ-like pondweed
- Potamogeton epihydrus — Nuttall's pondweed
- Potamogeton filiformis — slender pondweed
- Potamogeton foliosus — leafy pondweed
- Potamogeton friesii — Fries' pondweed
- Potamogeton gramineus — grassy pondweed
- Potamogeton hillii — Hill's pondweed
- Potamogeton illinoensis — Illinois pondweed
- Potamogeton methyensis — Methy Lake pondweed
- Potamogeton natans — floating pondweed
- Potamogeton nodosus — longleaf pondweed
- Potamogeton oakesianus — Oakes' pondweed
- Potamogeton oblongus — cinnamon-spot pondweed
- Potamogeton obtusifolius — bluntleaf pondweed
- Potamogeton ogdenii — Ogden's pondweed
- Potamogeton pectinatus — Sago pondweed
- Potamogeton perfoliatus — claspingleaf pondweed
- Potamogeton praelongus — whitestem pondweed
- Potamogeton pulcher — spotted pondweed
- Potamogeton pusillus — slender pondweed
- Potamogeton richardsonii — redheadgrass
- Potamogeton robbinsii — flatleaf pondweed
- Potamogeton spirillus — spiral pondweed
- Potamogeton strictifolius — straightleaf pondweed
- Potamogeton subsibiricus — Yenisei River pondweed
- Potamogeton vaginatus — sheathed pondweed
- Potamogeton vaseyi — Vasey's pondweed
- Potamogeton × faxonii — Faxon's pondweed
- Potamogeton × griffithii — Griffith's pondweed
- Potamogeton × hagstroemii — Hagstrøm's pondweed
- Potamogeton × haynesii — Haynes' pondweed
- Potamogeton × nericus
- Potamogeton × nitens
- Potamogeton × saxonicus — Saxon pondweed
- Potamogeton × schreberi — Schreiber's pondweed
- Potamogeton × scoliophyllus
- Potamogeton × sparganiifolius
- Potamogeton × spathuliformis
- Potamogeton × suecicus

== Pottiaceae ==
- Acaulon muticum
- Acaulon triquetrum
- Aloina bifrons
- Aloina brevirostris
- Aloina rigida
- Anoectangium aestivum
- Anoectangium tenuinerve
- Astomum muehlenbergianum
- Astomum phascoides
- Barbula amplexifolia
- Barbula convoluta
- Barbula coreensis
- Barbula eustegia
- Barbula indica
- Barbula unguiculata
- Bryoerythrophyllum columbianum
- Bryoerythrophyllum ferruginascens
- Bryoerythrophyllum recurvirostre
- Crossidium aberrans
- Crossidium seriatum
- Crumia latifolia
- Desmatodon cernuus
- Desmatodon convolutus
- Desmatodon guepinii
- Desmatodon heimii
- Desmatodon latifolius
- Desmatodon laureri
- Desmatodon leucostoma
- Desmatodon obtusifolius
- Desmatodon porteri
- Desmatodon randii
- Desmatodon systylius
- Didymodon asperifolius
- Didymodon fallax
- Didymodon johansenii
- Didymodon leskeoides
- Didymodon michiganensis
- Didymodon nevadensis
- Didymodon nigrescens
- Didymodon rigidulus
- Didymodon subandreaeoides
- Didymodon tophaceus
- Didymodon vinealis
- Eucladium verticillatum — lime-seep eucladium
- Geheebia gigantea
- Gymnostomum aeruginosum
- Gymnostomum calcareum
- Gyroweisia reflexa
- Gyroweisia tenuis
- Hymenostylium insigne
- Hymenostylium recurvirostre — hymenostylium moss
- Hyophila involuta — hyophila moss
- Molendoa sendtneriana
- Oxystegus spiralis
- Oxystegus tenuirostris
- Paraleptodontium recurvifolium
- Phascum cuspidatum
- Phascum floerkeanum
- Phascum vlassovii
- Pleurochaete squarrosa
- Pottia bryoides
- Pottia davalliana
- Pottia intermedia
- Pottia nevadensis
- Pottia truncata
- Pottia wilsonii
- Pseudocrossidium revolutum
- Pterygoneurum kozlovii
- Pterygoneurum lamellatum
- Pterygoneurum ovatum
- Pterygoneurum subsessile
- Stegonia latifolia
- Stegonia pilifera
- Timmiella crassinervis
- Tortella arctica
- Tortella fragilis
- Tortella humilis
- Tortella inclinata
- Tortella tortelloides
- Tortella tortuosa — twisted moss
- Tortula amplexa
- Tortula bartramii
- Tortula bolanderi
- Tortula brevipes
- Tortula cainii
- Tortula caninervis — tortula moss
- Tortula laevipila
- Tortula latifolia
- Tortula mucronifolia
- Tortula muralis
- Tortula norvegica
- Tortula papillosa
- Tortula papillosissima
- Tortula princeps
- Tortula ruralis — tortula moss
- Tortula scotteri
- Tortula subulata
- Trichostomopsis australasiae
- Trichostomum arcticum
- Trichostomum crispulum
- Weissia controversa
- Weissia hedwigii

== Primulaceae ==
- Anagallis minima — chaffweed
- Androsace alaskana (syn. Douglasia alaskana) — Alaska rock-jasmine
- Androsace chamaejasme — sweetflower rock-jasmine
- Androsace filiformis — slender rock-jasmine
- Androsace laevigata (syn. Douglasia laevigata) — cliff douglasia
- Androsace montana (syn. Douglasia montana) — mountain douglasia
- Androsace occidentalis — western rock-jasmine
- Androsace ochotensis (syns. Androsace arctica, Douglasia ochotensis) — Alaska douglasia
- Androsace septentrionalis (syn. Douglasia ochotensis subsp. gormanii ) — pygmyflower rock-jasmine, Gorman's douglasia
- Dodecatheon conjugens — Bonneville shootingstar
- Dodecatheon dentatum — white shootingstar
- Dodecatheon frigidum — northern shootingstar
- Dodecatheon hendersonii — Henderson's shootingstar
- Dodecatheon jeffreyi — Jeffrey's shootingstar
- Dodecatheon meadia — shootingstar
- Dodecatheon pulchellum — few-flower shootingstar
- Glaux maritima — sea milkwort
- Lysimachia ciliata — fringed loosestrife
- Lysimachia hybrida — lanceleaf loosestrife
- Lysimachia lanceolata — lanceleaf loosestrife
- Lysimachia quadriflora — four-flower loosestrife
- Lysimachia quadrifolia — whorled yellow loosestrife
- Lysimachia terrestris — swamp loosestrife
- Lysimachia thyrsiflora — water loosestrife
- Lysimachia × commixta — mixed loosestrife
- Lysimachia × producta — elongated loosestrife
- Primula borealis — slender primrose
- Primula cuneifolia — wedgeleaf primrose
- Primula egaliksensis — Greenland primrose
- Primula eximia — Arctic primrose
- Primula incana — Jones' primrose
- Primula laurentiana — St. Lawrence primrose
- Primula mistassinica — bird's-eye primrose
- Primula nutans — sleepy primrose
- Primula stricta — stiff primrose
- Samolus valerandi — Valerand's brookweed
- Trientalis borealis — northern starflower
- Trientalis europaea — Arctic starflower

== Pseudolepicoleaceae ==
- Blepharostoma trichophyllum

== Pteridaceae ==
- Adiantum aleuticum — Aleutian maidenhair fern
- Adiantum capillus-veneris — southern maidenhair fern
- Adiantum pedatum — northern maidenhair fern
- Adiantum viridimontanum — Green Mountain maidenhair fern
- Aspidotis densa — Indian's-dream
- Cheilanthes feei — Fee's lipfern
- Cheilanthes gracillima — lace lipfern
- Cryptogramma acrostichoides — American rockbrake
- Cryptogramma cascadensis — Cascade rockbrake
- Cryptogramma sitchensis — Sitka rockbrake
- Cryptogramma stelleri — fragile rockbrake
- Pellaea atropurpurea — purplestem rockbrake
- Pellaea gastonyi — Gastony's rockbrake
- Pellaea glabella — smooth rockbrake
- Pentagramma triangularis — western gold fern

== Pterigynandraceae ==
- Heterocladium dimorphum
- Heterocladium macounii
- Heterocladium procurrens
- Iwatsukiella leucotricha
- Myurella julacea
- Myurella sibirica
- Myurella tenerrima
- Pterigynandrum filiforme

== Ptilidiaceae ==
- Ptilidium ciliare — northern naugehyde liverwort
- Ptilidium pulcherrimum

== Ptychomitriaceae ==
- Campylostelium saxicola — rock-loving swan-necked moss
- Ptychomitrium gardneri
- Ptychomitrium incurvum

== Pyrolaceae ==
- Chimaphila maculata — spotted wintergreen
- Chimaphila menziesii — Menzies' wintergreen
- Chimaphila umbellata — common wintergreen
- Moneses uniflora — one-flower wintergreen
- Orthilia secunda — one-side wintergreen
- Pyrola americana — American wintergreen
- Pyrola asarifolia — pink wintergreen
- Pyrola chlorantha — greenflower wintergreen
- Pyrola elliptica — shinleaf
- Pyrola grandiflora — Arctic wintergreen
- Pyrola minor — lesser wintergreen
- Pyrola picta — whitevein wintergreen
