= Primula egaliksensis =

Scientific classification
- Kingdom: Plantae
- Clade: Embryophytes
- Clade: Tracheophytes
- Clade: Angiosperms
- Clade: Eudicots
- Clade: Asterids
- Order: Ericales
- Family: Primulaceae
- Genus: Primula
- Species: P. egaliksensis

Binomial name
- Primula egaliksensis Wormsk.

Species of flowering plant

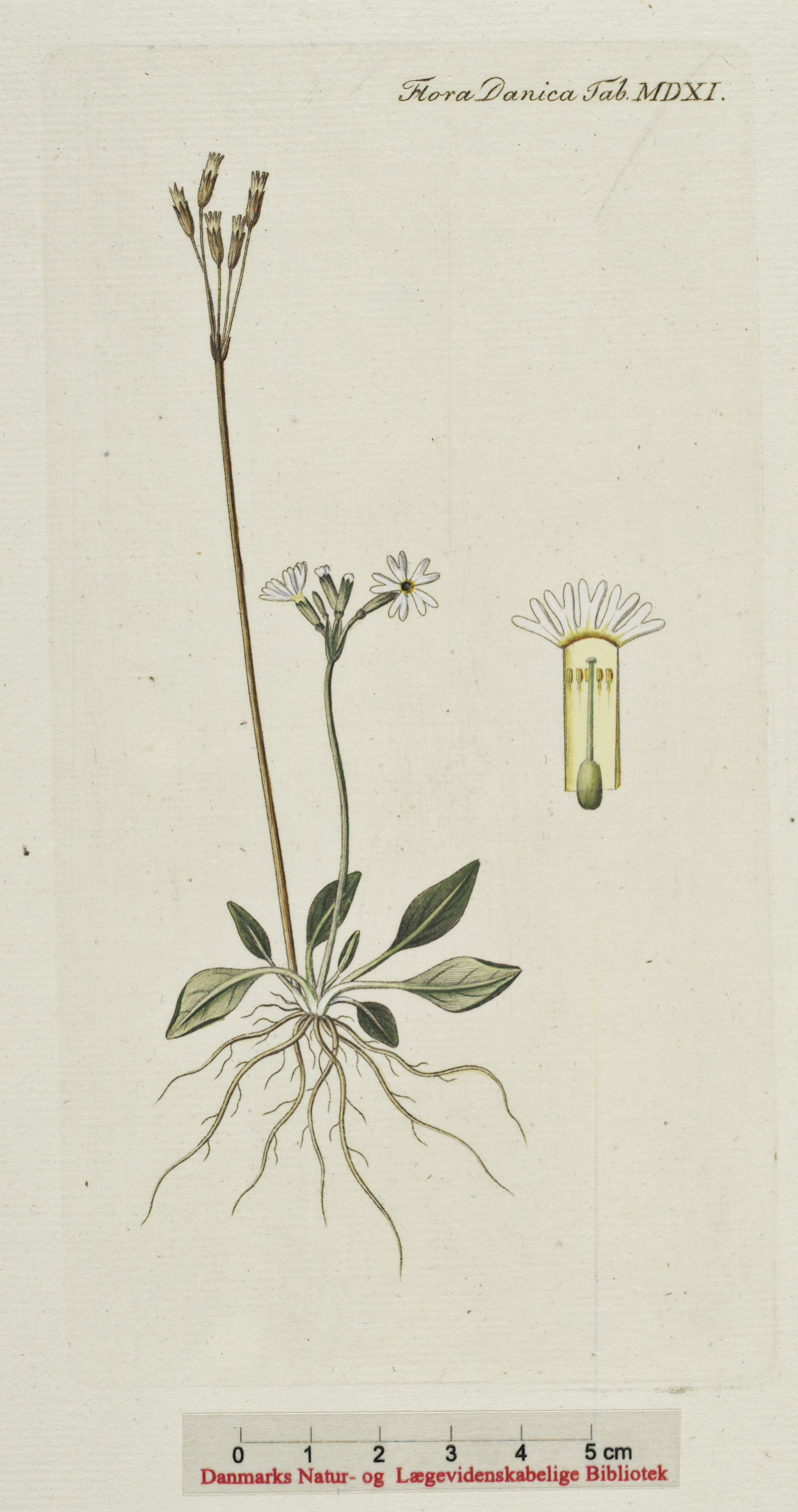
Botanical illustration of Primula egaliksensis

Primula egaliksensis, the Greenland primrose, also called Primula groenlandica, is a flower from the genus Primula. It was first documented by Morten Wormskjold and Jens Wilken Hornemann in 1813 while Wormskjold was on an expedition to Greenland. The flower is primarily found in Greenland and the northern part of North America. The Greenland primrose was also discovered in Iceland in 1911.

== Description ==
Primula egaliksensis has a thin stem and is about 5–15 cm (2.0–5.9 in) tall. The basal leaves are thin, with an irregular, ellipsoid shape, smooth-edged, and never starchy. It has fronds the same length as the stem. The flower is blueish and blooms from May to June (earlier in Iceland) during its six-week growing season.

== Taxonomy ==
This plant has no subspecies.

Morphology and genetics suggest that Primula egaliksensis was originally a hybrid between sections Aleuritia and Armerina, and possible ancestors are P. nutans and P. mistassinica or a prehistoric form of that species.

== Distribution and habitat ==
Primula egaliksensis is found in:

- Greenland (Tunugdliarfik Fjord, Igaliku, and Itvineq and Ilualiafik in Nuup Kangerlua)
- All of the provinces and territories of Canada except Saskatchewan, New Brunswick, and Prince Edward Island
- Alaska, Colorado, and Wyoming in the United States
- Northeastern Russia

The flower has been found only one place in Iceland: Stóru-Hamundarstaðir in Eyjafjörður. It has been a protected species since 1978, but it is now considered extinct in the country.

The Greenland primrose prefers humid meadows, places near streams and moist coastal locations, and peat bogs.
