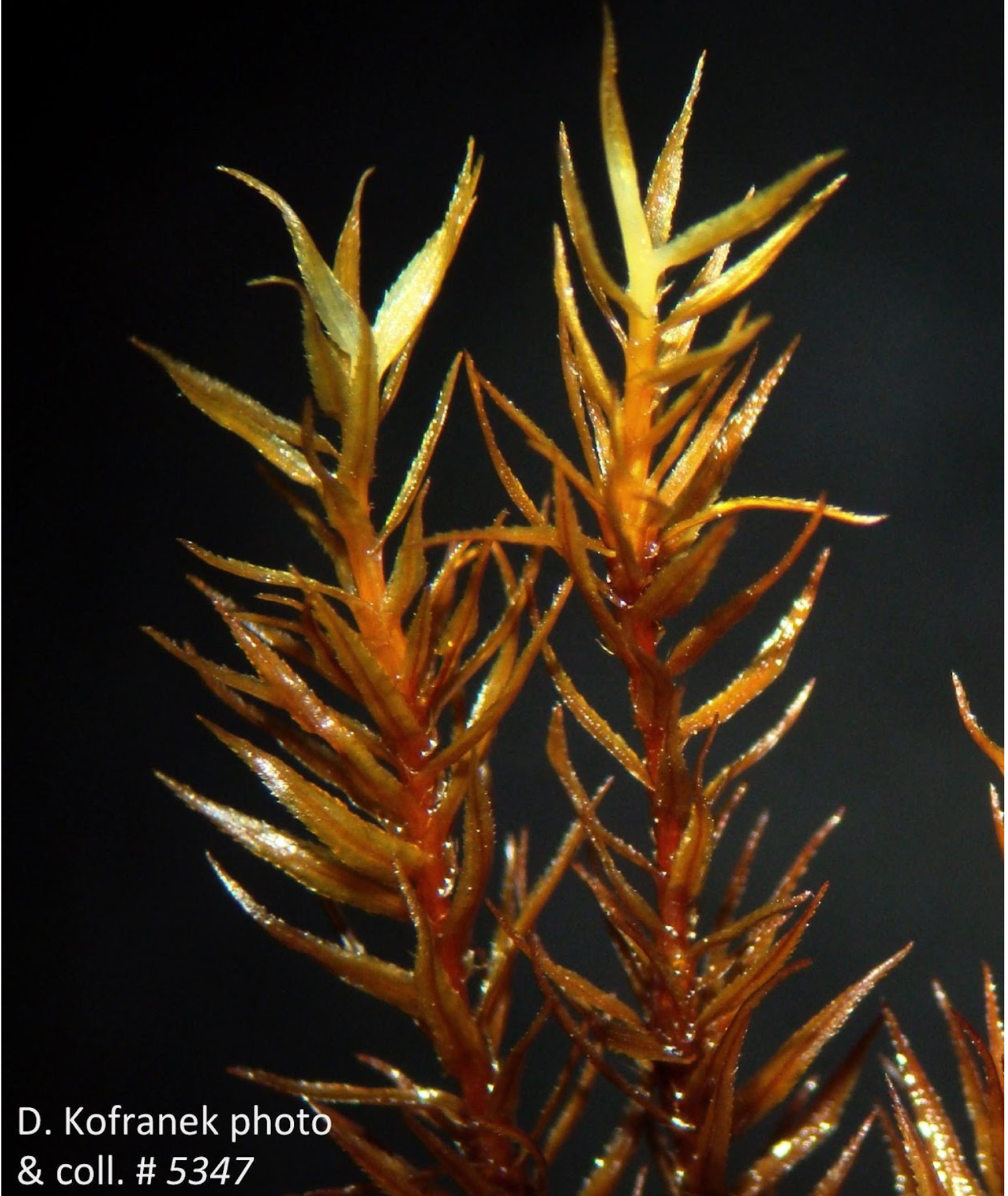

Scientific classification
- Kingdom: Plantae
- Division: Bryophyta
- Class: Polytrichopsida
- Order: Polytrichales
- Family: Polytrichaceae
- Genus: Bartramiopsis
- Species: B. lescurii

Binomial name
- Bartramiopsis lescurii (James) Kindb.

Synonyms
- Atrichum lescurii; Oligotrichum lescurii; Bartramiopsis sitkana; Lyellia lescurii

= Bartramiopsis lescurii =

Species of bryophytes

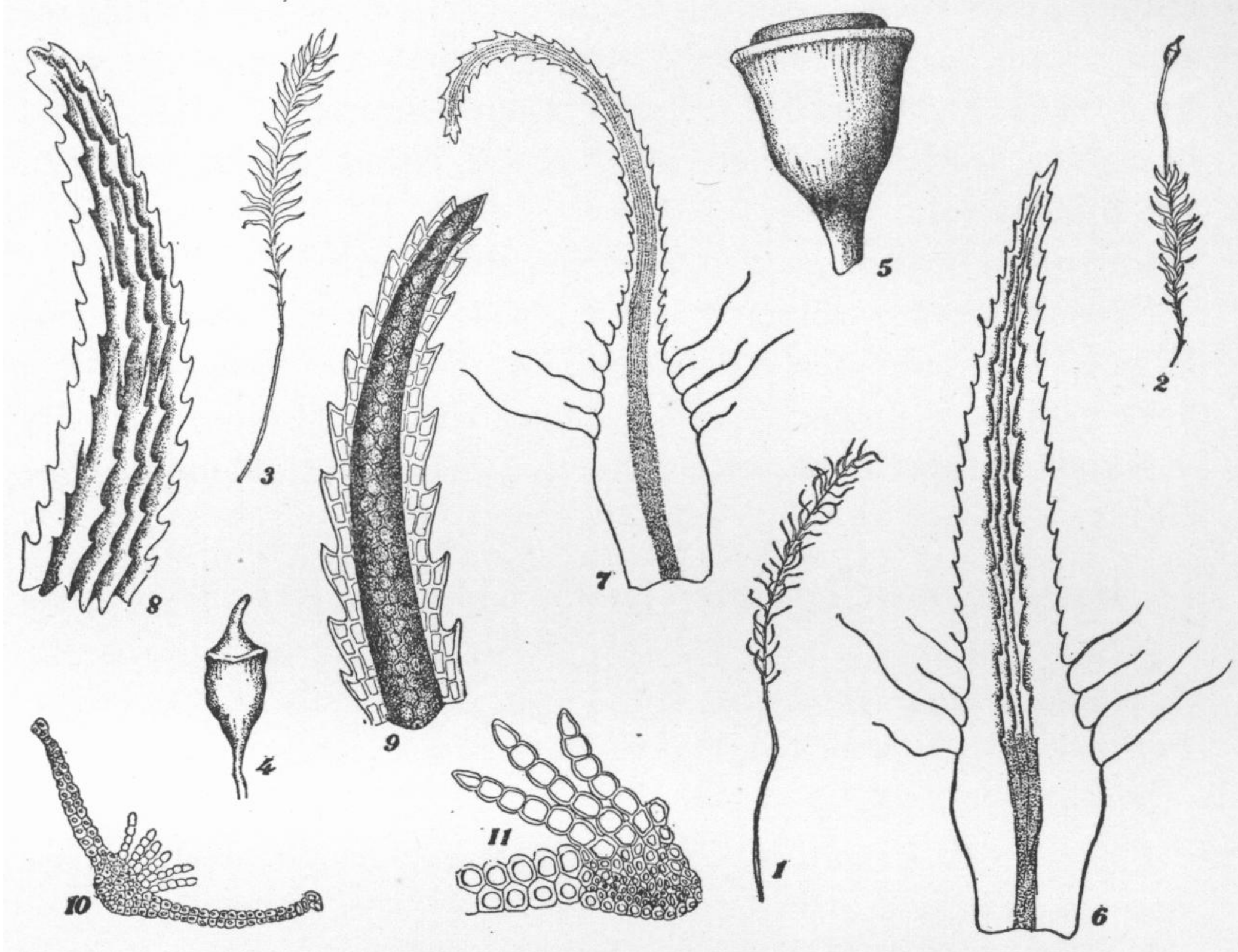
Botanical illustration of Bartramiopsis lescurii. 1 = Plant dry, 2 = Moist plant, with capsule, 3 = Moist plant, without capsule, 4 = Capsule with calyptra, 5 = Mature capsule without operculum, 6 = Leaf showing hairs at margin and lamellae on upper side, 7 = Leaf showing narrower blade and more curved tip, 8 = Leaf tip, upper side, showing lamellae, 9 = Underside of leaf tip,10 = Cross section of leaf, 11 = Cross section of a few lamellae

Bartramiopsis lescurii, also known as false apple moss, is found in North America from Washington to Alaska, in East Russia, and Japan. This moss is in the Polytrichaceae family, however unlike most mosses in this family, Bartramiopsis lescurii does not have peristome teeth.

== Description ==
Bartramiopsis lescurii grows in tufts, and are acrocarpous. B. lescurii can be dull olive green to dark green, and with age they can turn to be dark reddish brown or black.

Stems are erect and simple. They can be up to 10 cm (3.9 in) tall, but are usually 2–5 cm (0.8–2.0 in) tall. Lower stems have sheathing scales and lack leaves

When moist the leaves are spreading, and when dry the leaves of this moss are crisp and contorted, 4–6 mm (0.16–0.24 in). Leaves are linear-lanceolate from the sheathing base. Above the base, leaves are serrate. Above the base the leaf is serrate and has plane margins. B. lescurri has a costa that is percurrent, broad, and smooth at the base. On the ventral side of the costa there are 4–9 serrate lamellae that are 3–9 cells high. The cells on this ventral side are mammillose, quadrate to irregular, and have thick cell walls. The sheath is unistratose and has hyaline cells. At the shoulder between the sheathing base and leaf blade, there are 3–5 hairs, or cilia, that are 0.4–0.7 mm (0.016–0.028 in) long that shorten into teeth towards the blade. The lamina above the sheath is bistratose, and the margins are unistratose or bistratose with a layer of unistratose cells. B. lescurri is dioecious. The seta is thick and is 7–12 mm (0.28–0.47 in) long. The attached capsule is erect and yellowish-brown. After the operculum is shed, the capsule has a membrane, or epiphragm, that is above the rim of the capsule. This species does not have peristome teeth. The spores of this species are ovate to spherical, 0.12–0.16 mm (0.0047–0.0063 in), and are papillose. The gametophyte of this plant can be persistent year-round, and sporophytes generally emerge in early spring and remain attached throughout its life.

== Distribution and habitat ==
Bartramiopsis lescurri's range in North America stretches from Alaska to Washington state; this includes British Columbia. It is also found in the extreme east of Russia and in Japan.

In Alaska, it has been found in Virgin Bay, Oracle, Douglas Island, and Wrangell. In Russia this species has been historically found in Primorsky Krai, Sakhalin, and in the Kamchatka Peninsula.

B. lescurri has been found on soil embankments, or on soil over rock or roots. In British Columbia it has been found in cool, shady, and humid canyons, and in low elevations in wet, coniferous forest around stream terraces. Bartramiopsis lescurri has been commonly found on vertical substrates, usually on mineral soil or upturned root systems soil.

In Eastern Russia this species has been found growing with Calypogeia lunulifolia, and with Diplophyllum taxifolium. Other associated species that this moss grows with are Aruncus sylvester, Amelanchier alnifolia, Alnus viridis, Erythranthe lewisii, Festuca occidentalis, Saxifragaceae spp., Oligotrichum aligerum, Bucklandiella sudetica, and Diplophyllum sp. Nearby species include Pohlia drummondii sp, Blindia acuta, Codriophorus acicularis, Dicranum howellii, Pogonatum urnigerum, Polytrichastrum alpinum, Scapania americana, Plagiothecium piliferum, Philonotis capillaris, Pellia epiphylla, and Marsupella profunda. Bartramiopsis lescurri is a pioneer species, and can be outcompeted by other bryophytes.

== Environmental threats ==
Due to the vertical substrate and surface that Bartramiopsis lescurri inhabits, this population may face rockslide threats that could devastate the population. Changes in the climate, in particular with changes in precipitation and temperature, may endanger their particular habitat disrupting the population of Bartramiopsis lescurri. Other threats to this population and its habitat can include hiking and rock climbing, trail construction, and disruption to individuals by collection for scientific purposes.

== Gallery ==
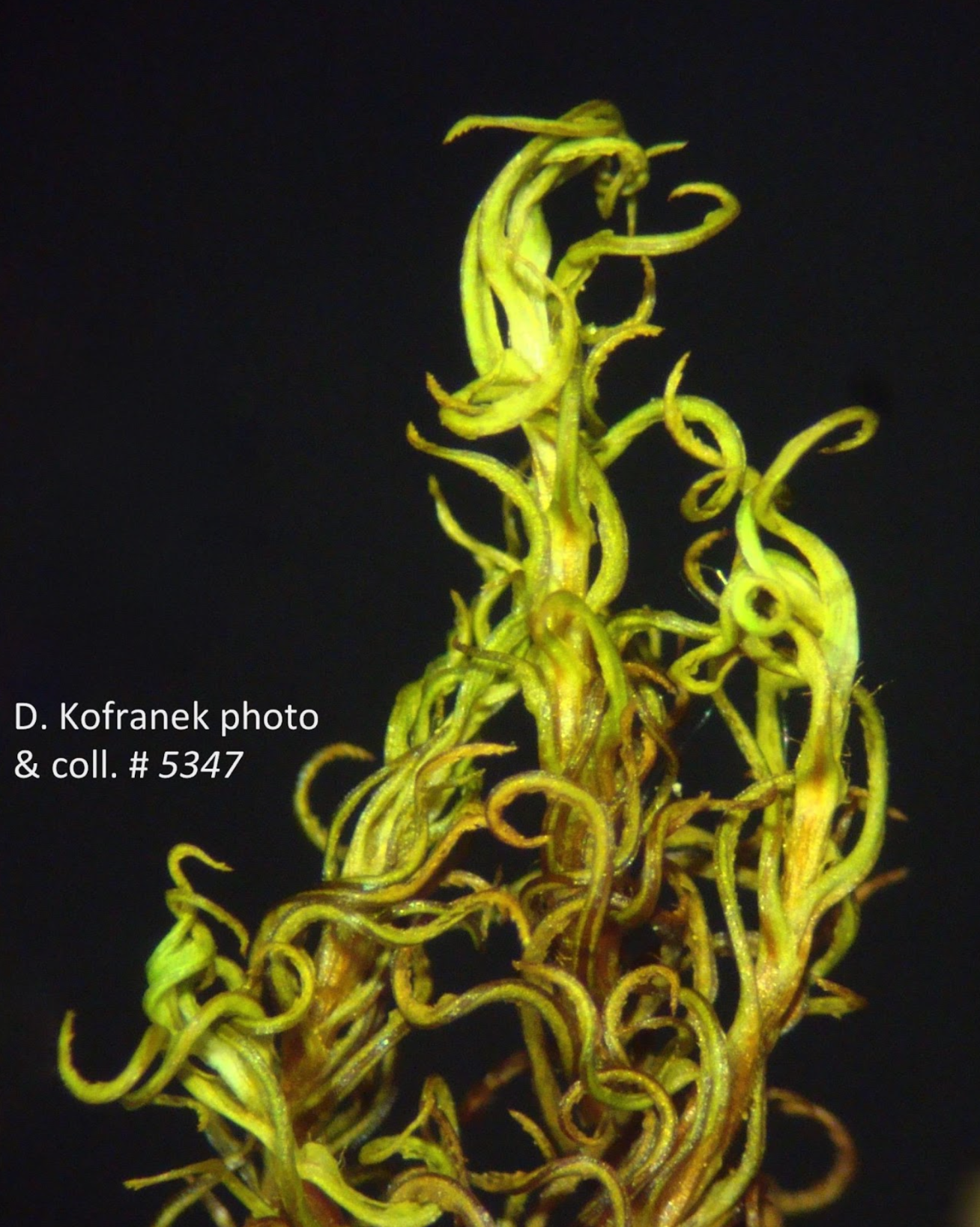
Dry and contorted shoots of Bartramiopsis lescurii

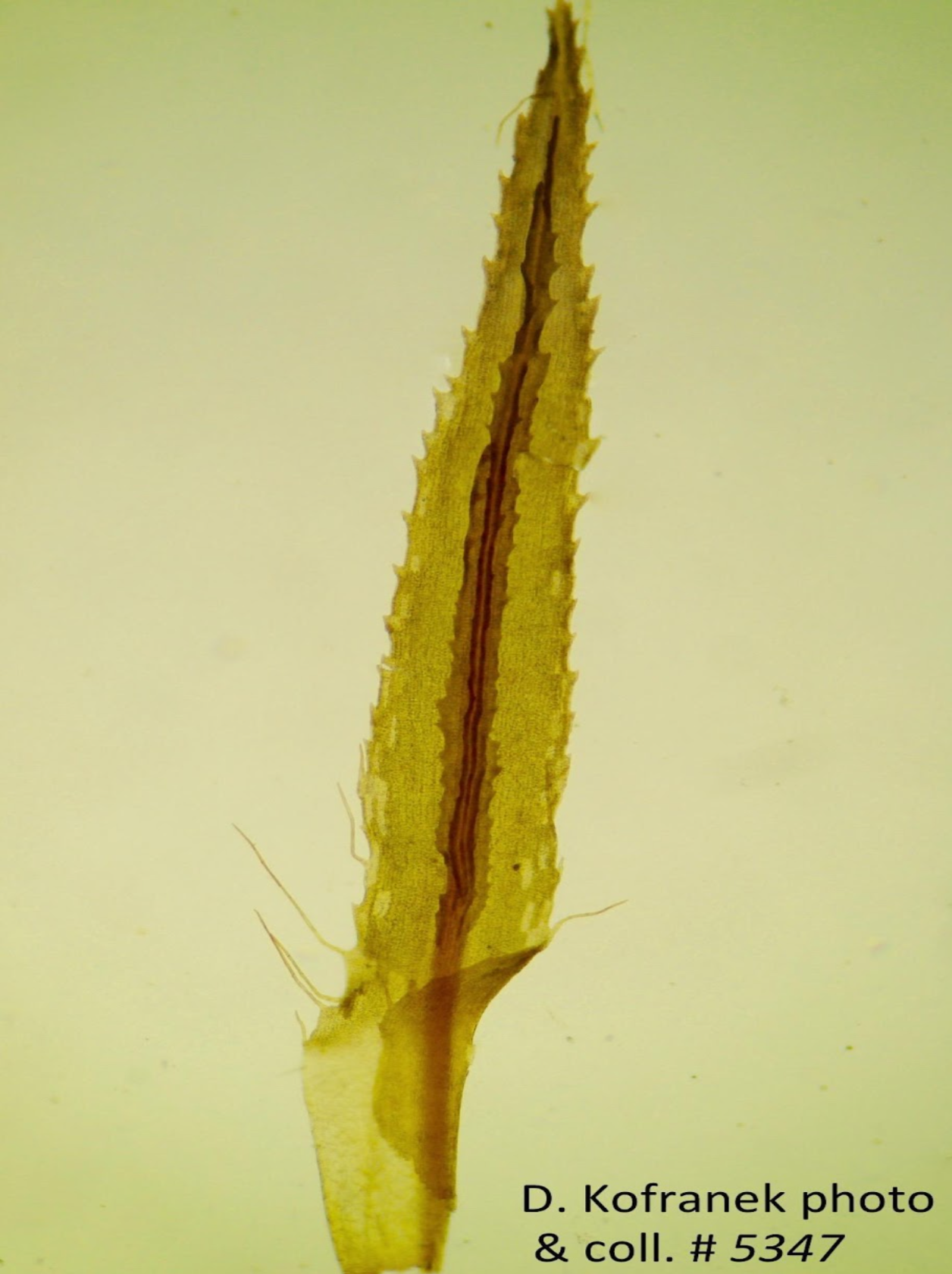
Leaf of Bartramiopsis lescurii showing cilia at base

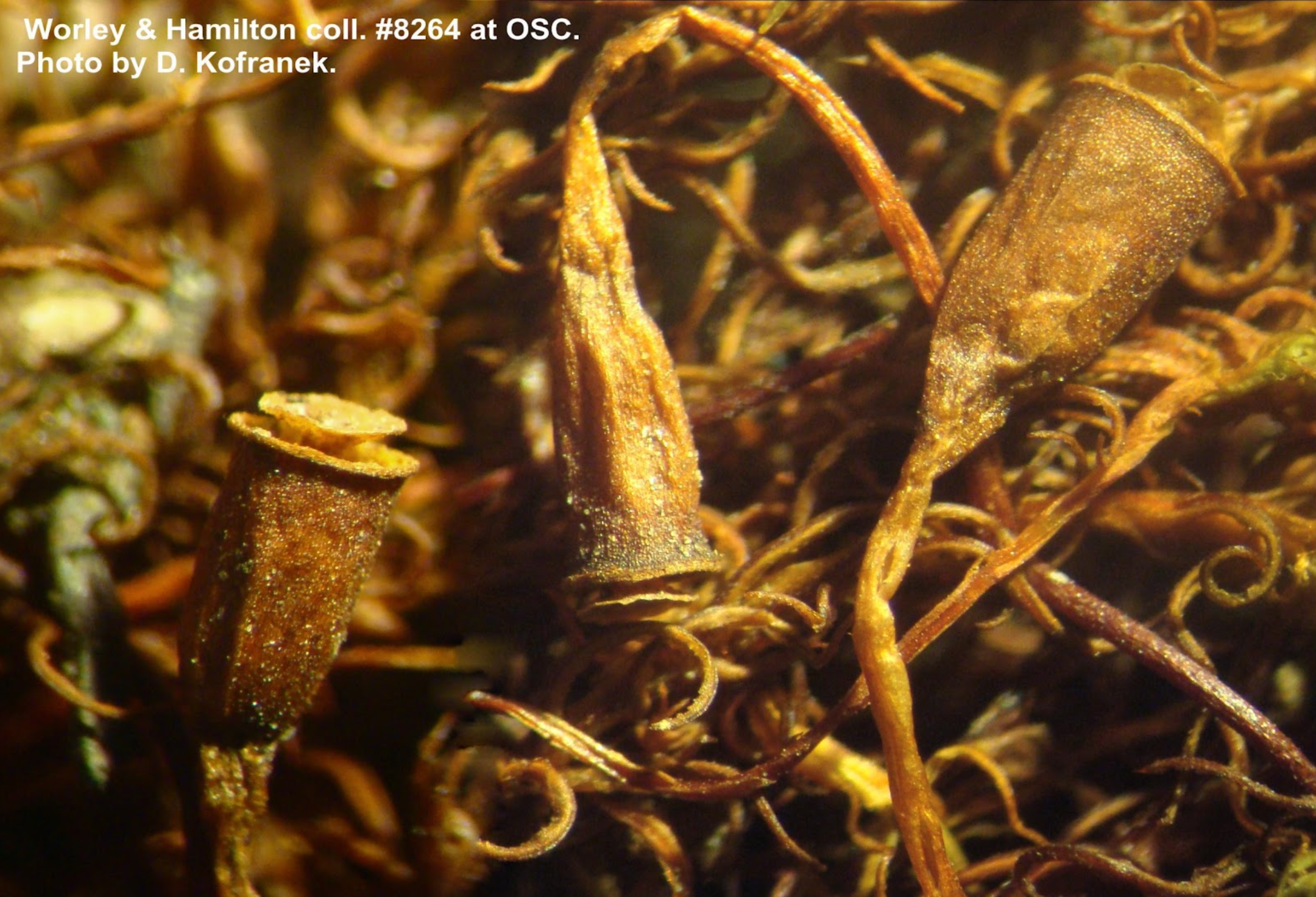
Capsules of Bartramiopsis lescurii
