= Bird's-eye primrose =

Bird's-eye primrose is a common name for several plants and may refer to:

- Primula farinosa, native to northern Europe and Asia
- Primula mistassinica, native to North America
