= Oniongrass =

Oniongrass or onion grass may refer to:

- Wild or feral chives, garlic, or other species in the allium family, particularly Allium vineale, a common lawn weed.
- Several species in the genus Melica
  - Melica bulbosa
- The species Romulea rosea
