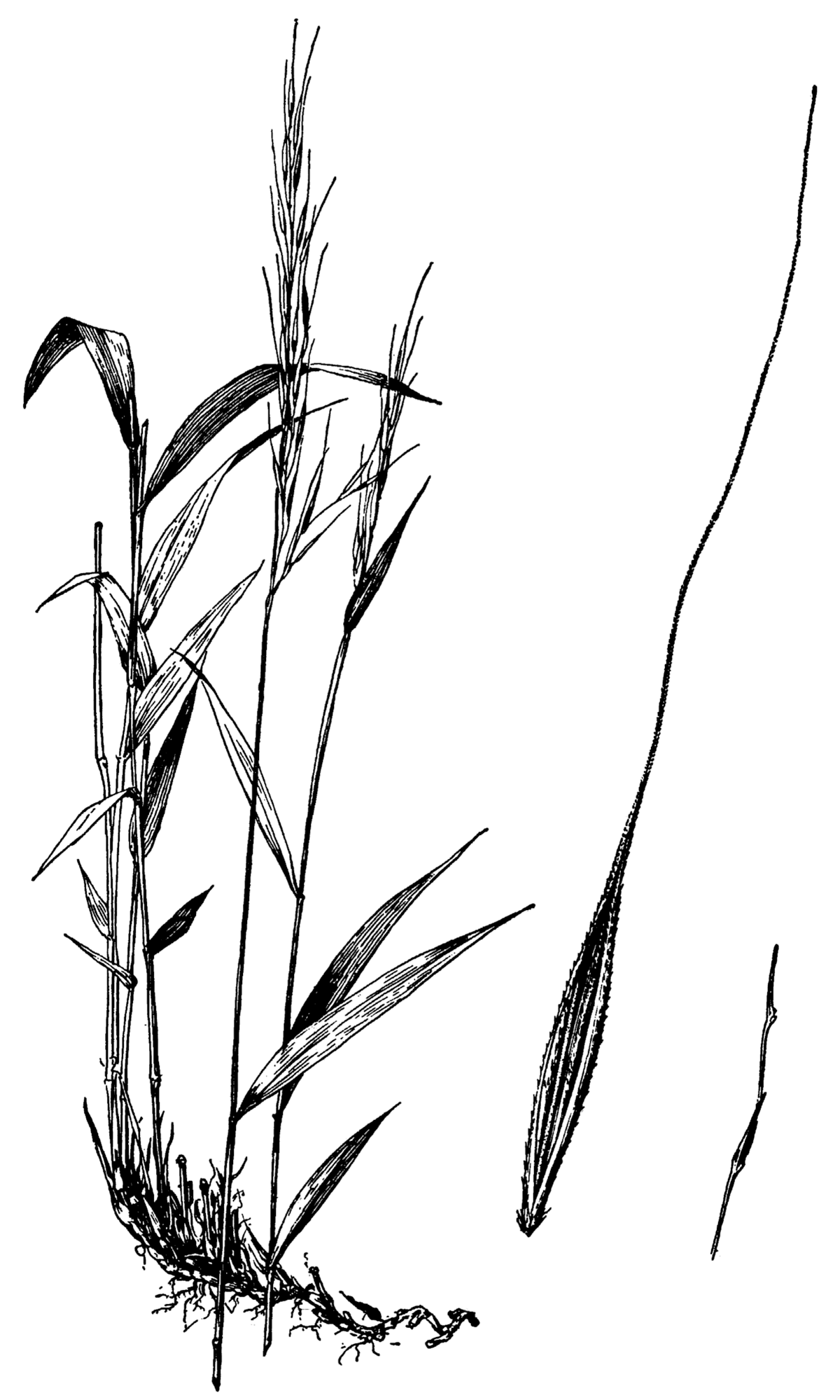
- Brachyelytrum erectum

Scientific classification
- Kingdom: Plantae
- Clade: Tracheophytes
- Clade: Angiosperms
- Clade: Monocots
- Clade: Commelinids
- Order: Poales
- Family: Poaceae
- Subfamily: Pooideae
- Tribe: Brachyelytreae; Ohwi (1941)
- Genus: Brachyelytrum; P.Beauv.

Type species
- Brachyelytrum erectum (Schreb.) P.Beauv.

= Brachyelytrum =

Genus of flowering plants

Brachyelytrum is a genus of North American and East Asian plants in the grass family, classified in its own tribe Brachyelytreae.

Molecular phylogenetic study has indicated that Brachyelytrum is the earliest diverging lineage in the subfamily Pooideae (the cool season grasses), a lineage that includes many of the world's major cereal crops such as barley, wheat, and oats.

Species

- Brachyelytrum aristosum (Michx.) Trel. from Ontario to Newfoundland south through Great Lakes region + Appalachian Mountains
- Brachyelytrum erectum (Schreb.) P.Beauv - from Ontario to Newfoundland south to Texas + Florida
- Brachyelytrum japonicum (Hack.) Matsum. ex Honda - Anhui, Jiangsu, Jiangxi, Yunnan, Zhejiang, Japan, Jeju Island in South Korea

formerly included

see Muhlenbergia Pseudobromus

- Brachyelytrum africanum - Pseudobromus africanus
- Brachyelytrum pringlei - Muhlenbergia diversiglumis
- Brachyelytrum silvaticum - Pseudobromus africanus

== See also ==
- List of Poaceae genera
