= Tearthumb =

Tearthumb is a common name for a group of annual vining plants within the genus Persicaria, notable for the small, sharp spines covering the stems, which "tear the thumb", leading to the common name. The spines are used for climbing, and can puncture the leaves of plants being used as supports.

Species called tearthumb include:

- Persicaria arifolia (halberd-leaf tearthumb) – North America
- Persicaria perfoliata (mile-a-minute) – Asia, introduced in North America
- Persicaria sagittata (arrowleaf tearthumb) – North America
