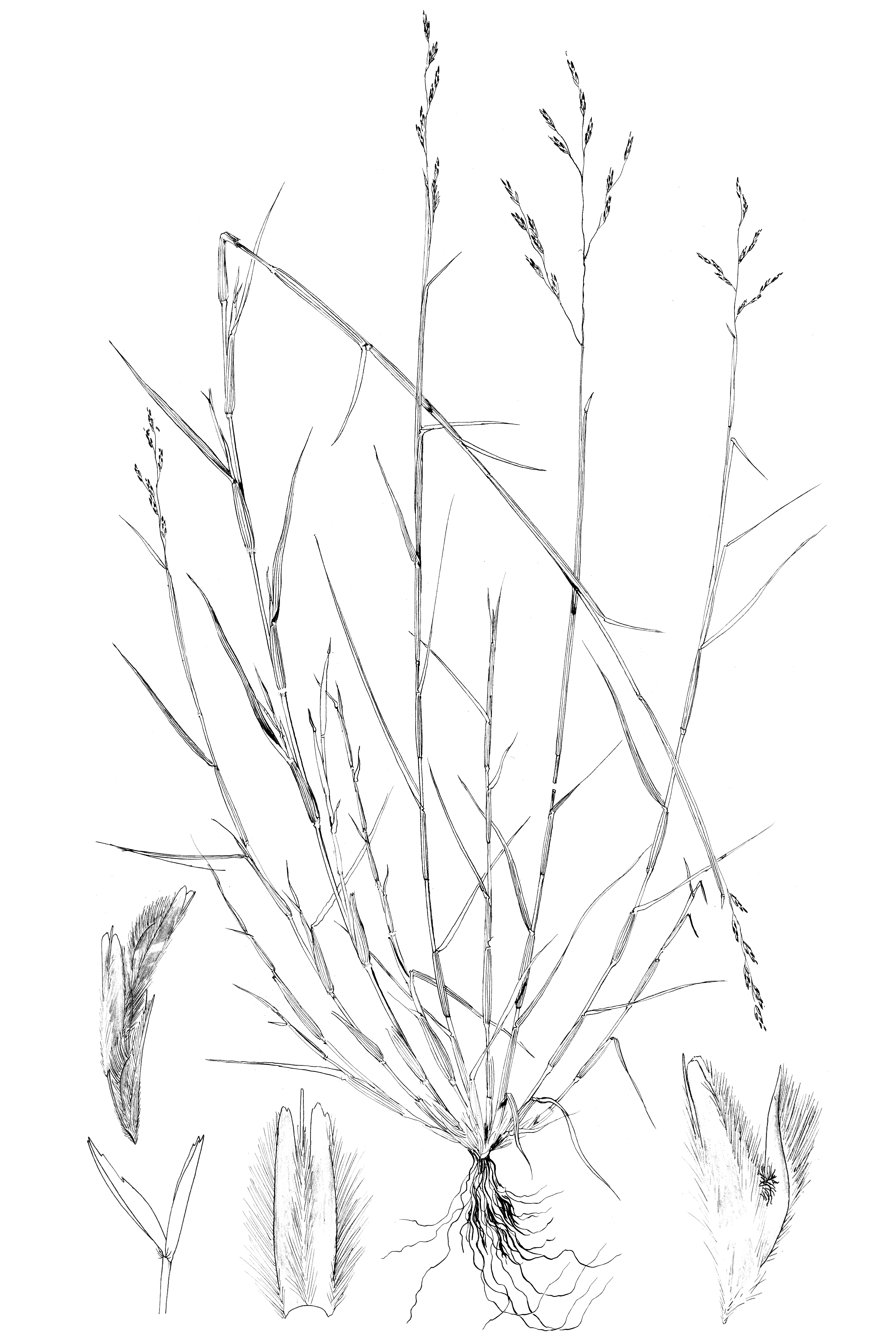
- Triplasis purpurea

Scientific classification
- Kingdom: Plantae
- Clade: Tracheophytes
- Clade: Angiosperms
- Clade: Monocots
- Clade: Commelinids
- Order: Poales
- Family: Poaceae
- Subfamily: Chloridoideae
- Tribe: Cynodonteae
- Subtribe: Gouiniinae
- Genus: Triplasis; P.Beauv.

Type species
- Triplasis americana P.Beauv

Synonyms
- Diplocea Raf.; Merisachne Steud.; Uralepis Nutt.

= Triplasis =

Genus of flowering plants

Triplasis is a genus of North American plants in the grass family. Sandgrass is a common name for plants in this genus. The genus name Triplasis is Greek, meaning "threefold", referring to the triple nerved lemmas.

== Description ==
The plants are slender-tufted perennials or annuals with short, slender leaf blades. Their short and open purplish panicles have few flowers and terminate the culms. Axils of the leaves can bear narrow and cleistogamous panicles.

Species of the genus have few-flowered spikelets and remote florets. The slender rachillas are terete and disarticulate above the glumes and between the florets. The narrow lemmas have three nerves and two lobes.

== Species ==
The genus Triplasis includes:

- Triplasis americana P.Beauv.
- Triplasis purpurea (Walter) Chapm.

The genus formerly included:

- Triplasis setacea - Tripogon spicatus
