= Polygonum fowleri =

Scientific classification
- Kingdom: Plantae
- Clade: Tracheophytes
- Clade: Angiosperms
- Clade: Eudicots
- Order: Caryophyllales
- Family: Polygonaceae
- Genus: Polygonum
- Species: P. fowleri

Binomial name
- Polygonum fowleri B.L.Rob.

Synonyms
- Polygonum allocarpum S.F. Blake; Polygonum hudsonianum (S.J. Wolf & McNeill) H.R. Hinds; Polygonum caurianum subsp. hudsonianum S.J. Wolf & McNeill

Species of flowering plant

Polygonum fowleri, commonly called Fowler's knotweed or Hudsonian knotweed, is a plant species native to the seashores of the northern part of North America. It has been reported from every Canadian province and territory except Alberta and Saskatchewan, as well as from Maine, Alaska, Washington, Oregon, California, and Saint Pierre and Miquelon. It is usually found in gravelly locations along the seacoast.

Polygonum fowleri is a prostrate to ascending herb, often with zigzagged stems. Inflorescences are in the axils of the leaves, each with up to 10 white or pink flowers.

Subspecies

Two subspecies are recognized, treated by some botanists as distinct species:

- Polygonum fowleri subsp. fowleri – shores of Atlantic, Pacific, and Arctic Oceans
- Polygonum fowleri subsp. hudsonianum (S. J. Wolf & McNeill) Costea & Tardif (= P. hudsonianum (S. J. Wolf & McNeill) H. R. Hinds) – shores of Hudson Bay, the Canadian Arctic Islands, and the Atlantic coast of Labrador, Newfoundland, and Nova Scotia
