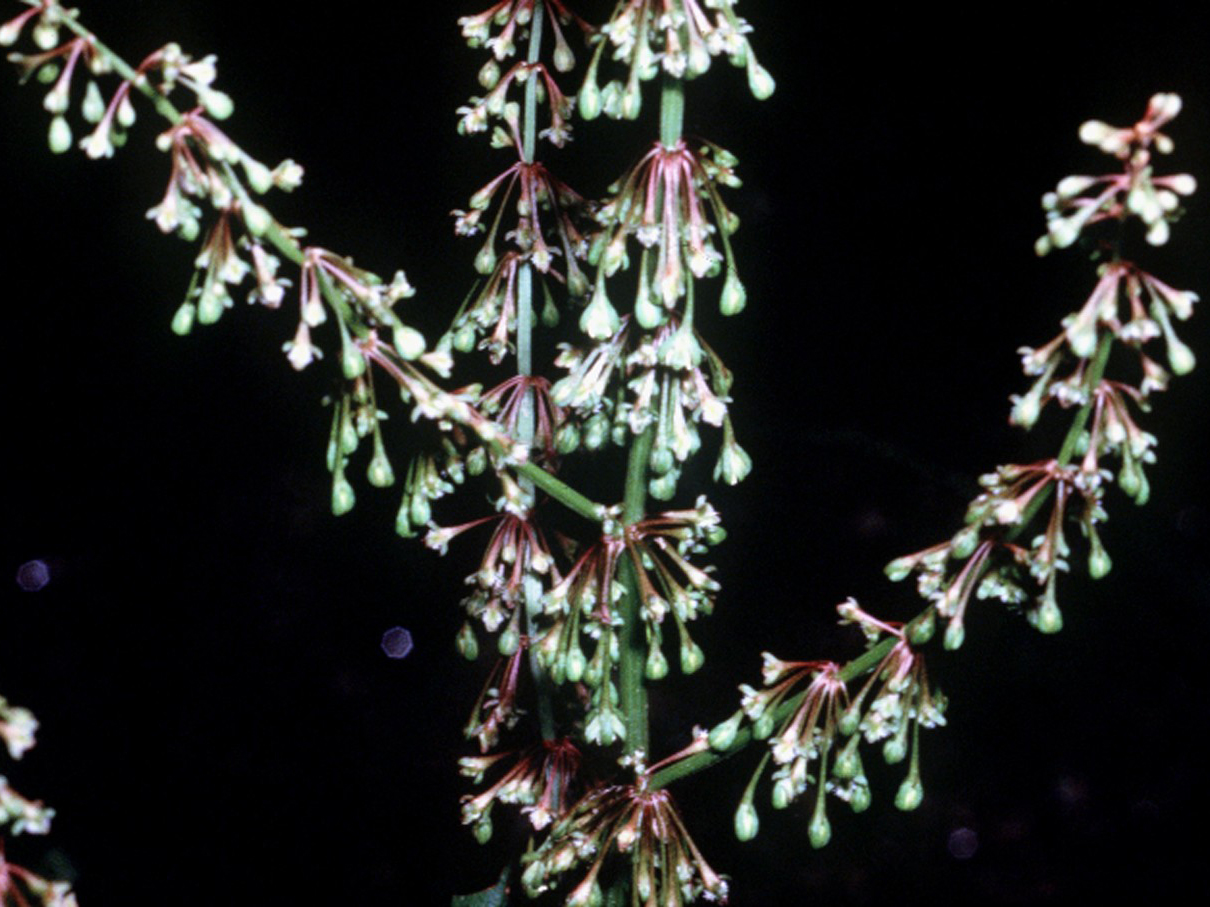

Scientific classification
- Kingdom: Plantae
- Clade: Tracheophytes
- Clade: Angiosperms
- Clade: Eudicots
- Order: Caryophyllales
- Family: Polygonaceae
- Genus: Rumex
- Species: R. verticillatus

Binomial name
- Rumex verticillatus L.

= Rumex verticillatus =

Species of flowering plant

Rumex verticillatus, also known as swamp dock, is a species of perennial flowering plant in the family Polygonaceae. Rumex verticillatus is native to, and almost entirely found in, the eastern half of North America. It is common to find this plant in edges of vernal pools and streams in woodlands, swamps, soggy islands in partially shaded areas, marshes, and roadside ditches.

== Description ==
Swamp dock is a perennial plant about 1–1.5 m (3–5 ft) tall with a central stem usually green in color. The leaves of the plant are alternate and about 6 cm (2.5 in) in width and 30 cm (12 in) long. The petioles of the plant become gradually shorter in length from the bottom leaves to the top leaves. The flowers of this plant have green tepals surrounding six stamens, yellow or white, in the center. The flowers have a droopy appearance and extend toward the base of the plant. The blooming period of swamp dock is usually in the summer and is short period of two weeks. The root system is a taproot and this plant is anemophilous.

== Distribution ==
Swamp dock is found in North America, in Illinois, Iowa, Florida, Georgia and other eastern North American states. The habitat of swamp dock is the edges of vernal pools and streams in woodlands, swamps, soggy islands in partially shaded areas, marshes, and roadside ditches.
