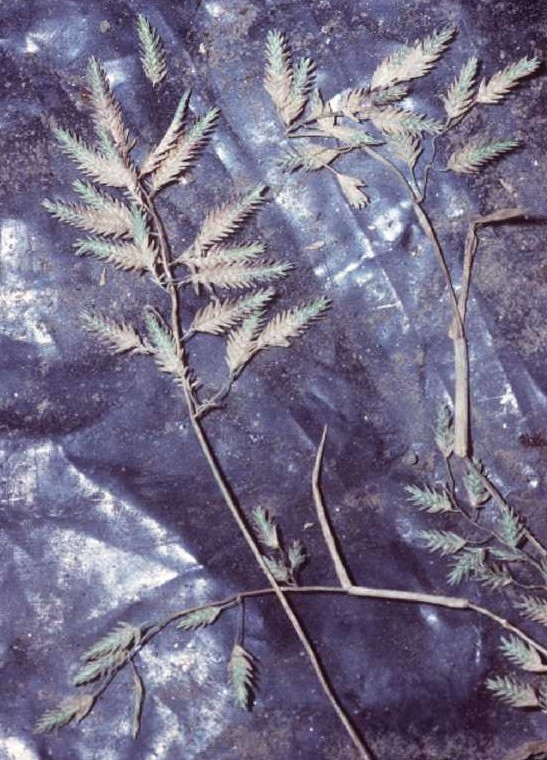

Scientific classification
- Kingdom: Plantae
- Clade: Tracheophytes
- Clade: Angiosperms
- Clade: Monocots
- Clade: Commelinids
- Order: Poales
- Family: Poaceae
- Subfamily: Chloridoideae
- Genus: Eragrostis
- Species: E. hypnoides

Binomial name
- Eragrostis hypnoides (Lam.) Britt., Sterns & Poggenb.

Synonyms
- Poa hypnoides

= Eragrostis hypnoides =

Species of plant

Eragrostis hypnoides is a species of grass known by the common name teal lovegrass. It is native to the Americas from Canada to Argentina. It is found in moist areas near water in substrates of sand or mud.

== Description ==
Eragrostis hypnoides is a mat-forming, creeping annual, rooting at stolons and sending up short erect stem tips to about 10 centimeters in height at maximum. The inflorescences atop the erect portions have small spikelets about a centimeter long which are yellow-green to slightly purple.
