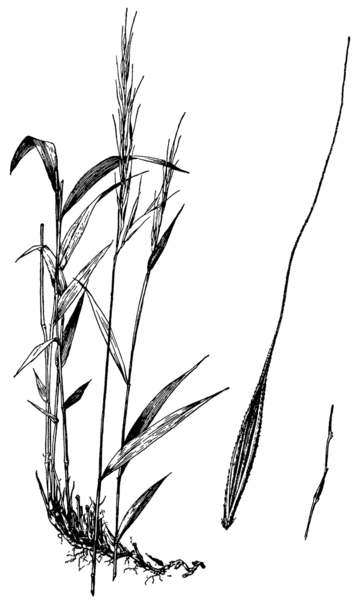

Scientific classification
- Kingdom: Plantae
- Clade: Tracheophytes
- Clade: Angiosperms
- Clade: Monocots
- Clade: Commelinids
- Order: Poales
- Family: Poaceae
- Subfamily: Pooideae
- Genus: Brachyelytrum
- Species: B. erectum

Binomial name
- Brachyelytrum erectum (Schreb.) Beauv.

= Brachyelytrum erectum =

Species of grass

Brachyelytrum erectum, known as the southern shorthusk or the southern long-awned woodgrass, is a perennial grass native to North America. Its specific epithet "erectum" refers to the erect culms of the grass. Its diploid number is 22.

== Description ==
Brachyelytrum erectum grows characteristically erect culms 30–100 cm (12–39 in) tall with pilose nodes. Its hispid leaf sheaths tend to bend backwards, and its very scabrous leaf blades are 3.5–15 cm (1.4–5.9 in) long and 0.6–2 cm (0.24–0.79 in) wide. Abaxial sides of leaf blades are pilose on their veins, adaxial sides are glabrous, and leaf margins are scabrous. The few-flowered, simple panicle is narrow and 5–20 cm (2.0–7.9 in) long, with spikelets 2–4 cm (0.79–1.57 in) long borne on capillary pedicels. The first glume tends to be obsolete or vestigial, and the second glume is aristate. Its lemmas are about 1 mm (0.039 in) and hispid, with hairs up to 6 mm (0.24 in) long. Its awns are 1.3–2 cm (0.51–0.79 in) long, and its paleas are 7–12 mm (0.28–0.47 in) long. The rachilla is present as a slender, naked bristle behind the palea, about half to two-thirds as long. Its anthers are 3.5–6 mm (0.14–0.24 in) long and its caryopses are 5.5–7.5 mm (0.22–0.30 in) long. The grass flowers from June into August.

== Distribution and habitat ==
Brachyelytrum erectum can be found in woods, thickets, and occasionally occurring on beds of limestone or other alkaline bedrock. Its grows in Canada from Lake of the Woods east to Newfoundland and in the United States from western Massachusetts to Iowa and south to Alabama, Mississippi, and Louisiana.
