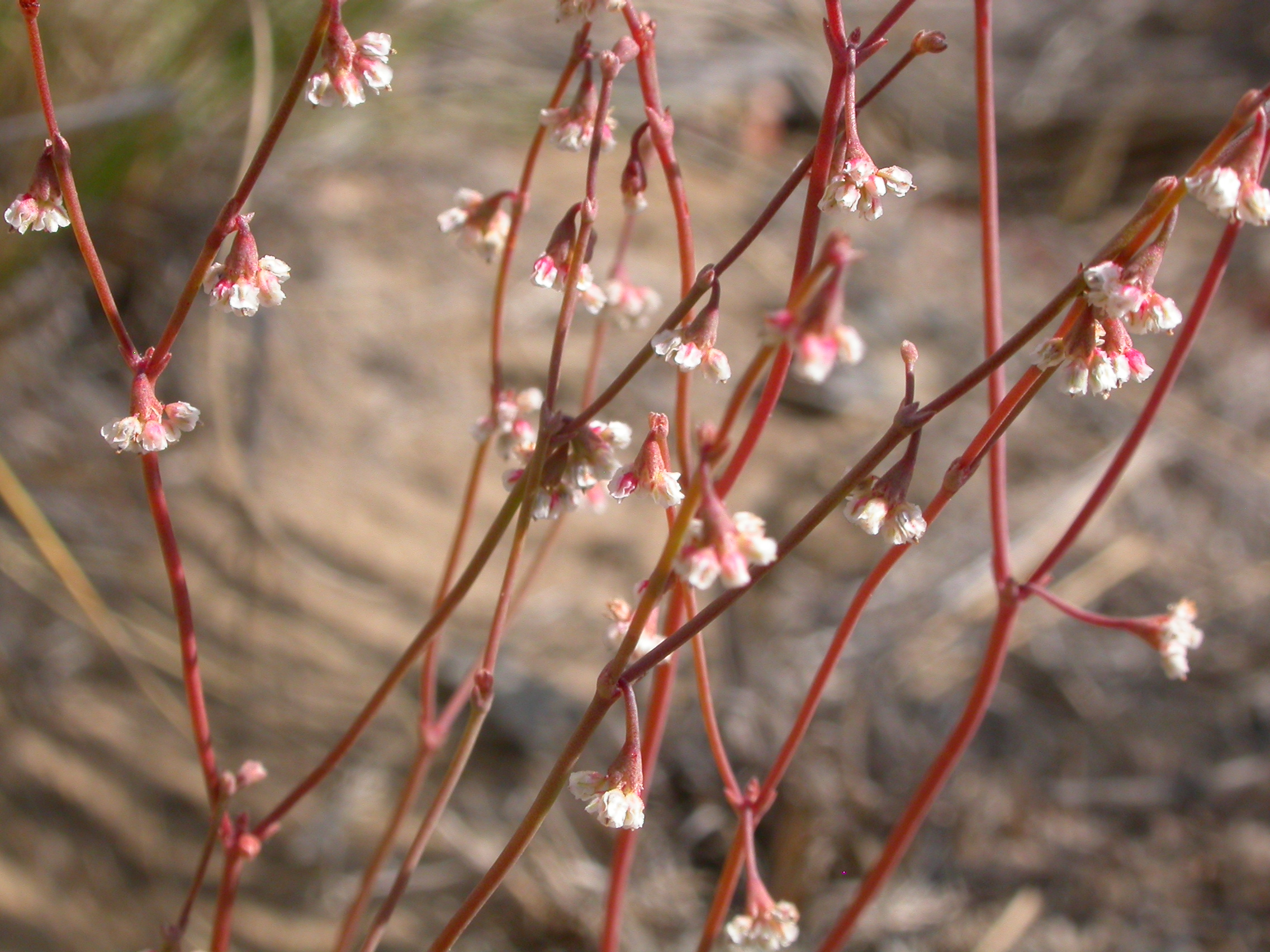

Conservation status
- Secure (NatureServe)

Scientific classification
- Kingdom: Plantae
- Clade: Embryophytes
- Clade: Tracheophytes
- Clade: Angiosperms
- Clade: Eudicots
- Order: Caryophyllales
- Family: Polygonaceae
- Genus: Eriogonum
- Species: E. cernuum

Binomial name
- Eriogonum cernuum Nutt.

= Eriogonum cernuum =

Species of wild buckwheat

Eriogonum cernuum is a species of wild buckwheat known by the common name nodding buckwheat. It is native to much of western North America, where it grows in sandy and gravelly habitat, including woodland and sagebrush. It is an annual herb growing up to about 60 centimeters in maximum height with a thin, branching flowering stem. The rounded, woolly leaves are one or two centimeters wide and are mainly located about the base of the stem. The inflorescence is evenly lined with hanging involucres of flowers. The individual flowers are less than 2 millimeters wide and white to pink-tinged in color.

== Taxonomy ==
In 1848 Thomas Nuttall scientifically described a new species in Eriogonum, which he named Eriogonum cernuum. Together with its genus it is classified in the Polygonaceae family and has no accepted subspecies or varieties, but it has eight that are synonyms.

Table of Synonyms
| Name | Year | Rank | Notes |
|---|---|---|---|
| Eriogonum cernuum subsp. acutangulum S.Stokes | 1936 | subspecies | = het. |
| Eriogonum cernuum var. psammophilum S.L.Welsh | 2003 | variety | = het. |
| Eriogonum cernuum subsp. tenue (Torr. & A.Gray) S.Stokes | 1936 | subspecies | = het. |
| Eriogonum cernuum var. tenue Torr. & A.Gray | 1870 | variety | = het. |
| Eriogonum cernuum subsp. typicum S.Stokes | 1936 | subspecies | ≡ hom., not validly publ. |
| Eriogonum cernuum var. umbraticum Eastw. | 1896 | variety | = het. |
| Eriogonum cernuum subsp. viminale S.Stokes | 1936 | subspecies | = het. |
| Eriogonum cernuum var. viminale (S.Stokes) Reveal | 1968 | variety | = het. |
Notes: ≡ homotypic synonym; = heterotypic synonym
