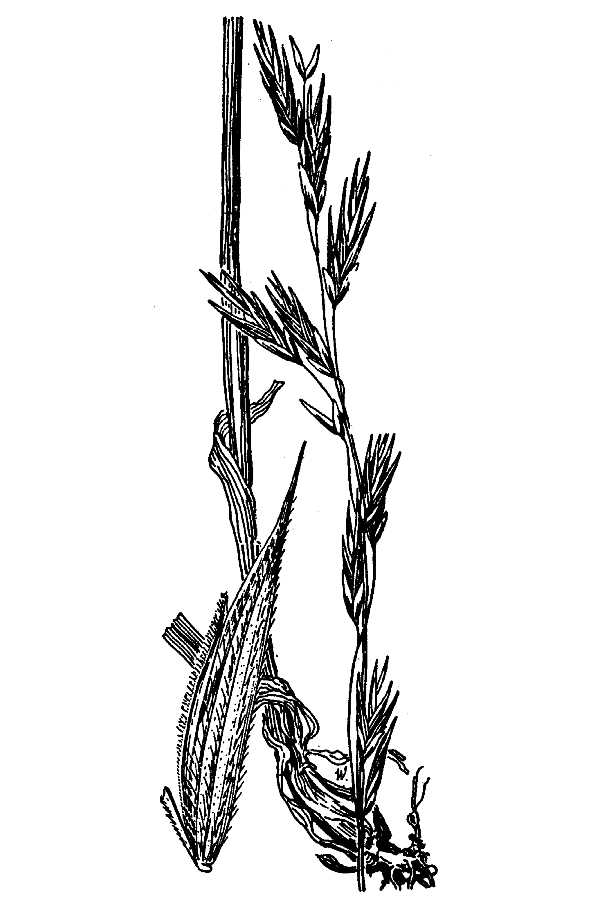

Scientific classification
- Kingdom: Plantae
- Clade: Tracheophytes
- Clade: Angiosperms
- Clade: Monocots
- Clade: Commelinids
- Order: Poales
- Family: Poaceae
- Subfamily: Pooideae
- Genus: Melica
- Species: M. subulata

Binomial name
- Melica subulata (Griseb.) Scribn.

Synonyms
- Bromelica subulata (Griseb.) Farw.; Bromus subulatus Griseb.; Festuca acerosa A.Gray; Melica acuminata Bol.; Melica pammelii Scribn.; Melica pooides var. acuminata (Bol.) Scribn.; Melica subulata var. pammelii (Scribn.) C.L.Hitchc.

= Melica subulata =

Species of flowering plant

Melica subulata is a species of grass known by the common name Alaska oniongrass.

== Distribution ==
It is native to western North America from Alaska to California to Colorado, where it grows in moist habitat, often in forests.

Melica subulata is a main understory member of the Douglas-fir/Alaska oniongrass plant community, a rare plant association that occurs on the southern edge of Vancouver Island on the Strait of Georgia. This plant community once had a wider range, occurring also along the Puget Sound and in the Willamette Valley.

== Description ==
Melica subulata is a rhizomatous perennial grass with clustered onionlike corms at the base of each stem. It grows to a maximum height near 1.3 meters. The inflorescence is a narrow or spreading panicle of cylindrical, pointed spikelets which may be nearly 3 centimeters long.
