= Melica smithii =

Scientific classification
- Kingdom: Plantae
- Clade: Tracheophytes
- Clade: Angiosperms
- Clade: Monocots
- Clade: Commelinids
- Order: Poales
- Family: Poaceae
- Subfamily: Pooideae
- Genus: Melica
- Species: M. smithii

Binomial name
- Melica smithii (Porter ex A. Gray) Vasey

Synonyms
- Avena smithii Porter ex A.Gray; Bromelica smithii Porter ex A.Gray Farw.

Species of flowering plant

Melica smithii (Smith's melic grass) is a species of grass that grows in the Canadian provinces Alberta, British Columbia, Quebec, Ontario, and the US states Idaho, Michigan, Montana, South Dakota, Washington, Wisconsin, and Wyoming. The species is named after Charles Eastwick Smith.

== Description ==
The species have scabrous leaf-sheaths and leaf-blades, with the last one being lax as well. Both leath-sheaths and blades are 10–20 centimetres (3.9–7.9 in) long and 6–12 millimetres (0.24–0.47 in) wide. It have 12–25 centimetres (4.7–9.8 in) long panicle with solitary branches. They are also distant and naked and sometimes 10 centimetres (3.9 in) reflexed. The species' spikelets have 3-6 flowers, are 18–20 millimetres (0.71–0.79 in) long and are purple in colour.

== Habitat ==
Can be found deciduous forests amongst beech, maple, and hemlock trees.

== Threat level ==
In Wisconsin the species is considered to be endangered.
