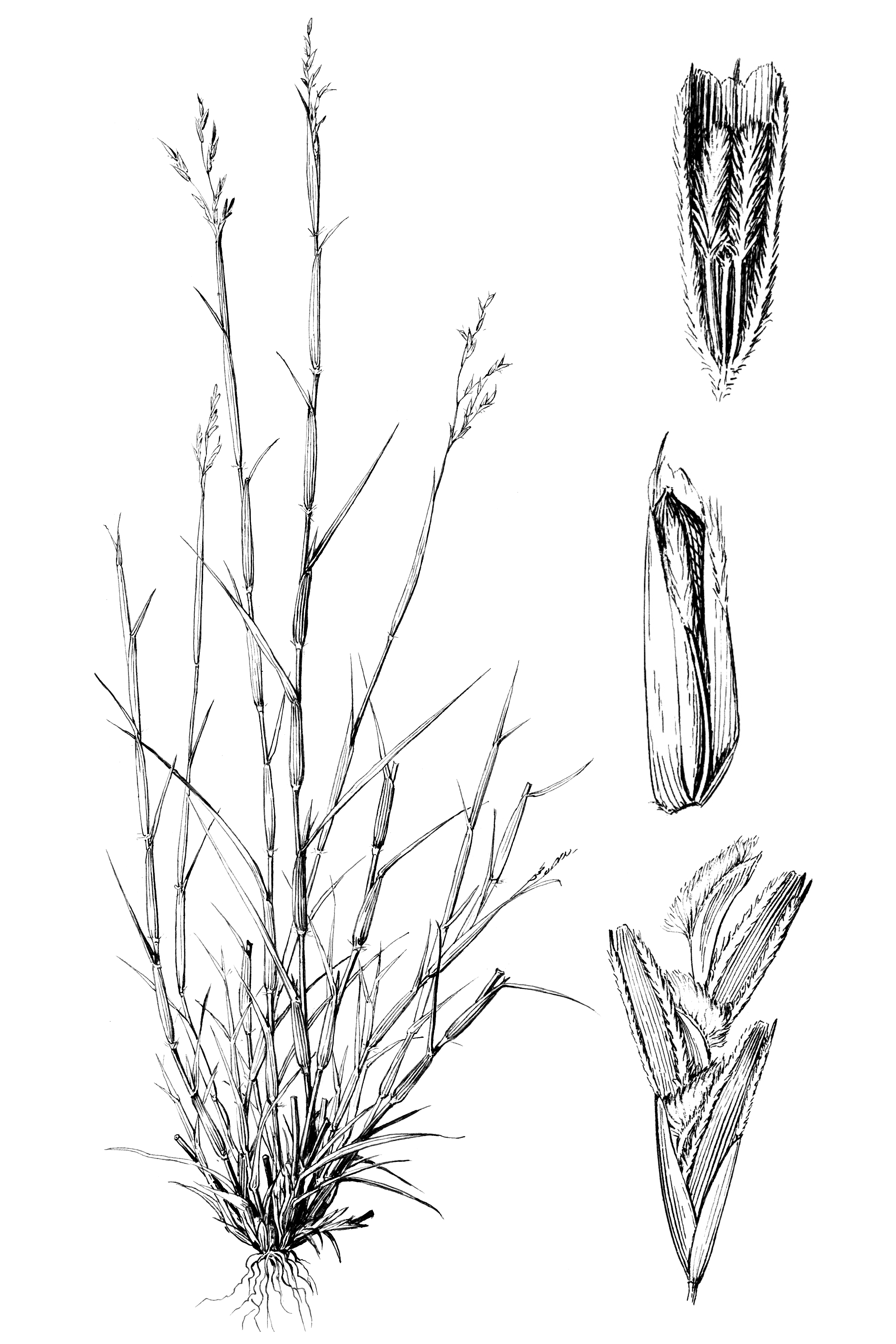
- Triplasis purpurea illustration

Scientific classification
- Kingdom: Plantae
- Clade: Tracheophytes
- Clade: Angiosperms
- Clade: Monocots
- Clade: Commelinids
- Order: Poales
- Family: Poaceae
- Subfamily: Chloridoideae
- Genus: Triplasis
- Species: T. purpurea

Binomial name
- Triplasis purpurea (Walt.) Chapm.

= Triplasis purpurea =

Species of grass

Triplasis purpurea, the purple sand-grass, is a species of grass in the family Poaceae native to North America. The specific epithet purpurea is Latin for "purple", referencing the purple spikelets of the grass.

== Description ==
Triplasis purpurea up grows to 13 dm (51 in) in height. Its wiry, tufted culms are either widely spreading or ascending, with pubescent nodes. The leaf sheathes and small, rigid leaves of the grass are scabrous. The ligule is a ring of short hairs. Its terminal panicles are 3–7 cm (1.2–2.8 in) long, with rigid and divergent branches. The rose-purple spikelets of the grass are 5–8 mm (0.20–0.31 in) long with two to five flowers and have rather short pedicels. The flowering scales are oblong and twice lobed at their apex, with glabrous lower scales. The joints of the rachilla are as half as long as the flowering scales. The awn of the lemma barely exceeds its truncate lobes.

The grass flowers from August to October.

== Distribution and habitat ==
Triplasis purpurea is endemic to North America, mostly throughout along eastern coast but also in the midwest.

The grass prefers the sandy dunes and beaches of the Atlantic coast, Gulf coast, and the Great Lakes, though it can also occur in disturbed areas inland such as roadsides.
