= Melica hitchcockii =

Scientific classification
- Kingdom: Plantae
- Clade: Tracheophytes
- Clade: Angiosperms
- Clade: Monocots
- Clade: Commelinids
- Order: Poales
- Family: Poaceae
- Subfamily: Pooideae
- Genus: Melica
- Species: M. hitchcockii

Binomial name
- Melica hitchcockii B. Boivin

Species of flowering plant

Melica hitchcockii is a species of grass that can be found in Waterton Lakes Park of Alberta, Canada where it grows in a forest about 0.5 miles east of Cameron Lake at the elevation of 5,600 feet (1,700 m).

== Description ==
The species is perennial and caespitose with culms that are 20–40 centimetres (7.9–15.7 in) long. The leaves are cauline with leaf-blades being 12–17 centimetres (4.7–6.7 in) long and 5–7 millimetres (0.20–0.28 in) wide. The membrane is ciliated and is 3 millimetres (0.12 in) long, with the panicle being contracted, linear and 7–12 centimetres (2.8–4.7 in) long. The main panicle branches are indistinct, almost racemose and carry a few spikelets.

Spikelets are lanceolate, solitary, are 15 millimetres (0.59 in) long, and have fertile spikelets that are pediceled. The main lemma have an awn that is subapical and is 10 millimetres (0.39 in) long. It is also have a dentate apex with lanceolated fertile lemma that is 2–2.5 millimetres (0.079–0.098 in) wide and is of the same length as the awn. The species also carry 3–4 sterile florets which are barren, lanceolate, clumped and are 5 millimetres (0.20 in) long. Both the upper and lower glumes are keelless, lanceolate, and are membranous with the acute apex only present with the upper glume. Their size is different though; lower one is 7 millimetres (0.28 in) long while the upper one is 8 millimetres (0.31 in). Its rachilla internodes are covered with soft hairs. Flowers have 3 anthers that are 2–2.3 millimetres (0.079–0.091 in) long.
