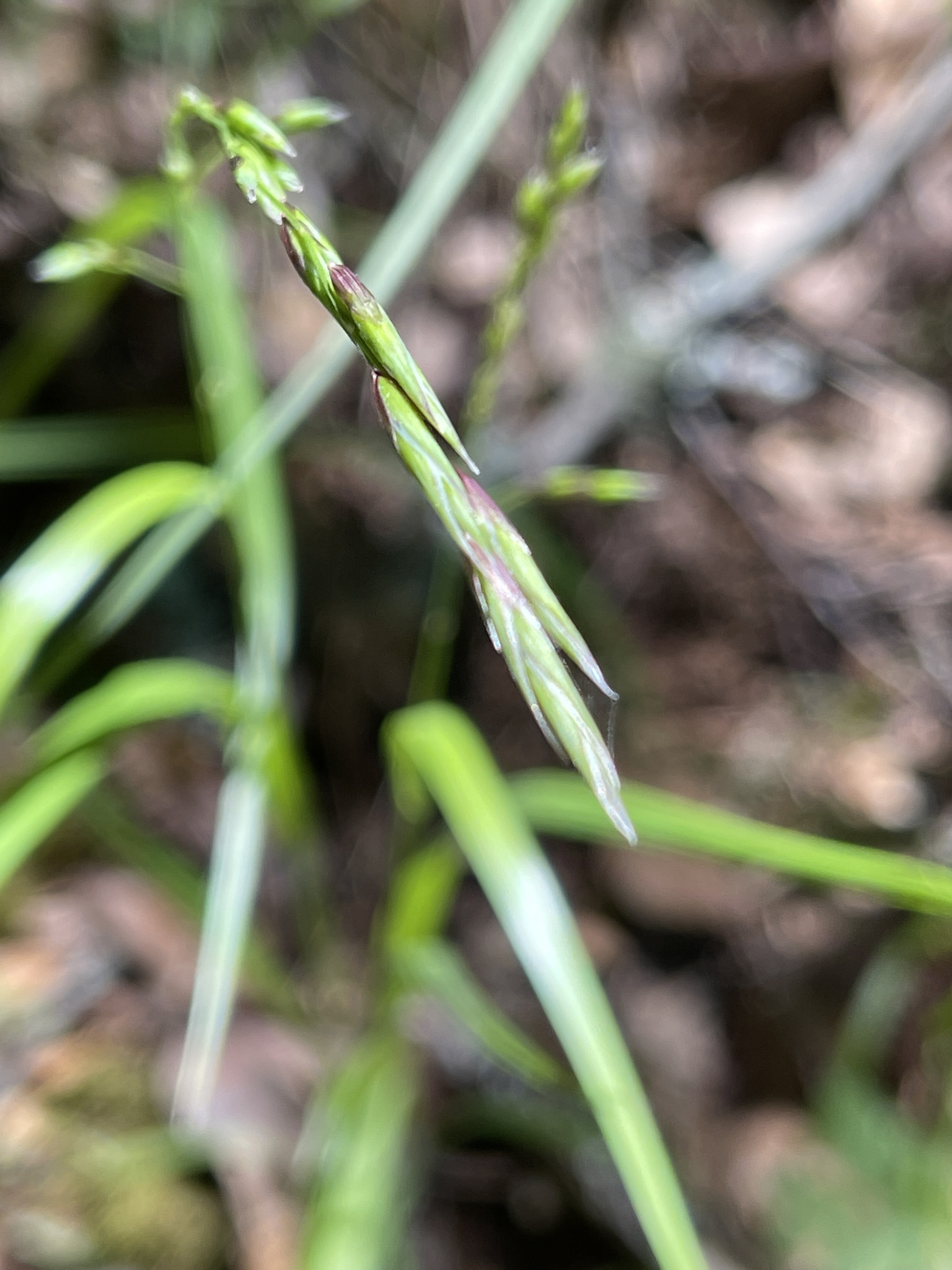

Scientific classification
- Kingdom: Plantae
- Clade: Tracheophytes
- Clade: Angiosperms
- Clade: Monocots
- Clade: Commelinids
- Order: Poales
- Family: Poaceae
- Subfamily: Pooideae
- Genus: Melica
- Species: M. harfordii

Binomial name
- Melica harfordii Bol.

= Melica harfordii =

Species of flowering plant

Melica harfordii is a species of grass known by the common name Harford's oniongrass.

== Distribution ==
It is native to western North America from British Columbia to California, where it grows in many types of habitat, including mountain forests and open hillsides. It is found in the foothills and higher elevations of the Sierra Nevada.

== Description ==
Melica harfordii is a perennial bunchgrass growing up to 1.2 metres (3.9 ft) in maximum height.

The inflorescence is a narrow series of spikelets tipped with nearly invisible awns.
