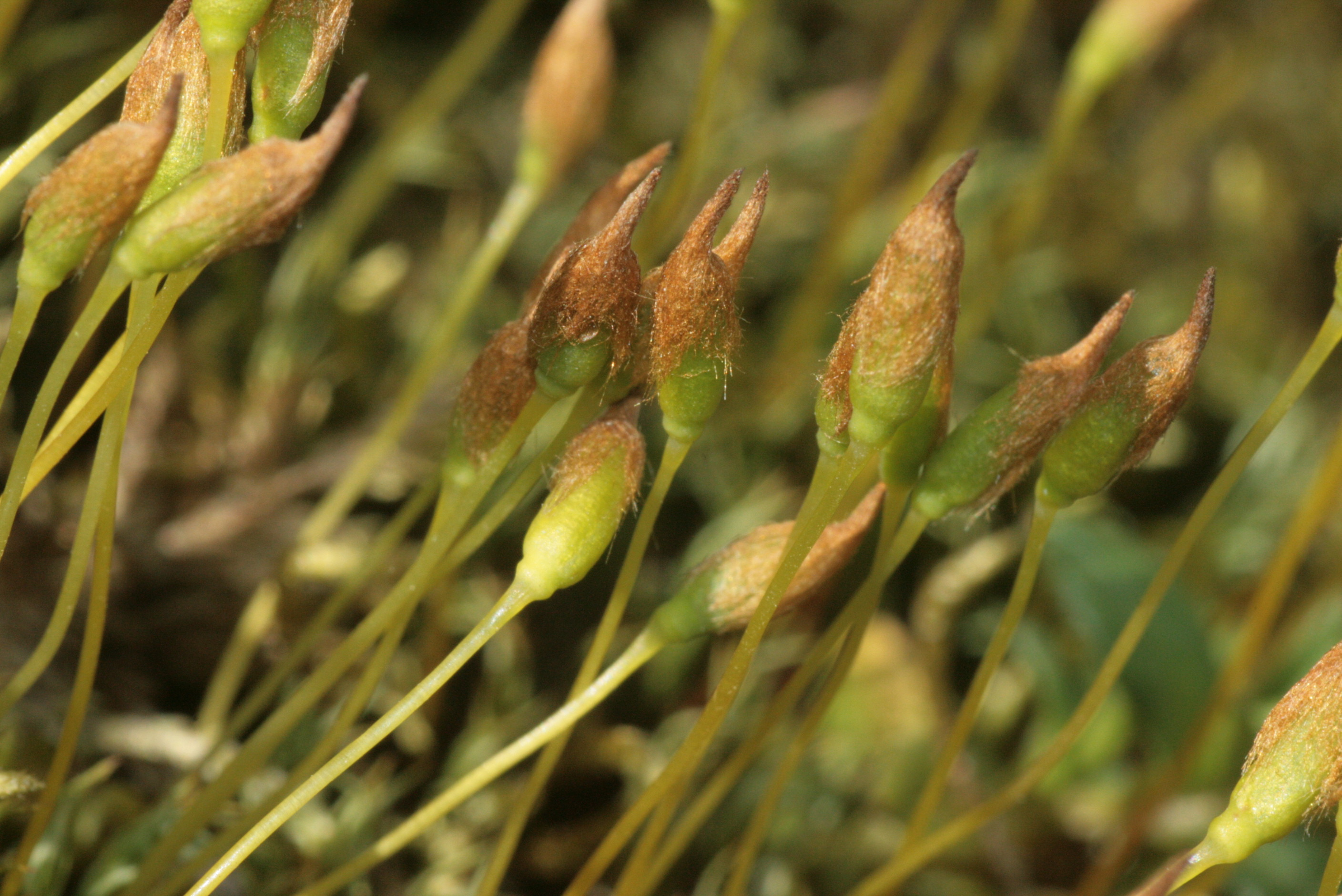

Scientific classification
- Kingdom: Plantae
- Division: Bryophyta
- Class: Polytrichopsida
- Order: Polytrichales
- Family: Polytrichaceae
- Genus: Polytrichastrum
- Species: P. alpinum

Binomial name
- Polytrichastrum alpinum (Hedw.) G.L.Sm

= Polytrichastrum alpinum =

Species of moss

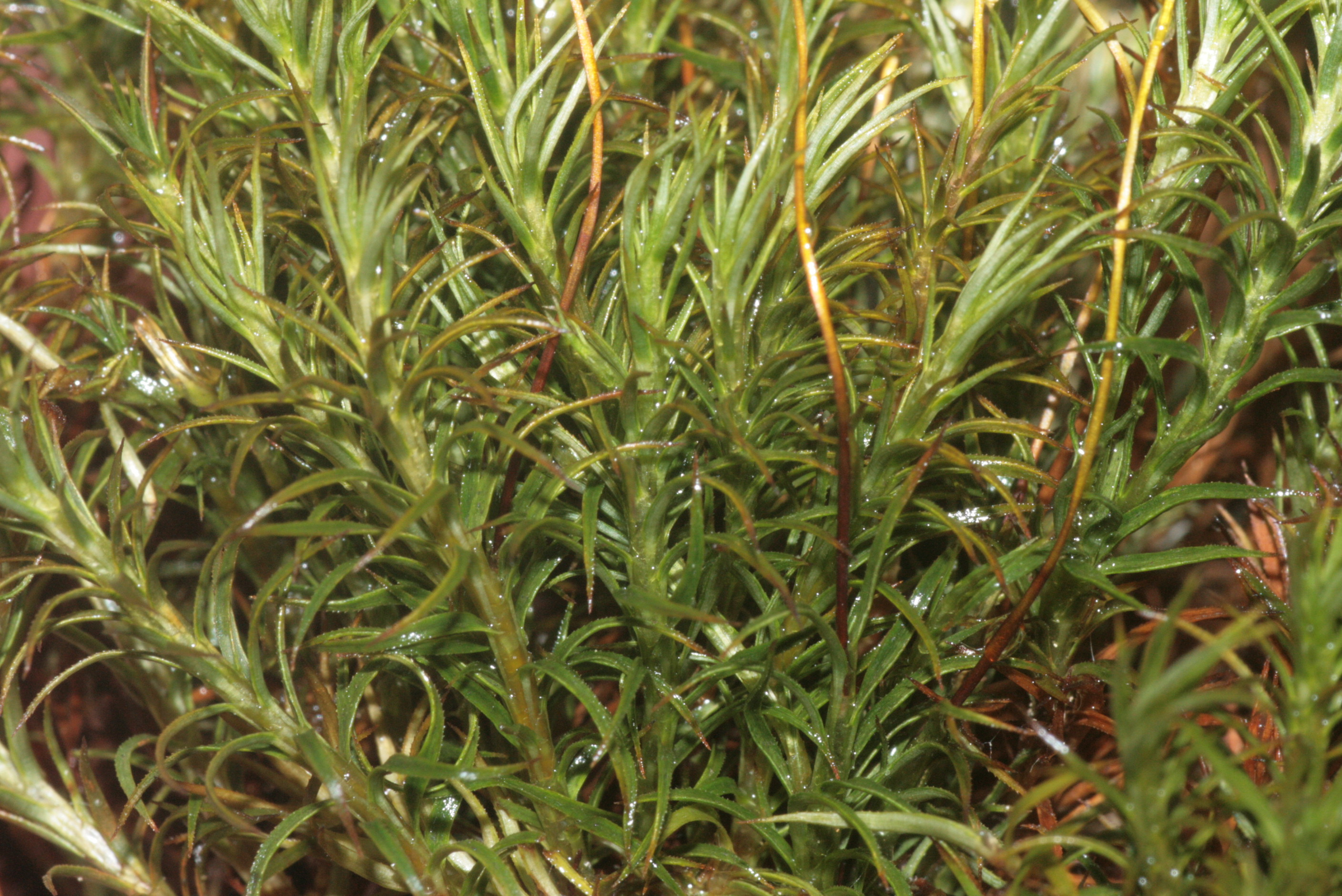
Polytrichastrum alpinum typically grows to 15cm high and is a dioecious moss in the family Polytrichaceae

Polytrichastrum alpinum, also known as Alpine haircap, is a species of moss from the family Polytrichaceae. It is widely distributed and may be found growing among other moss species.

== Description ==
Polytrichastrum alpinum grows to form a loose, muddy green or bluish-green to brownish lawn. Typically, it grows 15 centimetres (6 in) up to 20 centimetres (8 in) high. The upright to erect stems often carry tufted branches of equal length above. In the lower part of the stems, leaves are small and scale-like, but become larger in the upper stem section – usually 7–10 mm long. The broad-oval, yellowish-to-brownish sheath at the leaf base is linear-lanceolate and occupies less than a third of the total leaf length. Leaf edges are serrated, fitting together when dry and bending back and protruding when wet. The leaf rib is cut in the upper part, emerging from the back as a short spike from the blade tip.

The spreading part of the leaf is covered with numerous lamellae (up to 40), these are in the middle of the leaf, 5-9 cells high. At the end cell, the lamella cross section is larger, ovoid and papillose. In the upper leaf, cells are square to rectangular, while lower down they become more elongated and have a hyaline (glassy) appearance.

The moss is dioecious and bears fruit fairly often, with spores maturing in summer. Spores are 14 to 20 μm in size and have fine hairs. The spore capsule is up to 5 centimetres (2 in) long, red below and yellowish above. The olive-brown to black seta (stalk) is slightly curved and tilted and has an elliptical-cylindrical shape. It has a contrasting neck with numerous large, single-celled stomata.

== Ecology and distribution ==
The moss grows in a variety of habitats, from shaded to sunny sites, and on fresh to moist, nutrient-poor, calcareous and base-poor soils. The moss may also colonise stony soil, boulders and snowy grikes above the treeline.

In Europe, it is often found in arctic and boreal regions, while further south it is restricted to montane landscapes and alpine areas. It is also found in Asia, Africa, the Americas, Australia, New Zealand and Antarctica.

== Possible species confusion ==
In some localities, Polytrichastrum alpinum may be confused with Pogonatum urnigerum. Key distinguishing features are that the spore capsules of the Alpine moss are at the bottom of large single-celled stomata; the capsule outer wall has smooth cells; the leaf sheath is much longer than that of Pogonatum urnigerum and the leaf blade is narrower and more spiky.
