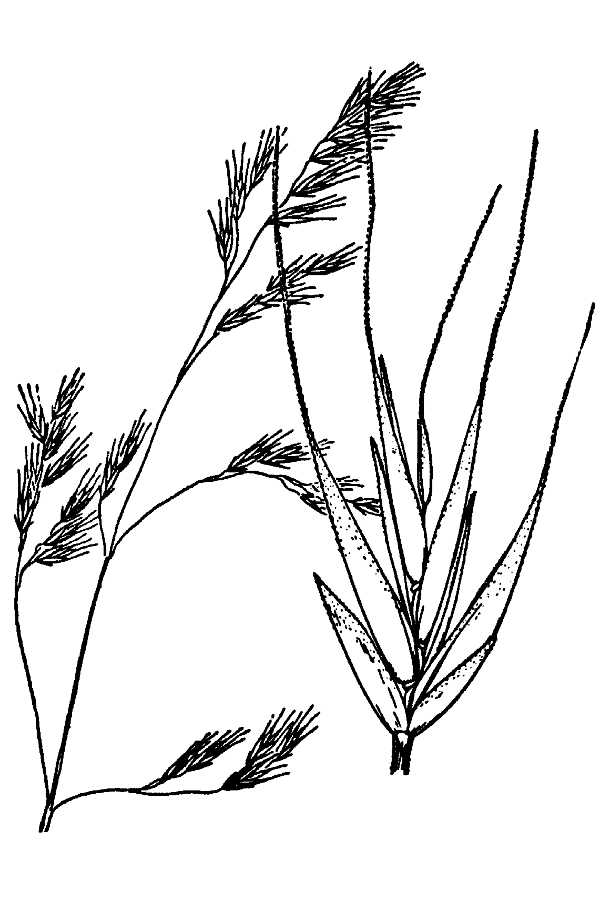
- Botanical illustration from Manual of the Grasses of the United States

Scientific classification
- Kingdom: Plantae
- Clade: Tracheophytes
- Clade: Angiosperms
- Clade: Monocots
- Clade: Commelinids
- Order: Poales
- Family: Poaceae
- Subfamily: Pooideae
- Genus: Festuca
- Species: F. occidentalis

Binomial name
- Festuca occidentalis Hook.

= Festuca occidentalis =

Species of flowering plant

Festuca occidentalis is a species of grass known as western fescue. It is native to much of the northern half of North America and is most widely distributed in the west. It is most often found in forest and woodland habitat. The specific epithet occidentalis is Latin, meaning "western".

== Description ==
Festuca occidentalis is a tufted fescue that lacks rhizomes. The smooth and shiny culms are 50–110 cm (20–43 in) tall. Culms have two exposed nodes and have glabrous internodes. The shoots are intravaginal.

The leaf sheaths are glabrescent and rounded with a prominent midvein. The position of the auricle is marked by a distinct swelling. The minutely erose ligule is 0.1–0.4 mm (0.0039–0.0157 in) long. The basal leaves are capillary and 5–30 cm (2.0–11.8 in) long. In cross section, the leaf blades are 0.25–0.5 mm (0.0098–0.0197 in) wide and 0.3–0.65 mm (0.012–0.026 in) thick, with three large veins and one to five ribs. The basal offshoots are erect, arising from the tops of the pale brown sheaths.

The lax, subsecund, flexuous panicle is 10–25 cm (3.9–9.8 in) long. The panicle has two unequal and strongly reflexed branches at the lower node, with branches 1–5 cm (0.39–1.97 in) long bearing minute trichomes. The three to five flowered spikelets are 6–10 mm (0.24–0.39 in) long. The rachilla is visible at anthesis and internodes are 1–1.5 mm (0.039–0.059 in) long. The unequal glumes are narrow and acute. The lower glume is 2–3.6 mm (0.079–0.142 in) long with one vein, and the upper glume is 3–3.4 mm (0.12–0.13 in) long with one to two veins. The membranaceous, oblong to lanceolate lemmas are 5–6.5 mm (0.20–0.26 in) long, with slender, flexuous awns 2.5–7 mm (0.098–0.276 in) long. Paleas have inflexed sides that meet in the middle, measuring 4–5.5 mm (0.16–0.22 in) long. Lodicules are toothed and lack trichomes. Anthers are 1–2 mm (0.039–0.079 in) long. The ovary is pubescent at its apex.

It flowers from late June into July.

== Distribution and habitat ==
Festuca occidentalis occurs in the northern United States from the Bruce Peninsula to northern Michigan and eastern Wisconsin, and from Montreal and British Columbia south to Wyoming and California.

It grows in dry to moist woods, thickets, and rocky slopes. It grows up to 3,100 m (10,200 ft) in elevation.
