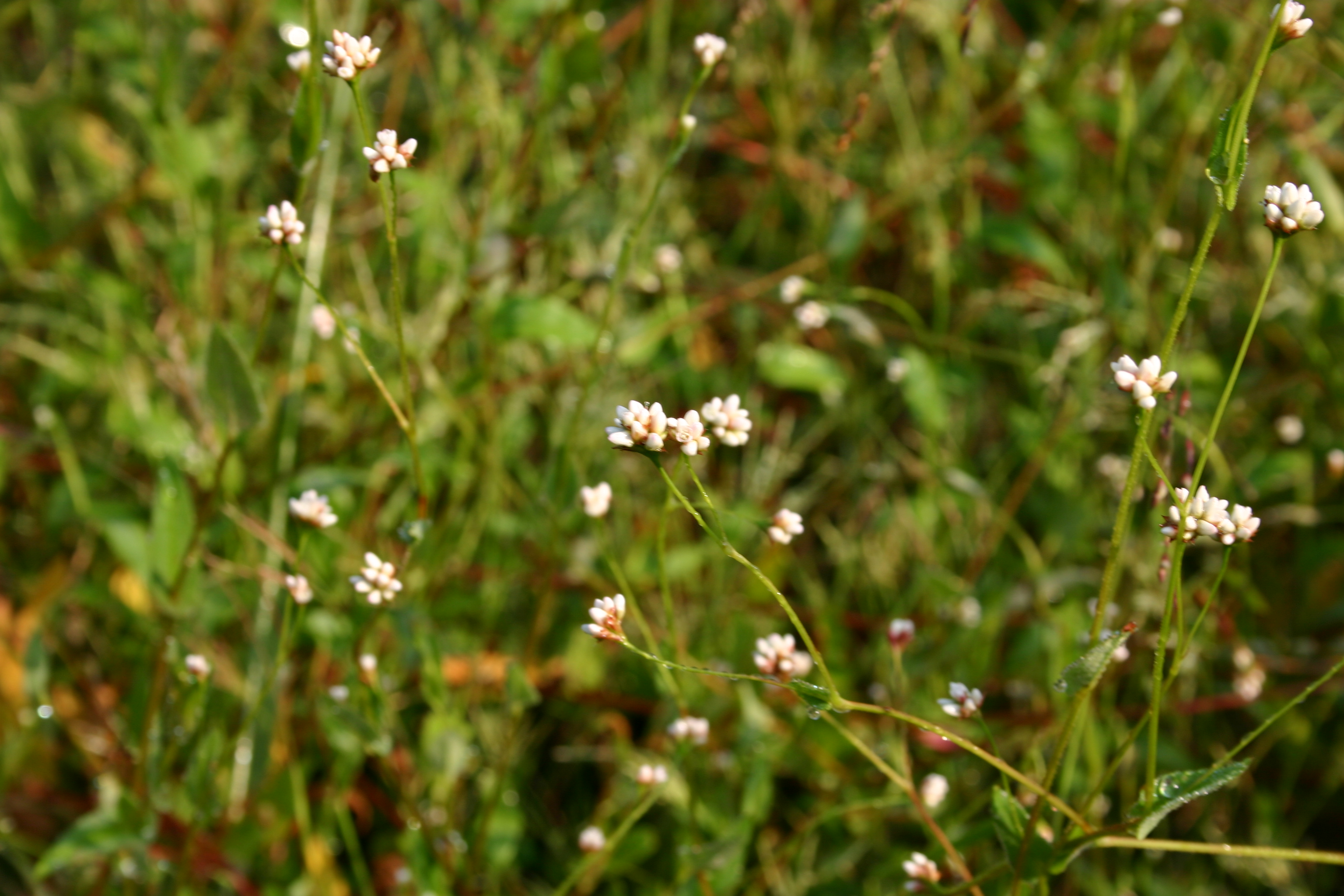

Conservation status
- Secure (NatureServe)

Scientific classification
- Kingdom: Plantae
- Clade: Tracheophytes
- Clade: Angiosperms
- Clade: Eudicots
- Order: Caryophyllales
- Family: Polygonaceae
- Genus: Persicaria
- Species: P. sagittata

Binomial name
- Persicaria sagittata (L.) H.Gross

Synonyms
- Helxine sagittata; Polygonum sagittatum; Tracaulon sagittatum; Truellum sagittatum

= Persicaria sagittata =

Species of flowering plant in the knotweed family

Persicaria sagittata, common names American tearthumb, arrowleaf tearthumb, or arrowvine, is a plant species widespread in the eastern half of North America as well as in eastern Asia. It has been found in every state and province from Texas to Manitoba to Newfoundland to Florida, plus Colorado and Oregon. It also grows in China, the Russian Far East, Siberia, Korea, Japan, northern India and Mongolia. It grows in moist areas along lake shores, stream banks, etc.

Persicaria sagittata is an annual herb up to 200 cm (80 inches) tall, with prickles along the stem. Leaves are up to 10 cm (4 inches) long, heart-shaped or arrowhead-shaped (unusual for the genus). Flowers are white to pink, borne in spherical to elongated clusters up to 15 mm (0.6 inches) long.

== Taxonomy ==
Persicaria sagittata was given the name Polygonum sagittatum by Carl Linnaeus. In 1903 John Kunkel Small proposed moving it to Tracaulon, but the accepted name was created in 1919 when Hugo Gross moved it to Persicaria. Jiří Soják proposed renaming it as Truellum sagittatum in 1974, but this was not accepted by other botanists. Along with its genus it is part of the Polygonaceae family. Among its 61 synonyms it has many varieties, but none are accepted. There are 19 species names that are considered synonyms.

Table of Synonyms
Name	Year	Notes
Helxine sagittata (L.) Raf.	1837	≡ hom.
Persicaria aestiva Ohki	1926	= het.
Persicaria anguillana Honda	1939	= het., nom. illeg. superfl.
Persicaria belophylla (Litv. ex Grigorjev) Kitag.	1979	= het.
Polygonum aestivum (Ohki) Makino	1940	= het.
Polygonum anguillanum Koidz.	1939	= het., nom. illeg. superfl.
Polygonum belophyllum Litv. ex Grigorjev	1932	= het.
Polygonum paludosum (Kom.) Kom.	1936	= het., nom. illeg. homonym. post.
Polygonum sagittatum L.	1753	≡ hom.
Polygonum sieboldii Meisn.	1856	= het.
Tracaulon sagittatum (L.) Small	1903	≡ hom.
Tracaulon sibiricum (Meisn.) Greene	1904	= het.
Tracaulon sieboldii (Meisn.) Greene	1904	= het.
Truellum aestivum (Ohki) Soják	1974	= het.
Truellum paludosum (Kom.) Soják	1974	= het.
Truellum sagittatum (L.) Soják	1974	≡ hom.
Truellum sericeum (Nakai) Soják	1974	= het.
Truellum sibiricum (Meisn.) Soják	1974	= het.
Truellum sieboldii (Meisn.) Soják	1974	= het.
Notes: ≡ homotypic synonym; = heterotypic synonym
