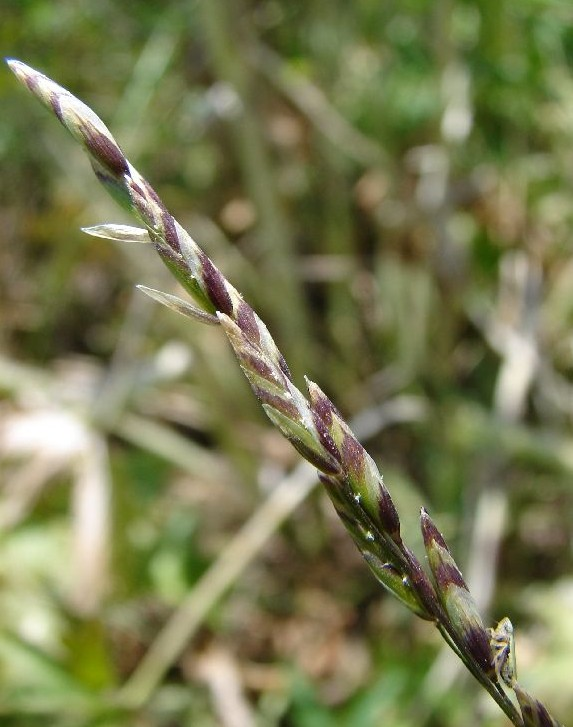

Scientific classification
- Kingdom: Plantae
- Clade: Tracheophytes
- Clade: Angiosperms
- Clade: Monocots
- Clade: Commelinids
- Order: Poales
- Family: Poaceae
- Subfamily: Pooideae
- Genus: Melica
- Species: M. bulbosa

Binomial name
- Melica bulbosa Geyer ex Porter & J.M.Coult.

= Melica bulbosa =

Species of flowering plant

Melica bulbosa is a species of grass known by the common name oniongrass. The common name comes from the onionlike appearance of the corm at its root; it is not related to the onions. It is native to western North America from British Columbia to the Rocky Mountains to California. It may or may not occur as far east as Texas.

Its habitat includes mountain forest and woods, open hillsides, and streambanks.

This is a rhizomatous perennial grass with a cluster of white corms at the base of the stem. The plant forms a loose cluster of stems up to a meter tall. The inflorescence is a narrow or spreading series of bullet-shaped spikelets. The spikelet is banded in purple and green.
