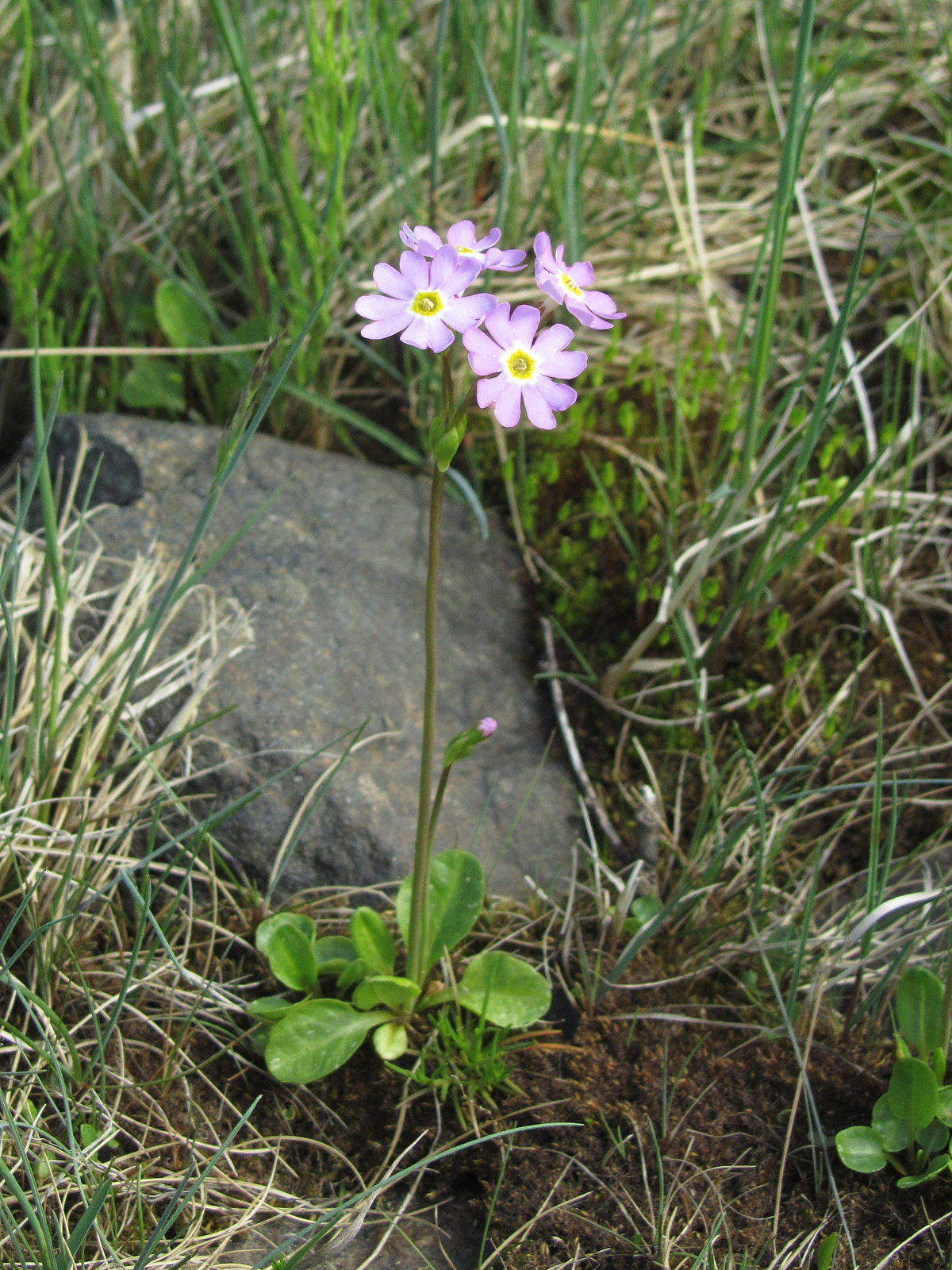

Scientific classification
- Kingdom: Plantae
- Clade: Tracheophytes
- Clade: Angiosperms
- Clade: Eudicots
- Clade: Asterids
- Order: Ericales
- Family: Primulaceae
- Genus: Primula
- Species: P. nutans

Binomial name
- Primula nutans Georgi

Synonyms
- Aleuritia nutans (Georgi) Soják; Aleuritia nutans subsp. finmarchica (Jacq.) Soják; Primula finno-marchica Georgi; Primula integrifolia Oeder; Primula intermedia Ledeb.; Primula intrusa Rchb.; Primula norwegica Retz.; Primula rotundifolia Pall.; Primula sibirica var. integrifolia Pax

= Primula nutans =

Species of flowering plant

Primula nutans, also known as the sleepy primrose, is a species of flowering plant belonging to the family Primulaceae.

== Description ==
Primula nutans is a perennial plant species. Plants possess green, sub-orbicular leaf blades. Leaves are around 2.5cm long with narrow petioles. Flowers are hosted on stalks, which stand tall above the leaves. Blooms can range from 2 - 8 flowers per plant. Petals are pale pink, however the colour shifts from white and then yellow towards the centre of the flower. Flowers range in diameter from 12 - 16mm.

== Distribution and habitat ==
Primula nutans native range is spread from the subarctic to the Himalayas. It can be found within both Europe and Asia within the countries of: China, Finland, Norway, Nepal, Sweden, Mongolia, Russia, Kazakhstan and Pakistan. The species can also be found in the Canadian territory of Yukon and US state of Alaska. It was originally native to British Columbia, but it is now locally extinct.

Primula nutans inhabits habitats such as wet meadows, marshes and coastal refuges. It can also be found growing in areas where glacial movement has created moraine habitats or rocky outwash plains.
