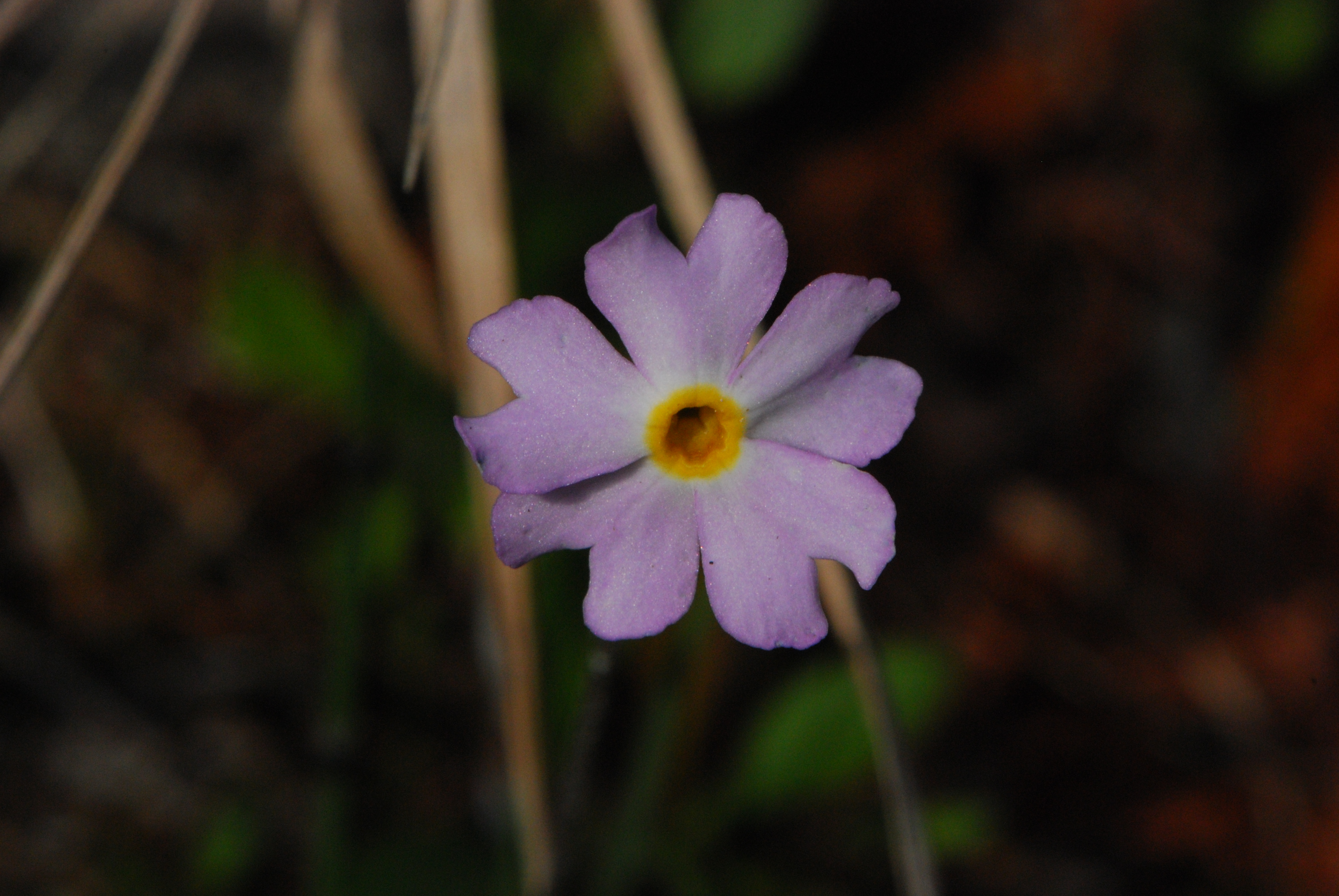

Conservation status
- Secure (NatureServe)

Scientific classification
- Kingdom: Plantae
- Clade: Tracheophytes
- Clade: Angiosperms
- Clade: Eudicots
- Clade: Asterids
- Order: Ericales
- Family: Primulaceae
- Genus: Primula
- Species: P. mistassinica

Binomial name
- Primula mistassinica Michx.

= Primula mistassinica =

Species of flowering plant

Primula mistassinica, also known as Mistassini primrose, Lake Mistassini primrose or bird's-eye primrose, is a flowering herb of the genus Primula. The specific name refers to Lake Mistassini in Quebec, Canada. It is native to the northeastern United States and much of Canada.

Although it is the most widespread species of North American primroses, P. mistassinica is considered rare or imperiled in many parts of its range. Its rarity is often related to its restrictive habit requirements, particularly toward the southern extent of its range. Habitats for this plant include damp cliffs, marshes, bogs, and the shores of lakes and rivers.
