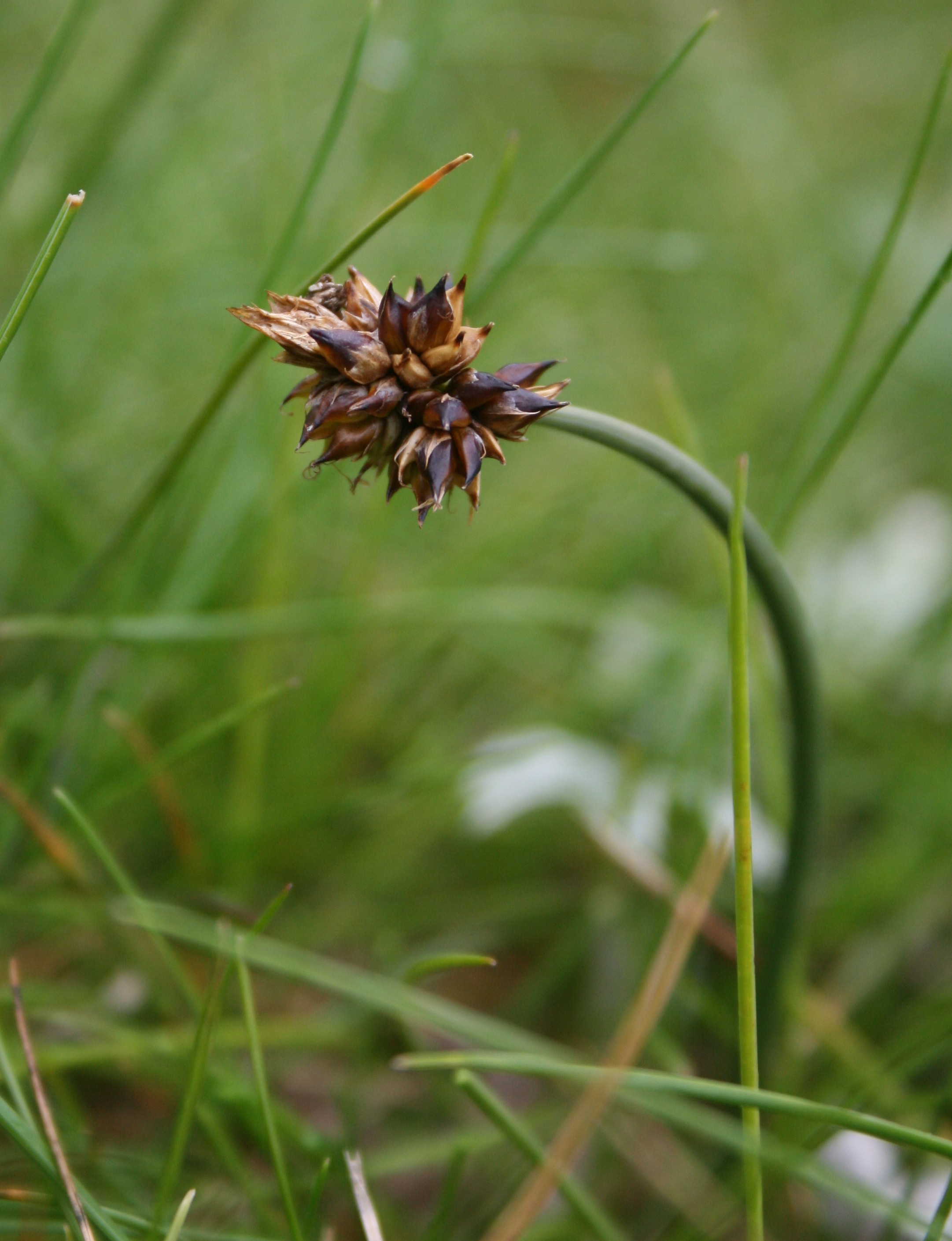

Scientific classification
- Kingdom: Plantae
- Clade: Embryophytes
- Clade: Tracheophytes
- Clade: Angiosperms
- Clade: Monocots
- Clade: Commelinids
- Order: Poales
- Family: Cyperaceae
- Genus: Carex
- Species: C. maritima

Binomial name
- Carex maritima Gunnerus

Synonyms
- List: Carex amphilogos K. Koch; Carex banata Sm.; Carex bucculenta V.I. Krecz.; Carex camptotropa V.I. Krecz.; Carex incurva Lightf.; Carex jucunda V.I. Krecz.; Carex juncifolia All.; Carex melanocystis É. Desv.; Carex misera Phil.; Carex oligantha Phil.; Carex orthocaula V.I. Krecz.; Carex psammogaea Steud.; Carex psychroluta V.I. Krecz.; Carex setina (Christ) V.I. Krecz.; Carex stenophylla L. Thienem. ex Boott; Carex transmarina V.I. Krecz.; Caricina incurva (Lightf.) St.-Lag.; Olotrema juncifolia (All.) Raf.; Rhaptocalymna incurva (Lightf.) Fedde & J.Schust.; Vignea incurva (Lightf.) Rchb.; Vignea maritima (Gunnerus) Rchb.

= Carex maritima =

Species of plant

Carex maritima (syn. C. incurva), aptly named curved sedge in English, is a species of flowering plant in the sedge family which occurs throughout the subarctic regions and in mountains as far south as North Africa. It grows in sandy and grassy places on beaches or eroding mountainsides, in populations that fluctuate dramatically according to the stability of the vegetation. It is considered rare and threatened towards the southern edge of its range.

== Description ==
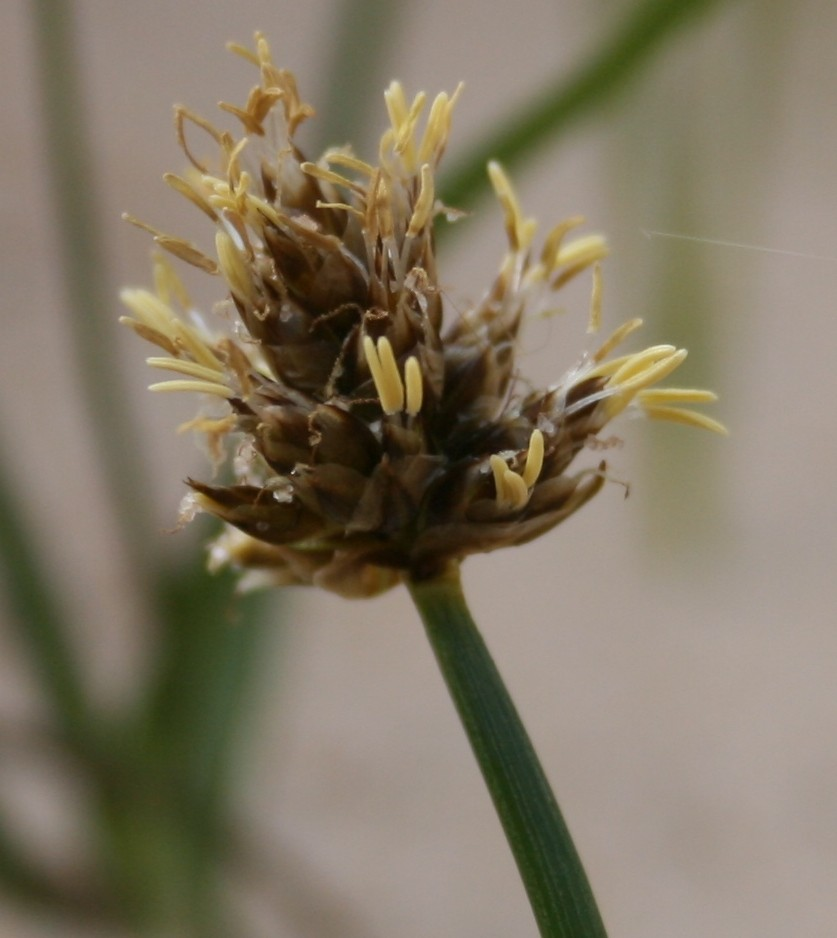
Male flowers at anthesis

Curved sedge is a perennial herbaceous plant with long, branched, fibrous rhizomes giving rise to solitary or loosely tufted shoots. The vegetative stems are very short and look more like a group of leaves emerging from the ground. The fertile stems are tough, almost terete (circular in cross-section), 5-18 cm long, and often rather curved, with several (4-10) leaves arising from the lower half. The leaves are up to 15 cm long by 2 mm wide, rather stiff, often inrolled on the margins and slightly twisted, tapering to a fine, trigonous (triangular in cross-section) tip. The ligule, at the junction between the leaf sheath and blade, is short (1 mm) and rounded. The whole plant is entirely glabrous and the aerial parts are a dull green colour.

Flowering occurs in early summer, in April or May in Scotland. The inflorescence consists of a single round head about 1.5 cm in diameter, containing 4-8 spikes of several flowers, the upper ones being inconspicuous and containing only male flowers and the lower ones being female with occasionally one male at the tip. The bracts at the base of each spike are inconspicuous, being similar to the glumes.

The female flowers consist of a brown glume about 4 mm long with a pale midrib and narrow hyaline (papery) margins and a pointed tip, and a utricle (nut) about the same size, with a bifid tip and two stigmas. The utricles swell up at maturity and darken almost to black, containing a biconvex brown seed. The male flowers have a brown glume about 4 mm long and three anthers borne on long filaments.

The male flowers open before the females, using a mechanism known as protandry to avoid self-pollination; the pollen being dispersed by wind.

== Taxonomy ==
The scientific name was coined by Johan Ernst Gunnerus, a Norwegian bishop and amateur botanist who published this name in his Flora Norvegica, vol. 2 (1776). Here, he wrote: "Carex maritima, med enkle, nærmest runde aks; dekkskjell ovale og kortnebbet. På norsk Fjærestar. Vokser på sandstrender i Norge ifølge Oeder" (curved sedge, with simple, almost round spikes, oval utricles with short beaks. In Norwegian, Fjaerestar. Grows on sandy beaches in Norway, according to Oeder).

The "Oeder" mentioned here was Georg Christian Oeder, a Danish doctor who launched a monumental project of botanical illustration, Flora Danica, in 1761, which lasted 123 years. Carex maritima is illustrated in vol. 2, plate 432, in 1769, and this would have provided the first record and the name except that the picture is unlabelled. Its scientific name, therefore, is Carex maritimus Gunnerus. Sometimes the authority is written "Gunn." but the correct standard form is "Gunnerus", written in full. It is one of 15 plants attributed to Johan Gunnerus, all of which were published in Fl. Norvegica.

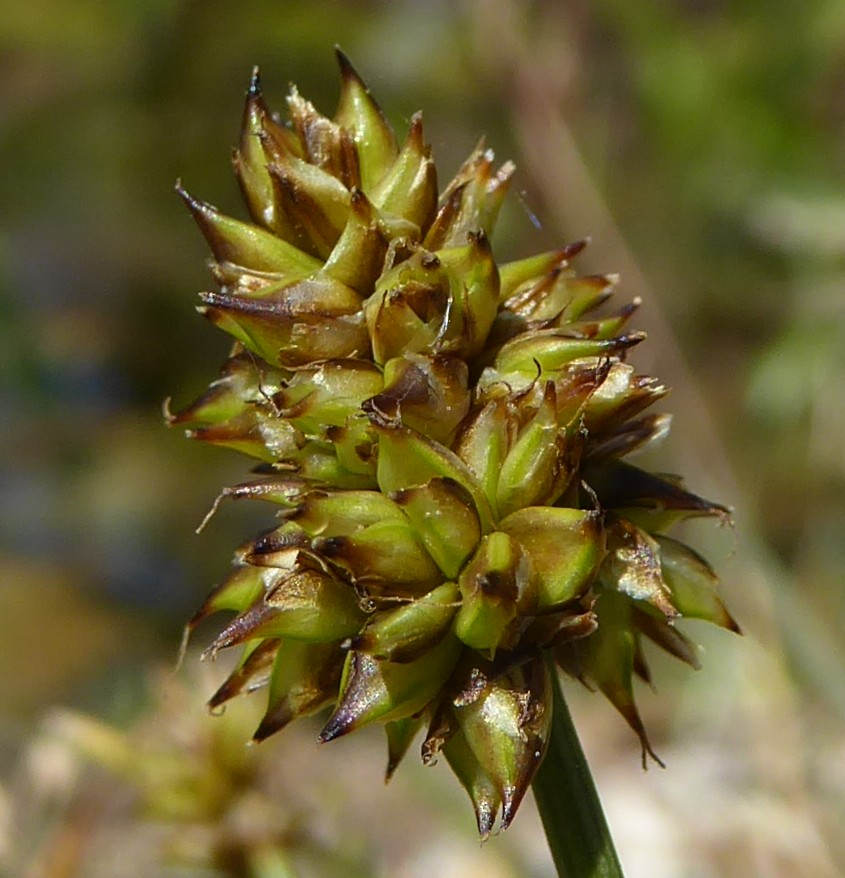
Ripening fruits

Carex maritima has a chromosome number of 2n = 60. Although it is quite variable and a number of other treatments have been proposed, it has no currently accepted subspecies. It is not known to hybridise with any other plants.

== Distribution and status ==
Curved sedge has a circumpolar distribution in the northern hemisphere, throughout the northern parts of Alaska, Canada, Scandinavia and Russia, with southern outliers in the Alps and possibly the Himalayas (although the latter may be based on just one specimen).

The Global Biodiversity Information Facility has one record for the Himalayas, a specimen collected in 1972 by Hiroo Kanai and Samar Bahadur Balla at "Lama Chungbu" (= Olangchung Gola, Nepal, according to Google Maps), at an altitude of 4,300 m.

In America, it is a common plant in Alaska and Canada, but it may not extend as far south as the Lower 48. It was listed as provisionally present in New England in 1902 but there are not many recent records. The New York Botanical Garden has specimens labelled "Carex maritima" from as far south as Texas, but they have been misidentified.

Some sources also describe it as occurring in South America, specifically in Peru and Chile. One theory is that it arrived in South America as a result of a long-distance dispersal event in the late Pleistocene, around 250,000 years ago. The South American plants have been shown to form a subset within the genetic variation of the northern hemisphere populations. However, some more recent studies have suggested that the South American plants may be a different species, Carex melanocystis É. Desv., as it seems to be more closely related to some other species of sedge.

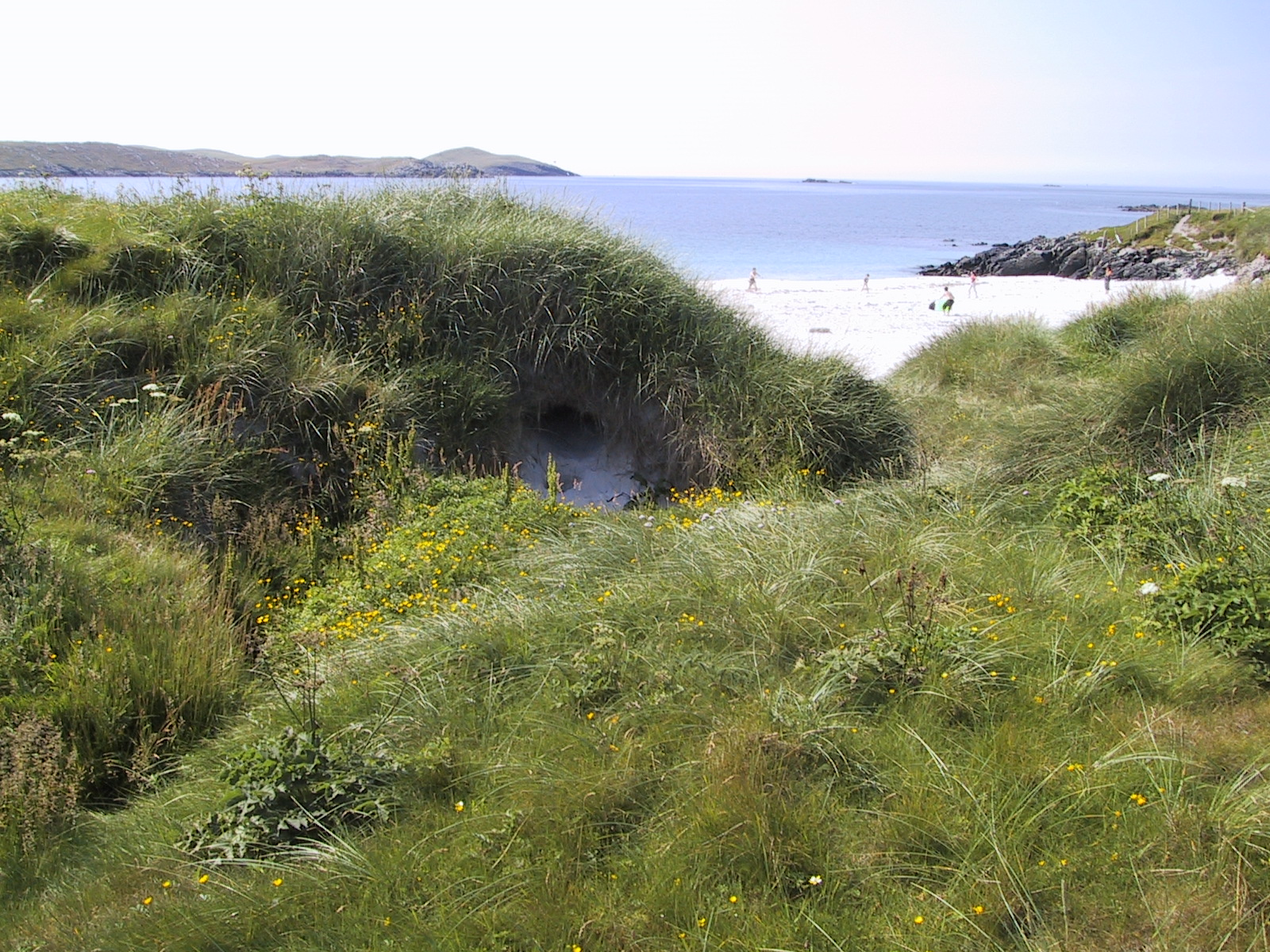
Curved sedge grows in dune grassland at the Sands of Meal, Shetland

Although it is not rare or threatened globally, curved sedge is considered at risk in places on the southern edges of its distribution. In Switzerland, it is classed as VU (vulnerable), while in Britain it is considered EN (endangered) or, in England, (incorrectly) as extinct.

There was speculation that it could be close to extinction in England as a result of climate change and other factors, such as the development of golf courses on dune systems, but it still persists at Lindisfarne in Northumbria.

== Habitat and ecology ==
There are two distinct habitats where curved sedge grows: at sea level and on high mountains, always in places where there is a strong influence of water on bare sand. On beaches, it has been described as growing in damp sand, at the mouths of streams, in dune slacks and on turf beside rock pools. In Scottish machair - which accounts for most British populations - this is habitat B1.4 northern fixed grey dunes in the EUNIS habitat system, which corresponds to various sand dune grasslands in the British NVC. On the Varanger Peninsula in northern Norway it has been recorded in grassy upper saltmarsh dominated by Calamagrostis stricta, Festuca rubra and Poa pratensis, with a carpet of Sanionia uncinata. This is EUNIS habitat MA223T, Fenno-Scandian Calamagrostis stricta-sedge swards.

In montane regions such as the Alps, curved sedge is associated with thin, sandy or sometimes argillaceous or peaty soils around springs or alongside watercourses, in association with plants such as Carex microglochin, C. bicolor and Juncus arcticus in EUNIS habitat 7240 Alpine pioneer formations of Caricion bicoloris-atrofuscae.

One characteristic of curved sedge is that it often exhibits huge population fluctuations, springing up in large quantities in places like St Andrews Links in 1984 or Sumburgh Airport in the 1950s only to collapse again some years later. Sometimes, these transient populations are thought to have been introduced by spreading sand from places with a buried seed bank.

Its Ellenberg-type indicator values are L=9, F=8, R=7, N=2, S=1 and T=1, which show that it has a preference for bright sunlight, damp conditions, slightly alkaline pH, low fertility, some salinity and cold temperatures.

Few insects have been found to be phytophagous on curved sedge. A specimen collected in Caithness in 1888 was later found to contain galls that were probably caused by the larvae of a gall midge, Planetella sp, but otherwise no such association has been recorded in Britain.

It can be infested by several fungal pathogens

- The smut fungus Anthracoidea karii (Liro) Nannfeldt, 1977 colonises the maturing utricles
- Orphanomyces arcticus (Rostrup) Saville, 1974 creates black stripes on young leaves
- Urocystis littoralis (Lagerheim) Zundel, 1853 causes lead-coloured stripes on the leaves.
