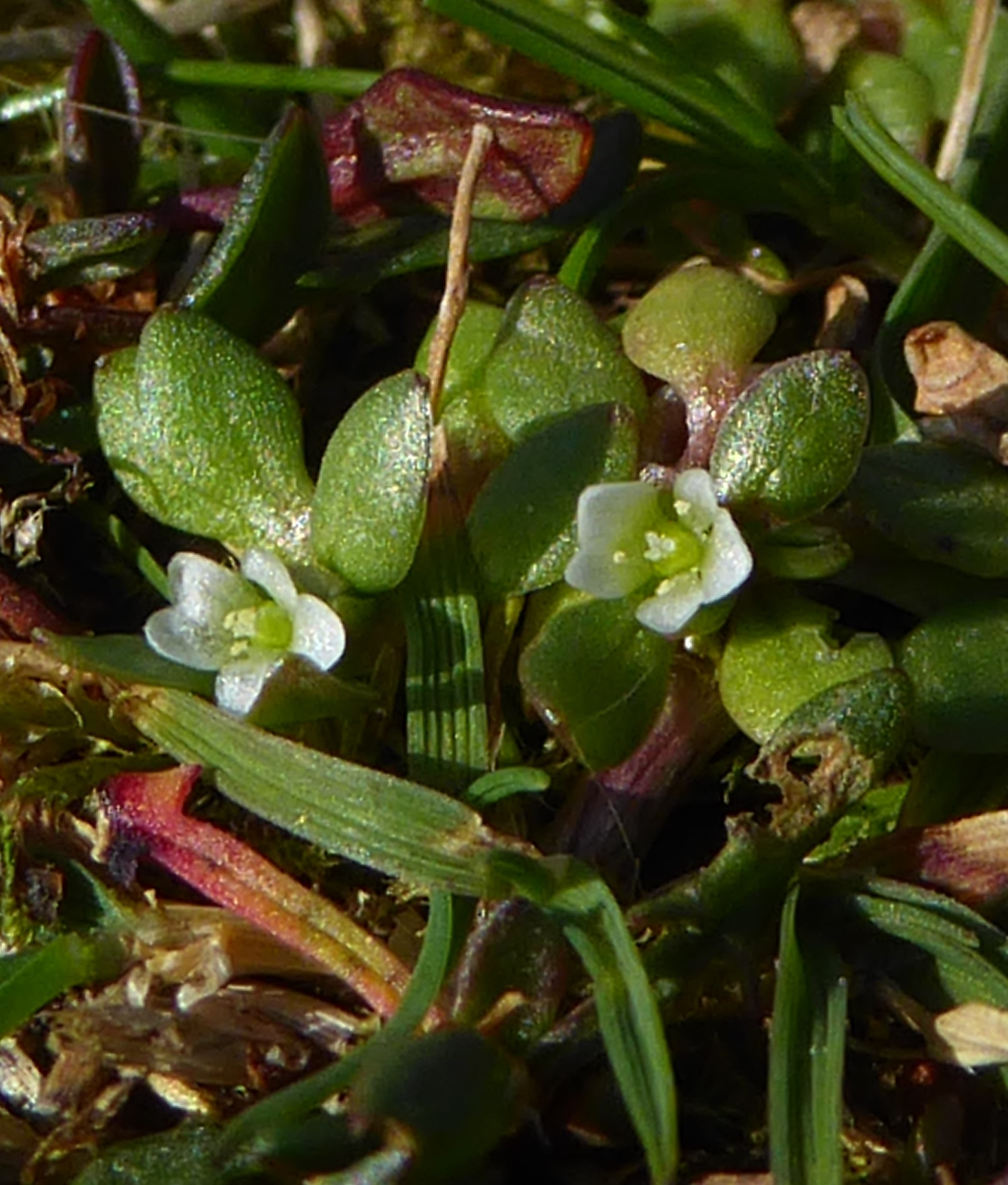

Conservation status
- Least Concern (IUCN 3.1)

Scientific classification
- Kingdom: Plantae
- Clade: Tracheophytes
- Clade: Angiosperms
- Clade: Eudicots
- Order: Caryophyllales
- Family: Montiaceae
- Genus: Montia
- Species: M. fontana

Binomial name
- Montia fontana L.

Synonyms
- List: Calandrinia cerrateae Añon; Calandrinia pusilla Barnéoud; Cameraria fontana Moench; Claytonia fontana (L.) R.J.Davis; Claytonia hallii A.Gray; Claytonia pusilla (Barnéoud) Kuntze; Montia alsine-facie Gilib.; Montia arvensis Wallr.; Montia chaberti Gand.; Montia clara Ö. Nilsson; Montia decumbens St.-Lag.; Montia dipetala Suksd.; Montia erecta Steud.; Montia funstonii Rydb.; Montia hallii (A. Gray) Greene; Montia lamprosperma Cham.; Montia linearifolia d'Urv.; Montia major Steud.; Montia pentandra Willd. ex Cham.; Montia stenophylla Rydb.; Montia tenella Steud.; Montia terrestris Dumort.

= Montia fontana =

Species of flowering plant

Montia fontana, blinks is a herbaceous annual to perennial plant that grows in freshwater springs in upland regions, and in seasonally damp acid grassland in the lowlands. It is widespread throughout the world, except in southern Asia. It is rather variable in morphology, which is reflected in a complex history of taxonomy. Currently, there are three accepted subspecies which are defined largely by the appearance of the seedcoat. It is edible and consumed as a salad in some areas, but is otherwise of minimal economic impact. Because of its association with clean water habitats, it is often viewed as a species of conservation value.

== Description ==
Blinks is an annual to perennial prostrate herb with branching stems, sometimes forming mats up to 50 cm across in short, seasonally damp grassland or floating in streams and hollows. The stems are thin (0.5 mm diameter) and reddish, sometimes rooting in water. The primary roots are fleshy and pink, and there are numerous secondary roots with fibrous hairs.

The spatulate leaves are succulent and glabrous, arranged in opposite pairs, between 2–20 mm long and 1.5–6 mm wide, with a hydathode at the tip. On some plants, particularly those floating in water, the leaves have a distinct petiole, whereas on those (mainly subsp. chondrosperma) which grow in dry grassland, the leaves narrow towards their bases and fuse with the opposite one at the stem (i.e. they are connate).

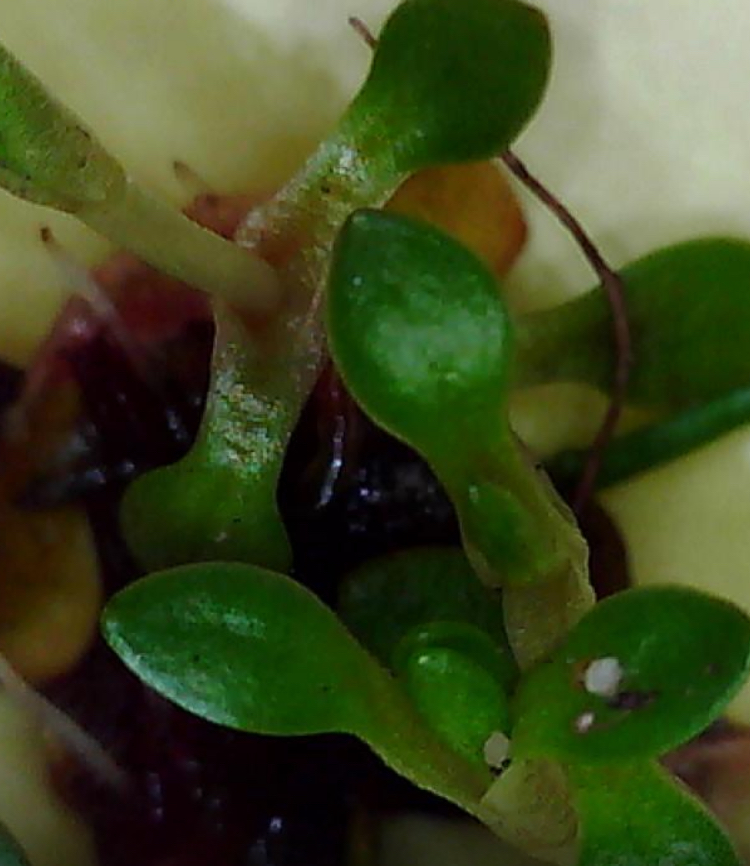
The leaves on a small plant are often joined at the base.

The inflorescence consists of a terminal cyme of two or three tiny white flowers 2–3 mm in diameter with five petals, two sepals, 3-5 stamens, 1-3 styles, each with one stigma. The fruit capsules are 2 mm in diameter and contain 3 round seeds. The architecture of the seeds differentiates the four subspecies of blinks.

== Taxonomy ==
The name Montia fontana was coined by Linnaeus in 1753 in Species Plantarum, but it has had many synonyms before and since; Linnaeus lists "Montia aquatica minor", "Cameraria aquatica minor" and "Portulaca arvensis" among them.

The generic name Montia is a tribute to Giuseppe Monti (1682-1760), a professor of botany at Bologna. The epithet fontana derives from the Latin fontanus, a spring, and refers to its habitat. The common name "blinks" may come from the Old English "blincan", to shine or twinkle. Other common names for it include "water blinks", "water chickweed" or (in the US) "annual water miner's lettuce".

Because blinks is such a widespread and variable species, many synonyms have been coined, and many subspecies have been described which reflect this variability. The currently accepted account is largely based on that of Max Walters in the British journal Watsonia in 1953. In this paper he described 4 subspecies:

- subsp. fontana, which has smooth, shiny seeds 1.1-1.35 mm in diameter and occurs in very wet places worldwide, often growing as a floating plant with petiolate leaves.
- subsp. chondrosperma (Fenzl) Walters, which has less shiny seeds 1.0-1.2 mm diameter and occurs on sandy soils in lowland places. It is a small plant (~1 cm tall) with connate leaf bases.
- subsp. intermedia (Beeby) Walters, which has shiny tuberculate seeds 0.85-1.1 mm diameter and grows in very wet places in Western Europe and Australia. This is now called Montia fontana subsp. amporitana Sennen.
- subsp. variabilis Walters, which has smooth seeds 0.9-1.1 mm diameter and grows in wet places in Britain and possibly elsewhere. This is no longer considered a valid taxon.

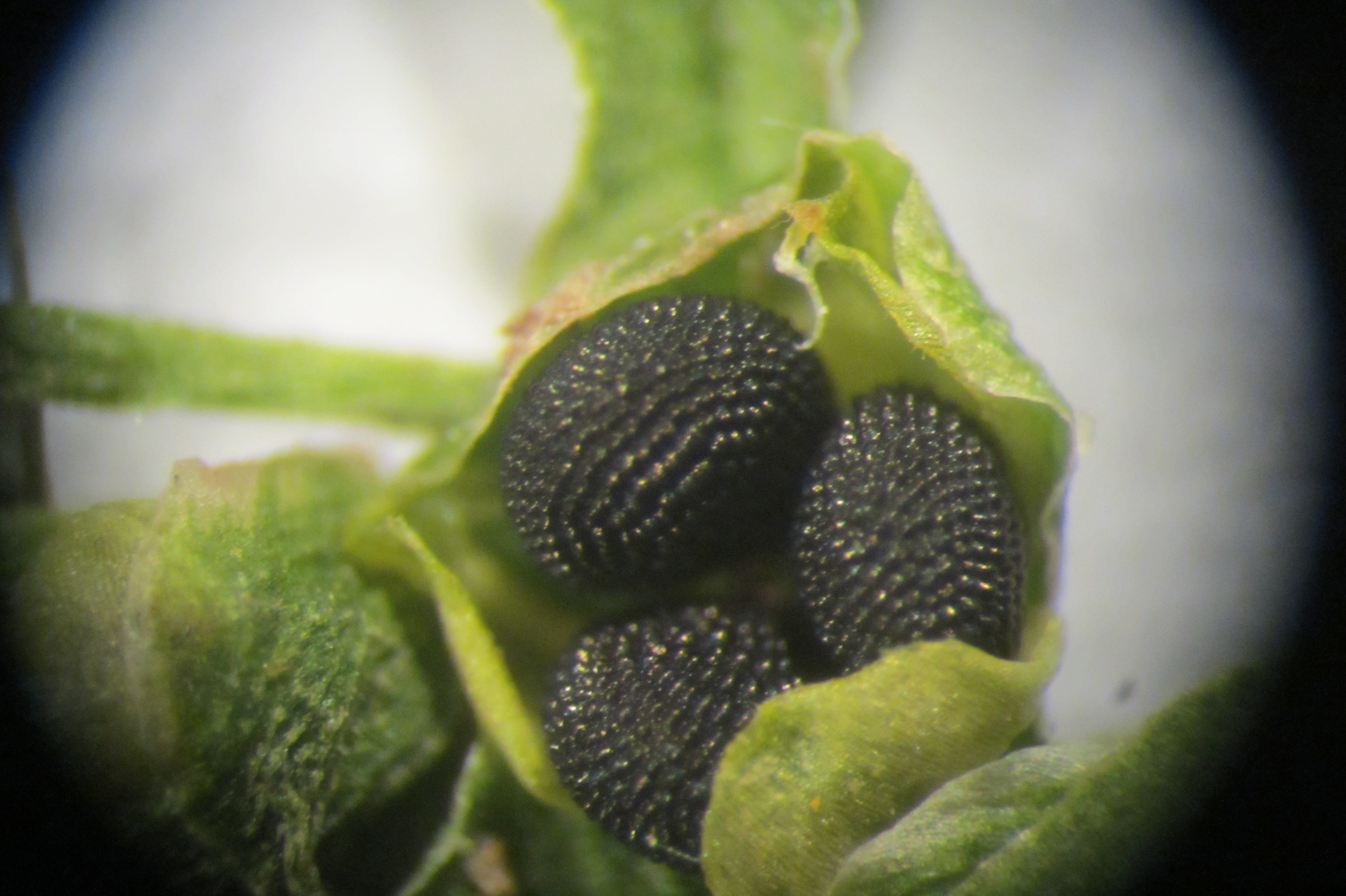
The seedcoat is important in identifying the subspecies; this is subsp. chondrosperma.

== Distribution and status ==
Blinks has an almost world-wide distribution, and it is considered a native species in most places, and in all continents except Antarctica. It is apparently considered an introduction only in Venezuela and the Falkland Islands, and it is absent only from southern Asia.

The threat status of Blinks globally and in Europe is LC, as it is in Britain, where it is common and widespread in the north and west, becoming scattered and rare towards the south and east. Despite its abundance, it is listed as an axiophyte in most British counties.

== Habitat and ecology ==
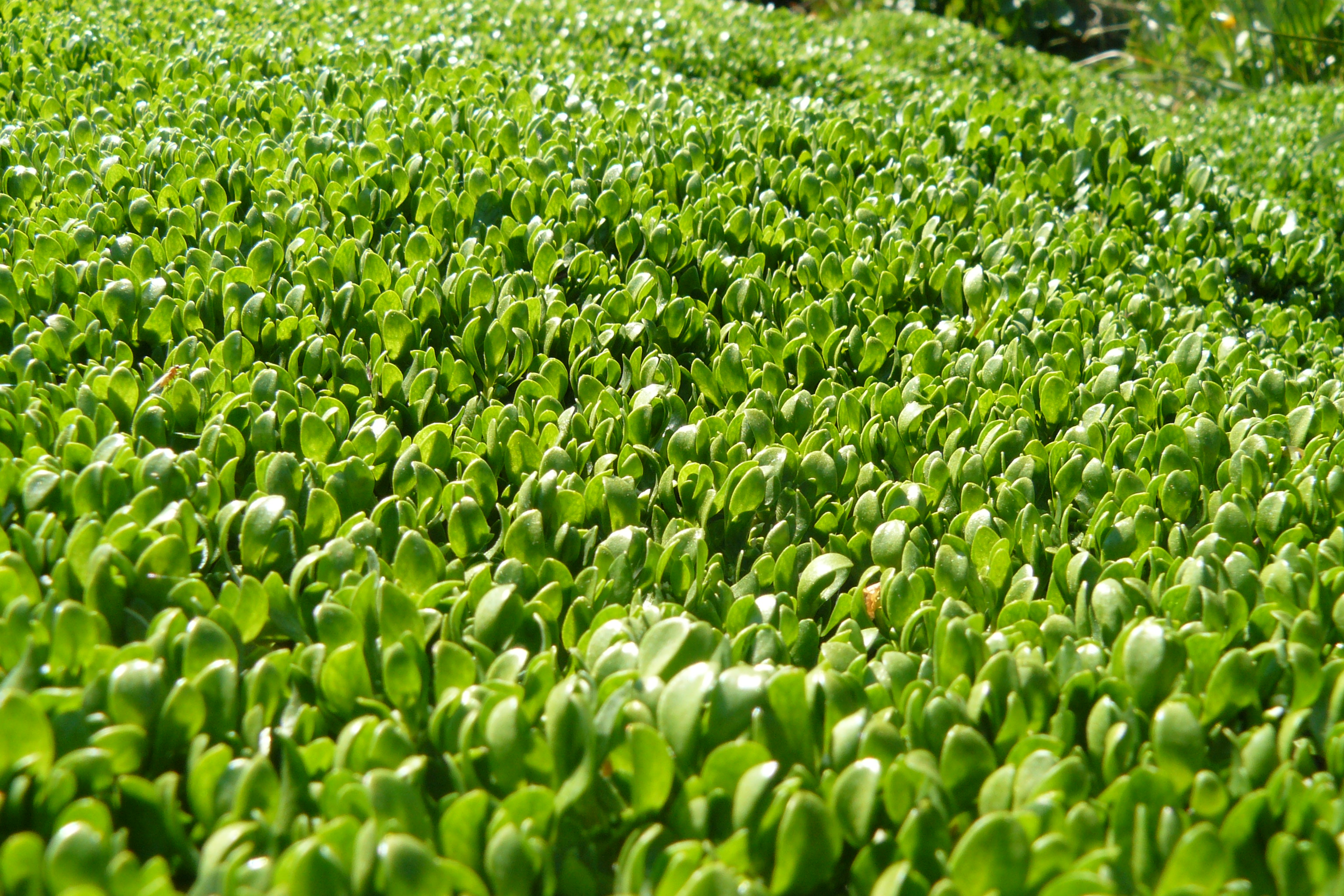
A sward of blinks in a flush in France

Blinks grows in a wide range of wetland habitats, from permanently wet pools, springs and streamsides to winter-wet, sandy grassland. It mostly grows in acid places, but is tolerant of mildly alkaline conditions. Its altitudinal range in Britain is from sea level to 996 m in Coire Leachavie, Glen Affric. The flowers are either pollinated by insects or (especially if underwater, when they are often cleistogamous) will self-pollinate.

Its Ellenberg values in Britain are L = 7, F = 9, R = 5, N = 3 and S = 0, which show that it occurs in fairly sunny places with slightly acid damp soils and low nutrient conditions. It is not tolerant of salt.

Under the European system for classifying habitats, EUNIS, Blinks is a characteristic species in three habitats, comprising four communities: C2.18 acid oligotrophic vegetation of spring brooks; C2.25 acid oligotrophic vegetation of fast-flowing stream; and D2.2C soft water spring mires, including D2.2C11 montane soft water moss springs. Within the British NVC blinks (particularly subsp. fontana) occurs in several types of upland spring-fed vegetation, most characteristically M35 Ranunculus omiophyllus-Montia fontana rills, and (mainly subsp. chondrosperma) in summer-dry, rain-fed U1 Festuca ovina-Agrostis capillaris-Rumex acetosella grassland in sandy, more lowland habitats.

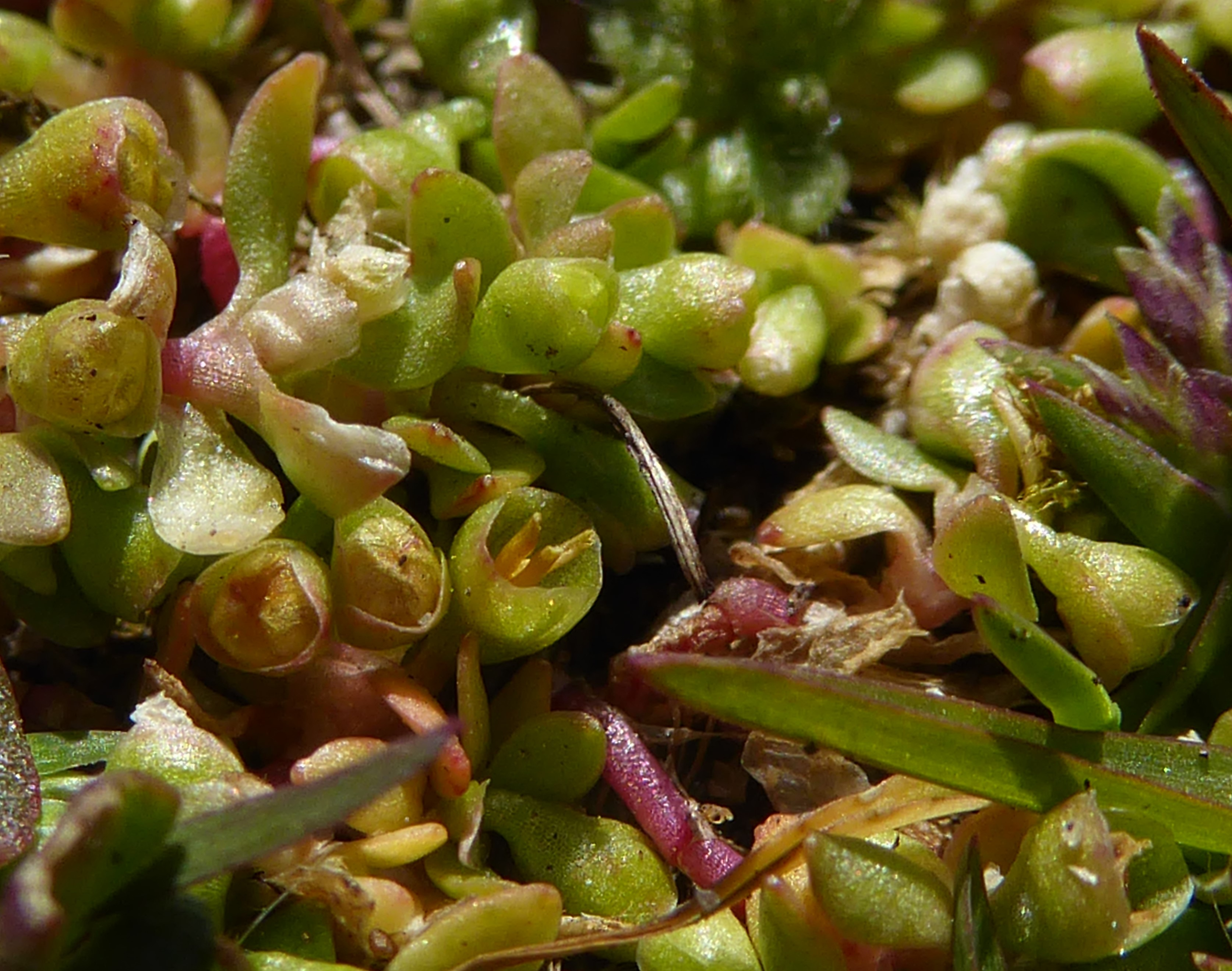
Montia fontana subsp. chondrosperma in a grassy sward, already going to seed in April.

Blinks is occasionally found in secondary populations in other habitats, such as woodland stream sides, where it has presumably been washed up, or in bowling greens or pavements after habitats have been built over.

The beetle Phaedon armoraciae chews on its leaves in Scotland, and the smut-like ascomycete Tolyposporium montiae (Rostrup) Rostrup, 1904 can infest the root collar area. There is a species of vinegar fly, Scaptomyza graminum whose larvae produce leaf mines in blinks; it has been recorded in Britain and Europe.

== Uses ==
Blinks is edible and is gathered in the wild and used as a salad vegetable in Spain and Portugal, but it is not currently cultivated. It is high in fibre and is a rich source of omega-3 fatty acids.
