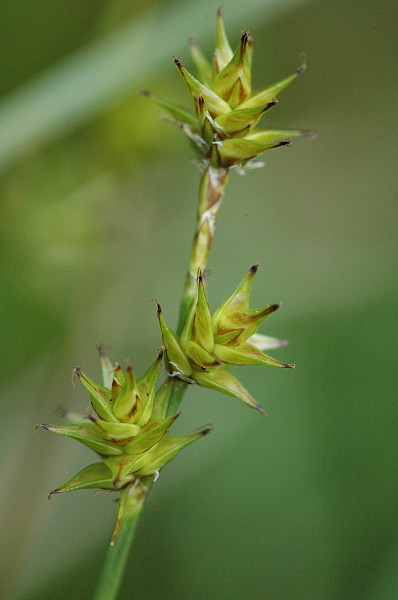

Conservation status
- Least Concern (IUCN 3.1)

Scientific classification
- Kingdom: Plantae
- Clade: Tracheophytes
- Clade: Angiosperms
- Clade: Monocots
- Clade: Commelinids
- Order: Poales
- Family: Cyperaceae
- Genus: Carex
- Subgenus: Carex subg. Vignea
- Section: Carex sect. Stellulatae
- Species: C. echinata

Binomial name
- Carex echinata Murray

Synonyms
- Vignea echinata Murray (Fourr). (1869).

= Carex echinata =

Species of grass-like plant in the sedge family

Carex echinata is a species of sedge known by the common names star sedge and little prickly sedge.

== Description ==
Carex echinata is a tussock-forming, grasslike plant in the family Cyperaceae. It has a solid, ridged stem that may exceed 1 m (3 ft 3 in) in height with a few thready leaves toward the base. The inflorescences are star-shaped spikelets and are 3–15 mm (0.12–0.59 in) wide.

It is infected by the fungal species Anthracoidea karii.

== Distribution and habitat ==
This plant is native to North and Central America and parts of Eurasia; as of 2016, it had spread as far as Taiwan. Carex echinata is a plant of wet forests, marshes, and mountain meadows of moderate elevation. It is commonly associated with peat bogs.
