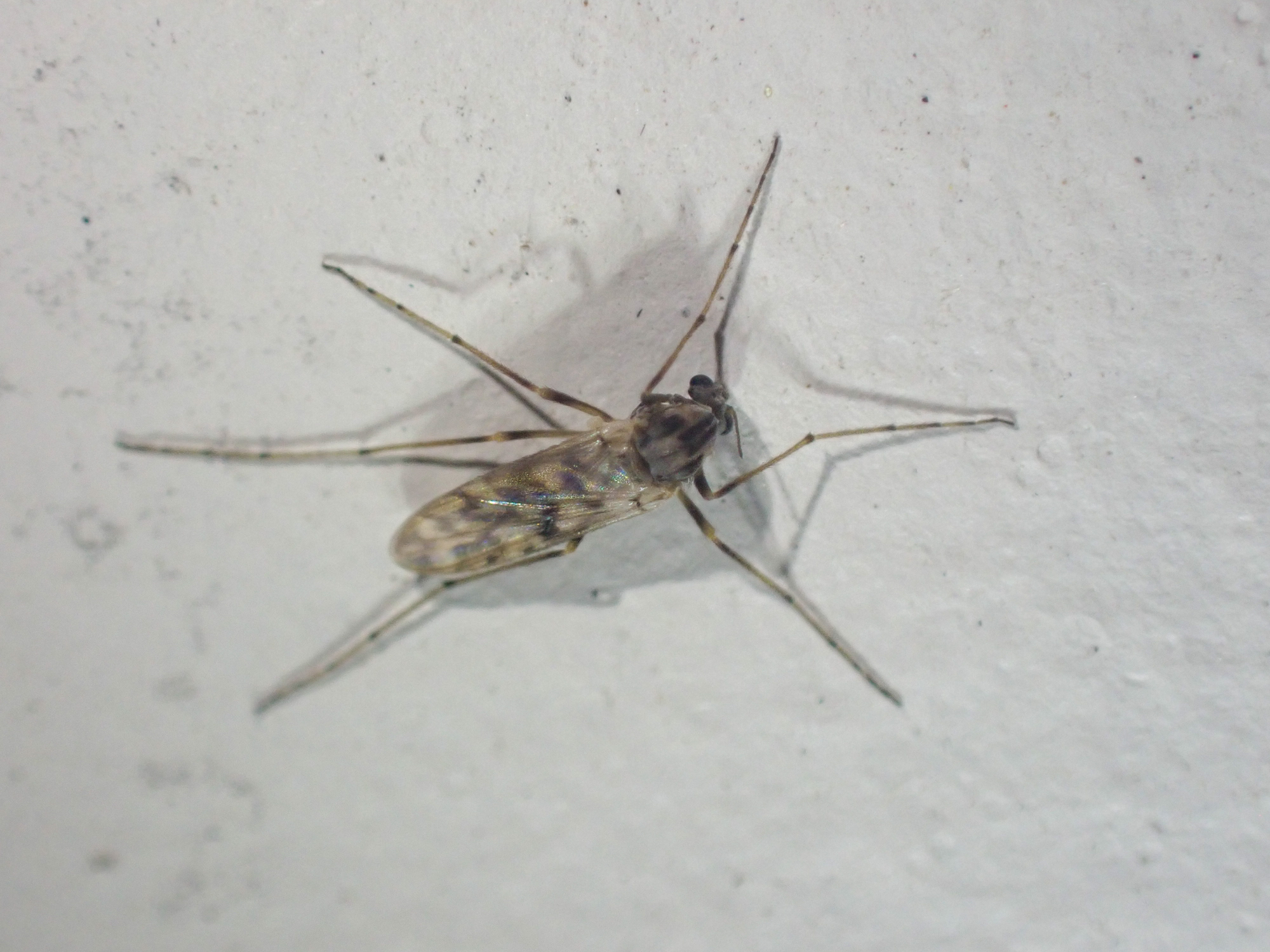
- Gressittius antarcticus in Nelson Lakes National Park

Scientific classification
- Kingdom: Animalia
- Phylum: Arthropoda
- Class: Insecta
- Order: Diptera
- Family: Chironomidae
- Genus: Gressittius
- Species: G. antarcticus

Binomial name
- Gressittius antarcticus (Hudson, 1892)

= Gressittius antarcticus =

Species of insect

Gressittius antarcticus is a species of non-biting midge found in New Zealand. It was described by George Hudson in 1892, and the genus was named after J.L. Gressitt. The species is found across New Zealand, including the main islands and the subantarctic islands. On the Campbell Islands, it is found in large numbers in Callitrache-Montia pools.
