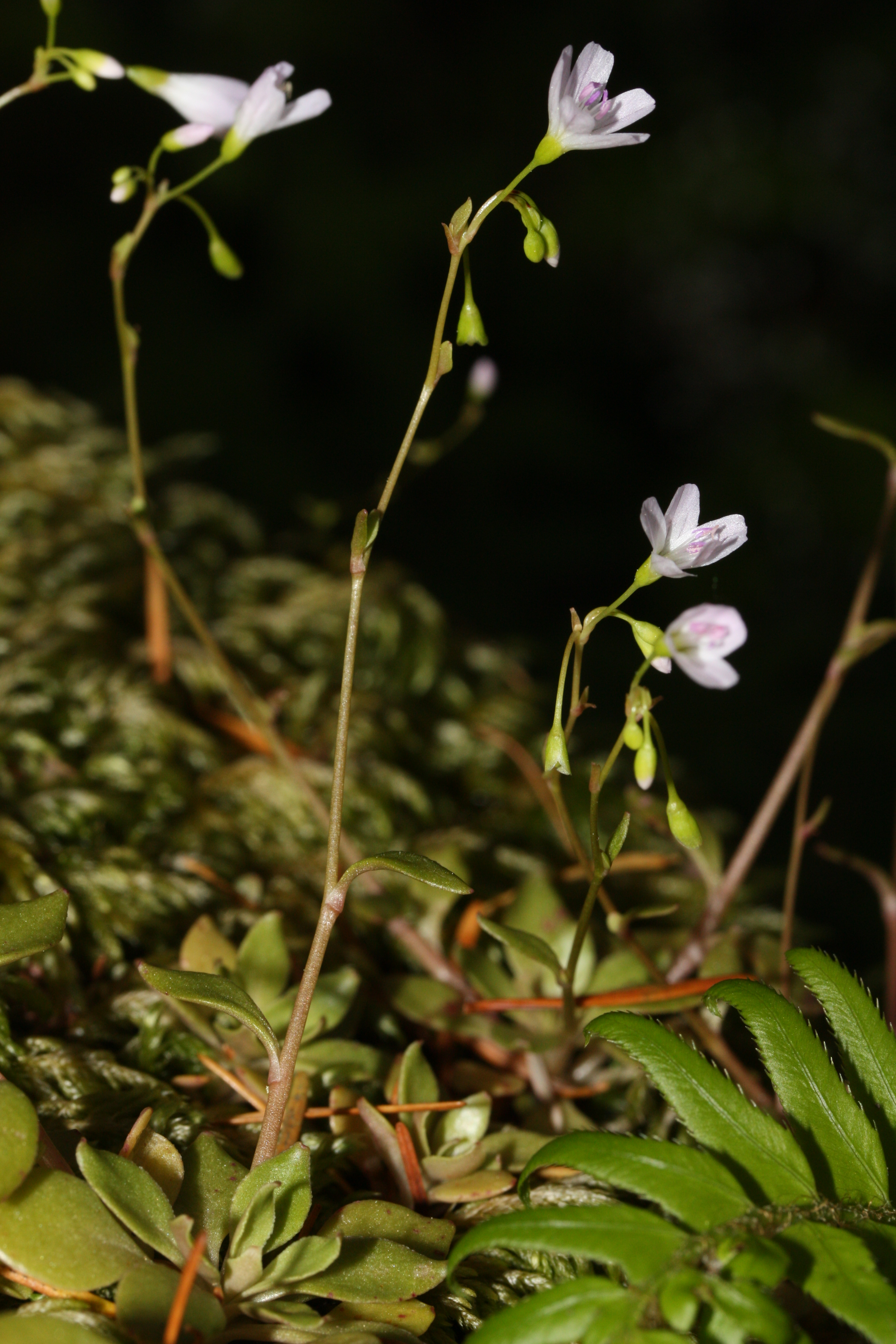

Scientific classification
- Kingdom: Plantae
- Clade: Tracheophytes
- Clade: Angiosperms
- Clade: Eudicots
- Order: Caryophyllales
- Family: Montiaceae
- Genus: Montia
- Species: M. parvifolia

Binomial name
- Montia parvifolia (Moc. ex DC.) Greene

Synonyms
- Claytonia parvifolia Moc. ex DC.; Naiocrene parvifolia (Moc. ex DC.) Rydb.

= Montia parvifolia =

Species of flowering plant

Montia parvifolia is a species of flowering plant in the family Montiaceae known by the common names little-leaf miner's lettuce, small-leaved blinks and small-leaved montia. It is native to western North America from Alaska to California to Montana, where it grows in moist to wet areas in several types of mountain habitat.

== Description ==
Montia parvifolia is a perennial herb growing erect to about 40 centimeters (16 in) tall from a matted, branching caudex base. It spreads via leafy stolons with sprouting bulblets. The fleshy oval leaves are alternately arranged in a rosette and measure up to 6 centimeters (2.4 in) in length. The flower stems (peduncles) arise basally from the leaf rosette, and the inflorescence at the tip of the stem bears 1 to 12 flowers each with five pink or white petals up to 1.5 centimeters (0.59 in) long.
