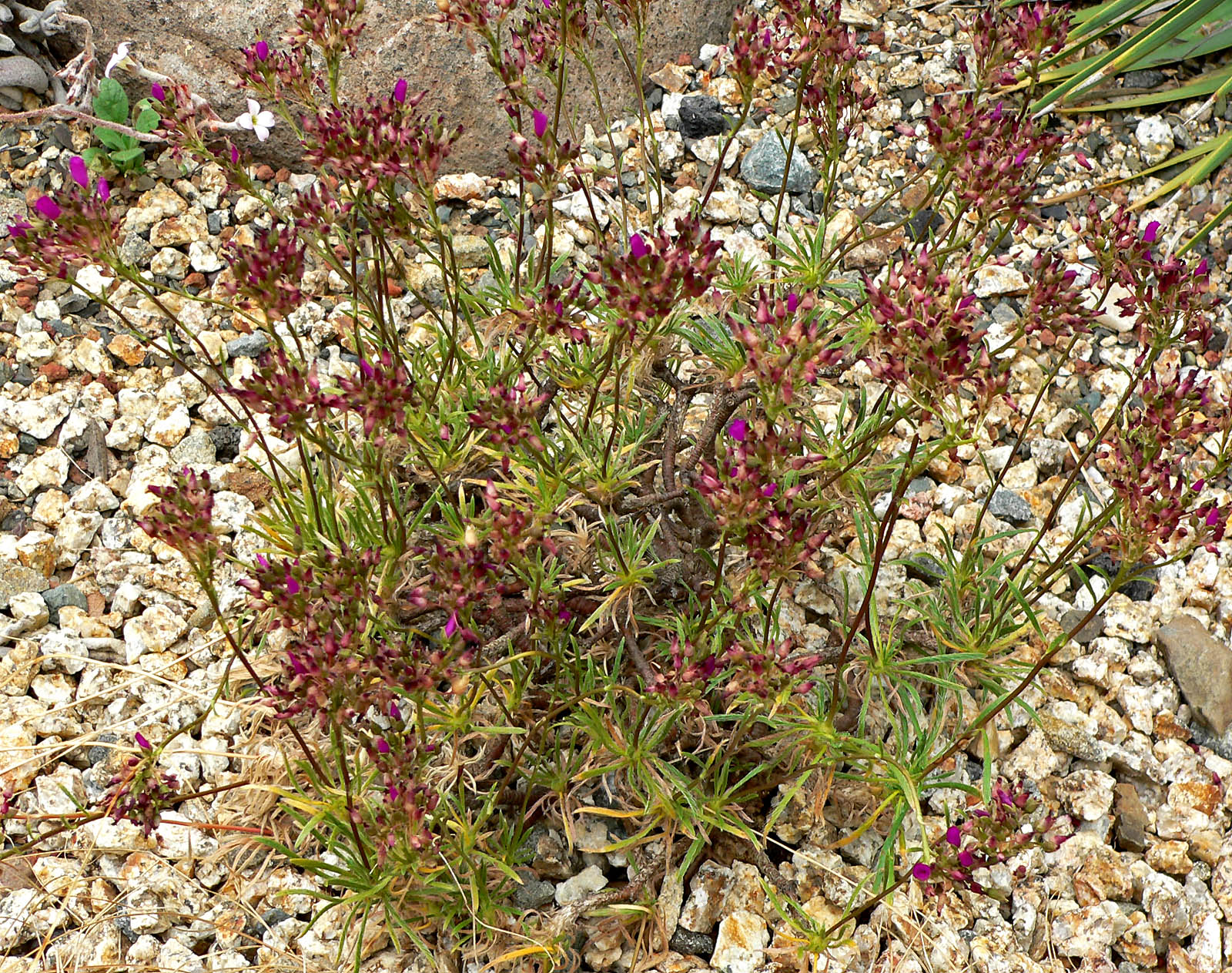
- Montiopsis umbellata

Scientific classification
- Kingdom: Plantae
- Clade: Tracheophytes
- Clade: Angiosperms
- Clade: Eudicots
- Order: Caryophyllales
- Family: Montiaceae
- Genus: Montiopsis; Kuntze

Synonyms
- Calandriniopsis E.Franz

= Montiopsis =

Genus of flowering plant

Montiopsis is a genus of flowering plants belonging to the family Montiaceae.

Its native range is Peru to southern South America. It is found in Argentina, Bolivia, Chile and Peru.

The genus name of Montiopsis is in honour of Giuseppe Monti (1682–1760), an Italian chemist and botanist. It was first described and published in Revis. Gen. Pl. Vol.3 (Issue 2) on page 14 in 1898.

== Known species ==
According to Kew:

- Montiopsis andicola (Gillies) D.I.Ford
- Montiopsis berteroana (Phil.) D.I.Ford
- Montiopsis capitata (Hook. & Arn.) D.I.Ford
- Montiopsis cistiflora (Gillies ex Arn.) D.I.Ford
- Montiopsis copiapina (Phil.) D.I.Ford
- Montiopsis cumingii (Hook. & Arn.) D.I.Ford
- Montiopsis demissa (Phil.) D.I.Ford
- Montiopsis gayana (Barnéoud) D.I.Ford
- Montiopsis gilliesii (Hook. & Arn.) D.I.Ford
- Montiopsis glomerata (Phil.) D.I.Ford
- Montiopsis modesta (Phil.) D.I.Ford
- Montiopsis parviflora (Phil.) D.I.Ford
- Montiopsis polycarpoides (Phil.) Peralta
- Montiopsis potentilloides (Barnéoud) D.I.Ford
- Montiopsis ramosissima (Hook. & Arn.) D.I.Ford
- Montiopsis sericea (Hook. & Arn.) D.I.Ford
- Montiopsis trifida (Hook. & Arn.) D.I.Ford
- Montiopsis umbellata (Ruiz & Pav.) D.I.Ford
