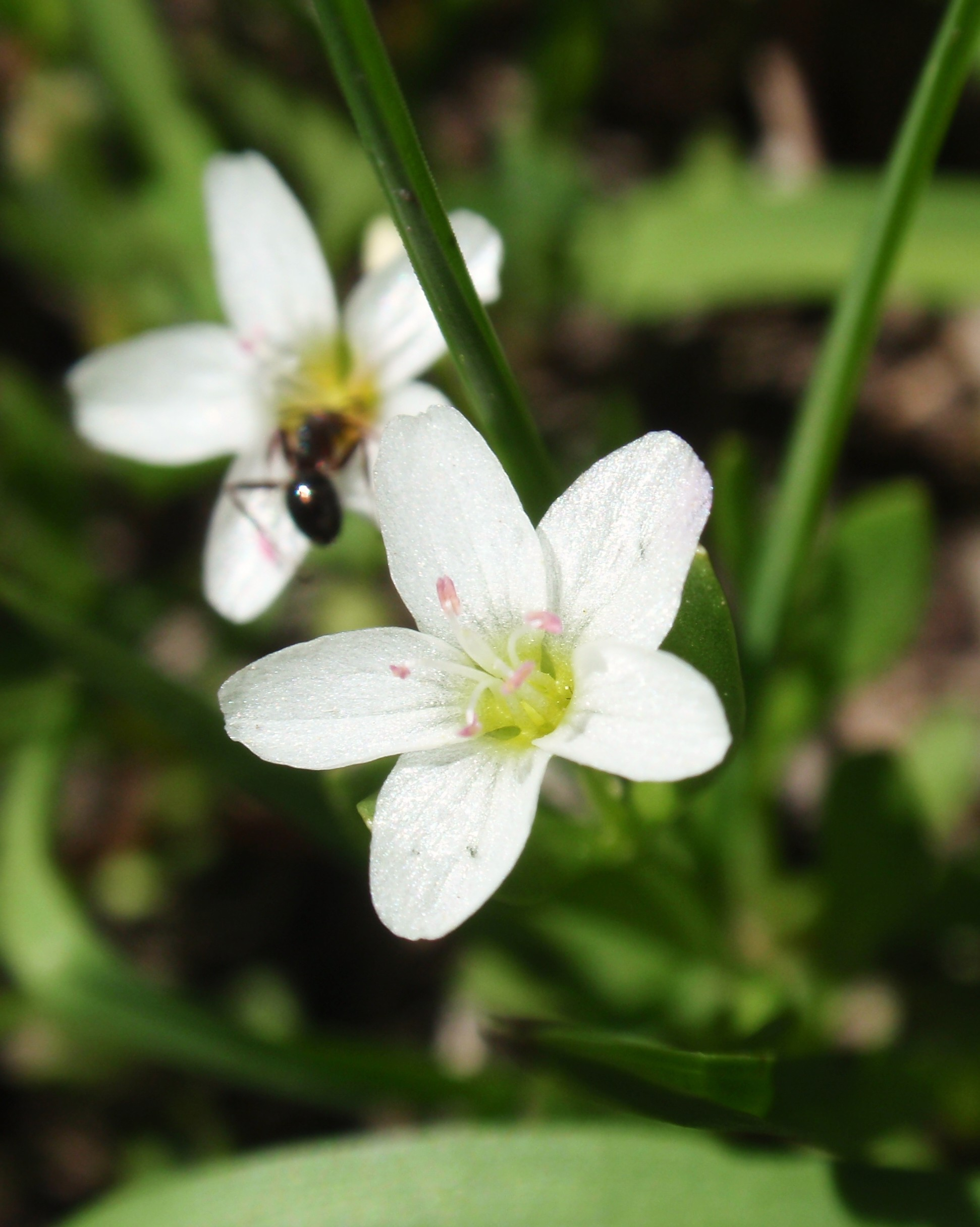

Conservation status
- Secure (NatureServe)

Scientific classification
- Kingdom: Plantae
- Clade: Tracheophytes
- Clade: Angiosperms
- Clade: Eudicots
- Order: Caryophyllales
- Family: Montiaceae
- Genus: Montia
- Species: M. chamissoi

Binomial name
- Montia chamissoi (Ledeb. ex Spreng.)Greene

Synonyms
- List: Claytonia aquatica Nutt.; Claytonia chamissoi Ledeb. ex Spreng.; Claytonia chamissonis Eschsch. ex Cham.; Claytonia stolonifera C.A.Mey.; Crunocallis chamissoi (Ledeb. ex Spreng.) Cockerell ex Daniels; Crunocallis chamissonis (Eschsch. ex Cham.) Rydb.

= Montia chamissoi =

Plant species in the springbeauty family

Montia chamissoi is a species of flowering plant in the family Montiaceae known by the common names of water minerslettuce, water montia, Indian lettuce, and toad lily. It is native to much of western North America from Alaska to the southwestern and central United States and also in British Columbia. It grows in moist to wet soils in a variety of habitat types, such as meadows, wetlands, plains, and montanes (Kershaw et al., 1998). It is sometimes aquatic, anchoring in mud and floating in water.

== Description ==
Montia chamissoi is a small perennial herb growing from a pinkish rhizome and spreading through stolons. The fleshy stems are erect, creeping, tangled in mats, or floating, growing from five to twenty centimeters long. The oblong or widely lance-shaped succulent, pale green, leaves are oppositely arranged and measure anywhere from two to five centimeters in length. The inflorescence is a raceme of two or more flowers with two sepals, sometimes arising from leaf axils. The flower has usually five white or pinkish petals just under a centimeter in length and includes five stamens with a style tipped with three stigmas. Their fruits involve egg-shaped capsules that are widest above the middle that range from two to three millimeters long. These fruits are black, bumpy, shiny, and oblong shaped. The flower blooms from June to August (Kershaw et al., 1998). The stolons may produce small bulblets at their ends.

== Distribution ==
Montia chamissoi is endemic to western North America, with a wide distribution. It appears between 7,000 and 9,000 feet in elevation, in wetlands, montanes, and prairie zones. It occurs in the Rocky Mountain region, Pacific Alaska region, Pacific region, and in part of the mid-Atlantic and Great Lakes region. It is prevalent in Canada, in Alberta and British Columbia. It can also grow on the dry slopes of the plains and foothills. It is found rarely in coastal areas. In Minnesota there is one population occupying about 25 square meters found around a cold water spring, as such it is listed as an endangered species in that state.

== Preservation ==
Brussard noted that there have been failures and success when trying to preserve M. chamissoi due to mining development in the United States. Brussard observed that a population of M. chamissoi was destroyed by road construction near a ski area, the only known population in Gunnison County, Colorado. This led to an increase in Rocky Mountain Biological Laboratories and helped establish the laboratory's claim to undisturbed habitat as a natural resource (Brussard, 1982). It is a rare plant species in British Columbia and is a candidate species for restoration and preservation. (Rose & Burton, 2011). Even though, M.chamissoi has a very wide distribution it is currently listed as endangered in Minnesota and Pennsylvania and restoration efforts are underway.

== Photos ==
- Calphotos
- Calflora.net
