= Farysia =

Scientific classification
- Kingdom: Fungi
- Division: Basidiomycota
- Class: Ustilaginomycetes
- Order: Ustilaginales
- Family: Anthracoideaceae
- Genus: Farysia; Racib.

Type species
- Farysia javanica Racib.

Genus of fungi

Farysia is a genus of fungi belonging to the family Anthracoideaceae. It was formerly placed in the defunct family Farysiaceae. The genus has a cosmopolitan distribution.

== Species ==
As accepted by Species Fungorum:

- Farysia acheniorum (Buhagiar & J.A. Barnett) Begerow, Q.M. Wang, F.Y. Bai & Boekhout (2015)
- Farysia americana Cif. (1931)
- Farysia butleri (Syd. & P. Syd.) Syd. & P. Syd. (1919)
- Farysia cariciphila (Speg.) Hirschh. (1986)
- Farysia caricis-filicinae S. Ito (1935)
- Farysia caricis-petitianae (Zundel) Vánky (1999)
- Farysia catenata (F. Ludw.) Syd. (1927)
- Farysia chardoniana Zundel (1943)
- Farysia corniculata Vánky (1992)
- Farysia depota Cif. (1933)
- Farysia echinulata Vánky (2011)
- Farysia globispora Vánky & R.G. Shivas (2009)
- Farysia itapuensis Landell & P. Valente ex Denchev & T. Denchev (2021)
- Farysia javanica Racib. (1909)
- Farysia longispora Vánky & McKenzie (2009)
- Farysia magdalenana Albu, Rush, Kijporn. & Aime (2020)
- Farysia merrillii (Henn.) Syd. & P. Syd. (1919)
- Farysia microspora Vánky & McKenzie (2009)
- Farysia nakanishikii (Henn.) Syd. & P. Syd. (1919)
- Farysia nigra (G. Cunn.) G. Cunn. (1926)
- Farysia orientalis L. Ling (1949)
- Farysia setubalensis Á. Fonseca & J. Inácio ex Denchev & T. Denchev (2021)
- Farysia taiwaniana P.H. Wang, Yen T. Wang & S.H. Yang ex Denchev & T. Denchev (2021)
- Farysia thuemenii (A.A. Fisch. Waldh.) Nannf. (1959)
- Farysia trichopterygis (Massee) Zundel (1953)
- Farysia unciniae Vánky & Begerow (2007)
- Farysia venezuelana Zundel (1943)
- Farysia zeylanica Liro (1939)

Former species:

- F. barberi (Mundk.) Zundel (1953) = Sporisorium barberi, Ustilaginaceae
- F. caricis (DC.) Liro (1935) = Farysia thuemenii
- F. emodensis (Berk.) Syd. & P. Syd. (1919) = Microbotryum emodense, Microbotryaceae
- F. endotricha (Berk.) Syd. & P. Syd. (1919) = Farysporium endotrichum
- F. jaapii Syd. (1925) = Farysia thuemenii
- F. merrillii sensu Cunningham = Farysia zeylanica
- F. olivacea (Jaap) Höhn. (1917) = Farysia thuemenii
- F. olivacea (DC.) Syd. & P. Syd. (1920) = Farysia thuemenii
- F. subolivacea (Henn.) Cif. (1933) = Farysia thuemenii
