= Montia bostockii =

Scientific classification
- Kingdom: Plantae
- Clade: Tracheophytes
- Clade: Angiosperms
- Clade: Eudicots
- Order: Caryophyllales
- Family: Montiaceae
- Genus: Montia
- Species: M. bostockii

Binomial name
- Montia bostockii (A.E.Porsild) S.L.Welsh

Synonyms
- Claytonia bostockii A.E.Porsild; Claytoniella bostockii (A.E.Porsild) Jurtzev; Montiastrum bostockii (A.E.Porsild) Ö.Nilsson

Species of flowering plant

Montia bostockii, known by the common name Bostock's minerslettuce, is a species in the genus Montia found in Alaska and northwestern Canada.

== Description ==
Montia bostockii is a perennial forb that flowers in the early summer. It is closely related to Montia vassilievii, and the taxa are sometimes treated synonymously. It was once considered a candidate for protection through the Endangered Species Act, but it was found to be more abundant and widespread than thought previously.
