= Montia australasica =

Scientific classification
- Kingdom: Plantae
- Clade: Tracheophytes
- Clade: Angiosperms
- Clade: Eudicots
- Order: Caryophyllales
- Family: Montiaceae
- Genus: Montia
- Species: M. australasica

Binomial name
- Montia australasica (Hook.f.) Pax & K.Hoffm.

Species of plant

Montia australasica is a species of flowering plant in the genus Montia.
