= Montia diffusa =

Scientific classification
- Kingdom: Plantae
- Clade: Tracheophytes
- Clade: Angiosperms
- Clade: Eudicots
- Order: Caryophyllales
- Family: Montiaceae
- Genus: Montia
- Species: M. diffusa

Binomial name
- Montia diffusa (Nutt.) Greene

Synonyms
- Claytonia diffusa Nutt.; Limnalsine diffusa (Nutt.) Rydb.

Species of flowering plant

Montia diffusa is a species of flowering plant in the family Montiaceae known by the common names branching montia and spreading miner's lettuce native to North America.

== Distribution ==
It is native to western North America from British Columbia to northern California, where it occurs mainly west of Cascade Range crest. It grows in moist to wet wooded areas, including areas recently affected by wildfire.

== Description ==
Montia diffusa is an annual herb growing erect to about 20 centimeters in maximum height, its stem branching intricately. The diamond or lance-shaped leaves are alternately arranged and measure up to 5 centimeters in length, not counting their long petioles. The inflorescence is a raceme of 3 or more flowers. Each flower has usually five pink or white petals under half a centimeter in length blooming from a nearly closed cup of small green sepals wrapped around their bases.
