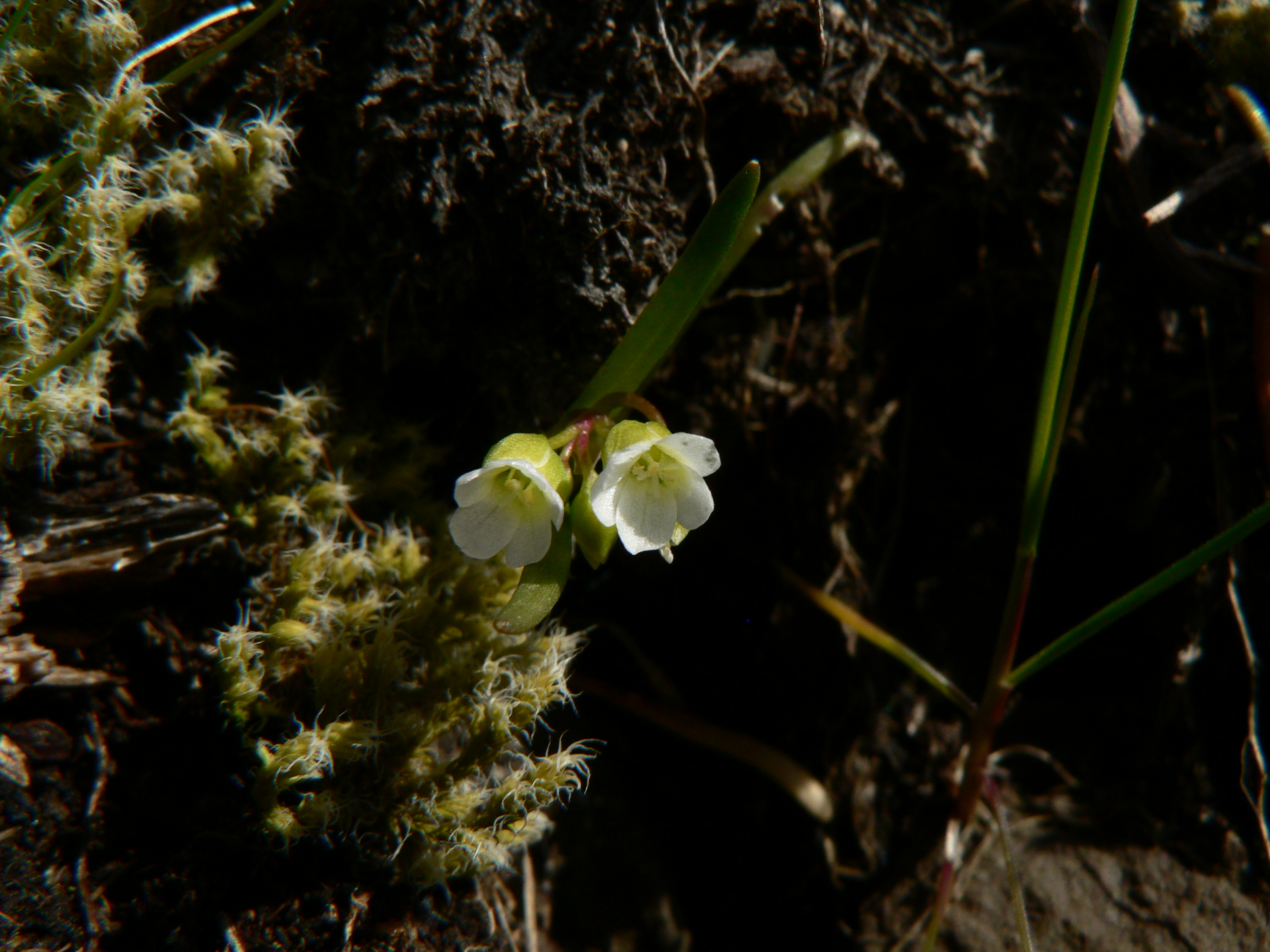

Scientific classification
- Kingdom: Plantae
- Clade: Tracheophytes
- Clade: Angiosperms
- Clade: Eudicots
- Order: Caryophyllales
- Family: Montiaceae
- Genus: Montia
- Species: M. linearis

Binomial name
- Montia linearis (Dougl. ex Hook.) Greene

Synonyms
- Claytonia linearis

= Montia linearis =

Species of flowering plant

Montia linearis is a species of flowering plant in the family Montiaceae known by the common names narrowleaf miner's lettuce and narrow-leafed montia. It is native to western North America from British Columbia to California to Utah, where it grows in moist to wet areas in a number of habitat types, including forests and meadows, woodlands and grassland. The plant is also known from some areas of the southeastern United States, including Mississippi.

== Description ==
Montia linearis is a slender, branching annual herb growing to about 25 to 30 centimeters in maximum height. The somewhat fleshy linear leaves are alternately arranged and measure up to 10 centimeters in length. The inflorescence bears up to 14 flowers with bases of curving oval green sepals. The petals are roughly half a centimeter long and white or pink-tinged in color.
