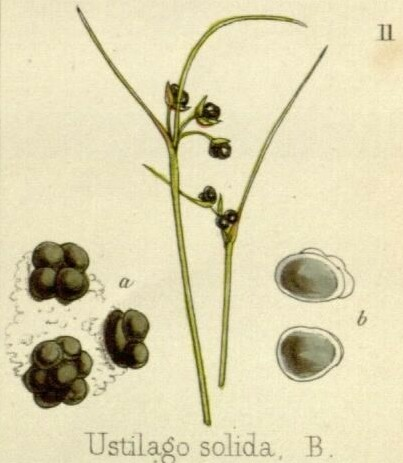
- Cintractia solida, formerly Ustilago solida

Scientific classification
- Domain: Eukaryota
- Kingdom: Fungi
- Division: Basidiomycota
- Class: Ustilaginomycetes
- Order: Ustilaginales
- Family: Anthracoideaceae
- Genus: Cintractia; Cornu, 1883

Type species
- Cintractia axicola (Berk.) Cornu, 1883

= Cintractia =

Genus of fungi

Cintractia is a genus of fungi belonging to the family Anthracoideaceae. It was first described by Marie Maxime Cornu in 1883.

It was formerly placed in the family Cintractiaceae. The genus has cosmopolitan distribution.

== Species ==
As accepted by Species Fungorum;

- Cintractia amazonica Syd. & P. Syd. (1916)
- Cintractia amicta Cif. (1931)
- Cintractia axicola (Berk.) Cornu (1883)
- Cintractia baccata (Wallr.) Syd. (1924)
- Cintractia bulbostylidicola Piątek & Vánky (2007)
- Cintractia bulbostylidis R.G. Shivas & Vánky (2001)
- Cintractia caricis-dioicae Lehtola (1940)
- Cintractia clintonii Cif. (1928)
- Cintractia columellifera (Tul. & C. Tul.) McAlpine (1910)
- Cintractia densa McAlpine (1910)
- Cintractia eleocharidis (Thirum. & Pavgi) Vánky (2005)
- Cintractia fimbristylidis-miliaceae (Henn.) S. Ito (1935)
- Cintractia fischeri (P. Karst.) Liro (1935)
- Cintractia kyllingae J. Kruse & R.G. Shivas (2021)
- Cintractia leioderma (Lagerh.) Cif. (1931)
- Cintractia limitata G.P. Clinton (1904)
- Cintractia lipocarphae Vánky, C. Vánky & R.G. Shivas (2001)
- Cintractia lygei Rabenh. ex Maire (1907)
- Cintractia majewskii Piątek & Vánky (2005)
- Cintractia mitchellii Vánky (1997)
- Cintractia muelleriana (Thüm.) Cif. (1931)
- Cintractia occulta Mol.-Val. (1980)
- Cintractia oreoboli Vánky & McKenzie (1990)
- Cintractia rhynchosporae Cif. (1931)
- Cintractia scabra Syd. (1935)
- Cintractia subinclusa (Körn.) Magnus (1896)
- Cintractia usambarensis (Henn.) Cif. (1931)
- Cintractia vesiculata Mol.-Val. (1980)
