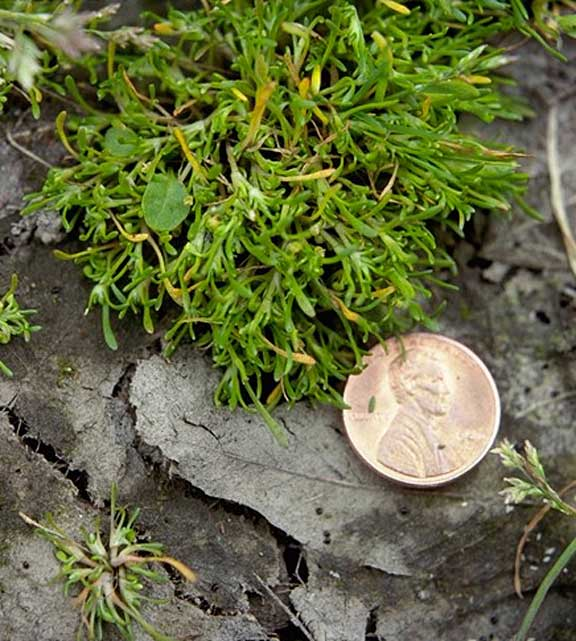

Conservation status
- Vulnerable (NatureServe)

Scientific classification
- Kingdom: Plantae
- Clade: Tracheophytes
- Clade: Angiosperms
- Clade: Eudicots
- Order: Caryophyllales
- Family: Montiaceae
- Genus: Montia
- Species: M. howellii

Binomial name
- Montia howellii S.Watson

Synonyms
- Maxia howelii (S. Watson) Ö. Nilsson; Montiastrum howellii (S. Watson) Rydb.

= Montia howellii =

Species of flowering plant

Montia howellii is a species of flowering plant in the family Montiaceae known by the common names Howell's miner's lettuce and Howell's montia. It is native to western North America from British Columbia to northern California, where it grows in moist to wet habitat, including vernal pools and meadows. It sometimes grows in shallow standing water such as puddles. The species is known from fossilized seeds recovered from sediments of the Pleistocene Tomales Formation and from a small paleoflora at San Bruno. Further, Daniel Axelrod discussed Montia howellii as one of the biogeographically significant species comprising the Millerton Palaeoflora at Tomales.

== Description ==
It is a small, low, mat-forming annual herb growing up to about 9 centimeters in maximum length. The linear or lance-shaped, sometimes grasslike, leaves are alternately arranged and measure up to 2.5 centimeters in length. The inflorescence bears 2 to 6 minute flowers with oval green sepals no more than 2 millimeters long and white petals less than a millimeter in length. The flower is usually cleistogamous, self-fertilizing and sometimes never even opening.

== Conservation ==
This species is believed to be in decline in California, and is ranked as "vulnerable" to extinction overall by NatureServe. Threats to the species include grazing, farming and urbanization.
