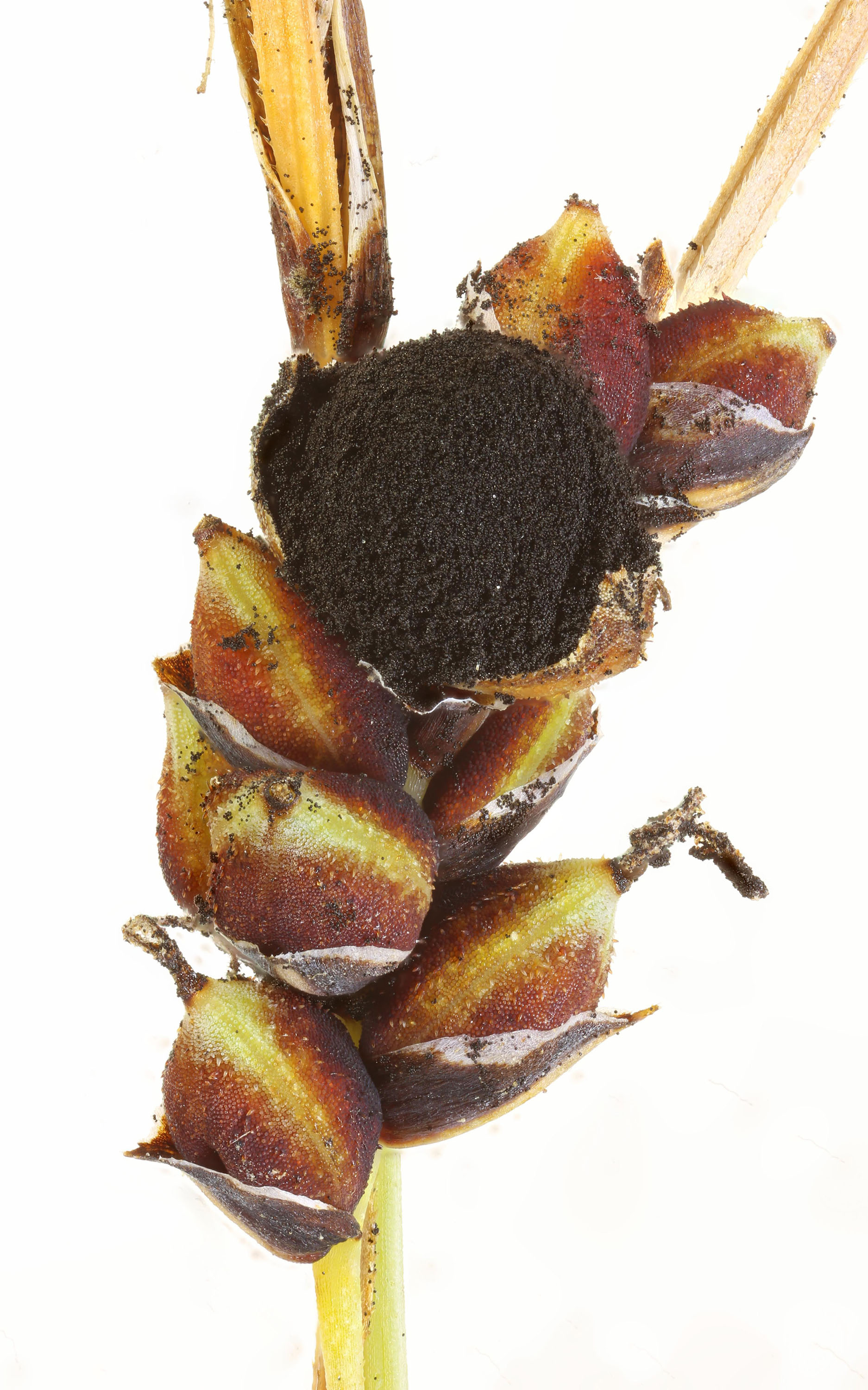
- Anthracoidea paniceae on Carex panicea

Scientific classification
- Kingdom: Fungi
- Division: Basidiomycota
- Class: Ustilaginomycetes
- Order: Ustilaginales
- Family: Anthracoideaceae; Denchev (1997)

Type genus
- Anthracoidea Bref. (1895)

Genera
- See text

Synonyms
- Cintractiaceae Vánky (2000); Dermatosoraceae Vánky (2001); Farysiaceae Vánky (2001)

= Anthracoideaceae =

Family of fungi

The Anthracoideaceae are a family of smut fungi in the order Ustilaginales. Collectively, the family contains 20 genera and 198 species. Anthracoideaceae was circumscribed by the Bulgarian mycologist Cvetomir M. Denchev in 1997.

== Genera ==
As accepted by Wijayawardene et al. 2020;

- Anthracoidea Bref. (112)
- Cintractia Cornu (13)
- Dermatosorus Sawada ex L. Ling (6)
- Farysia Racib. (23)
- Farysporium Vánky (1)
- Heterotolyposporium Vánky (2)
- Kukwaea Suija, Motiej. & Zhurb. (1)
- Kuntzeomyces Henn. Ex Sacc. & P. Syd. (2)
- Leucocintractia M. Piepenbr., Begerow & Oberw. (4)
- Moreaua Liou & H.C. Cheng (39)
- Orphanomyces Savile (3)
- Pilocintractia Vánky (2)
- Planetella Savile (1)
- Portalia V. González, Vánky & Platas (1)
- Schizonella J. Schröt. (5)
- Stegocintractia M. Piepenbr., Begerow & Oberw. (6)
- Testicularia Klotzsch (3)
- Tolyposporium Woronin ex J. Schröt. (5)
- Trichocintractia M. Piepenbr. (1)
- Ustanciosporium Vánky (22)

Note; Crotalia 5 species listed in Species Fungorum, not on Outline of Fungi and fungus-like taxa list

== See also ==
- List of Basidiomycota families
