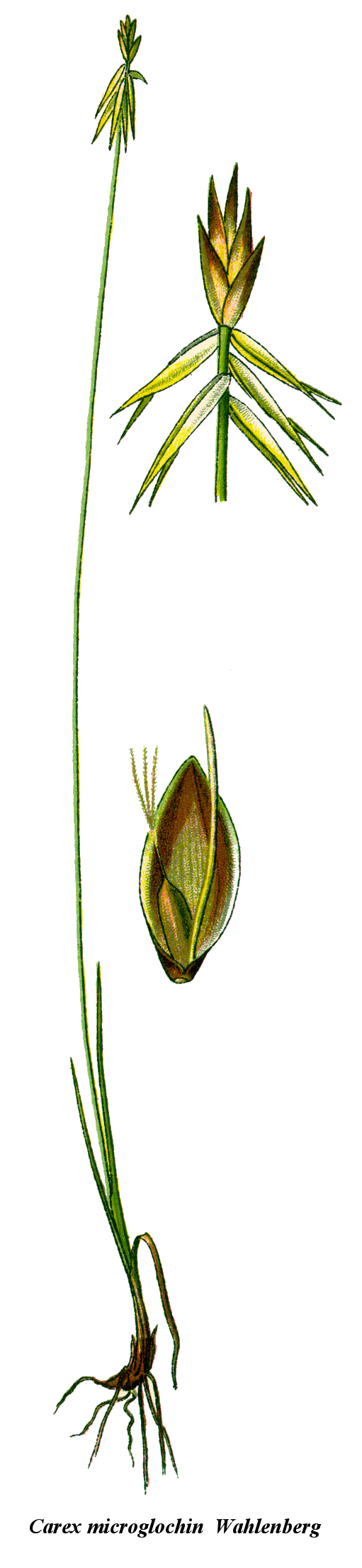
- Botanical illustration

Conservation status
- Least Concern (IUCN 3.1)

Scientific classification
- Kingdom: Plantae
- Clade: Tracheophytes
- Clade: Angiosperms
- Clade: Monocots
- Clade: Commelinids
- Order: Poales
- Family: Cyperaceae
- Genus: Carex
- Species: C. microglochin

Binomial name
- Carex microglochin Wahlenb.

Synonyms
- List: Carex lyonii Boott; Caricinella microglochin (Wahlenb.) St.-Lag.; Kobresia microglochin (Wahlenb.) Tang & W.T.Wang; Uncinia europaea J.Gay; Uncinia microglochin (Wahlenb.) Spreng.

= Carex microglochin =

Species of grass-like plant

Carex microglochin, called the fewseeded bog sedge and bristle sedge, is a species of flowering plant in the genus Carex, native to temperate and subarctic North America, South America, Europe and Asia. It is uncertain which hemisphere it originated on before dispersing to the other.
