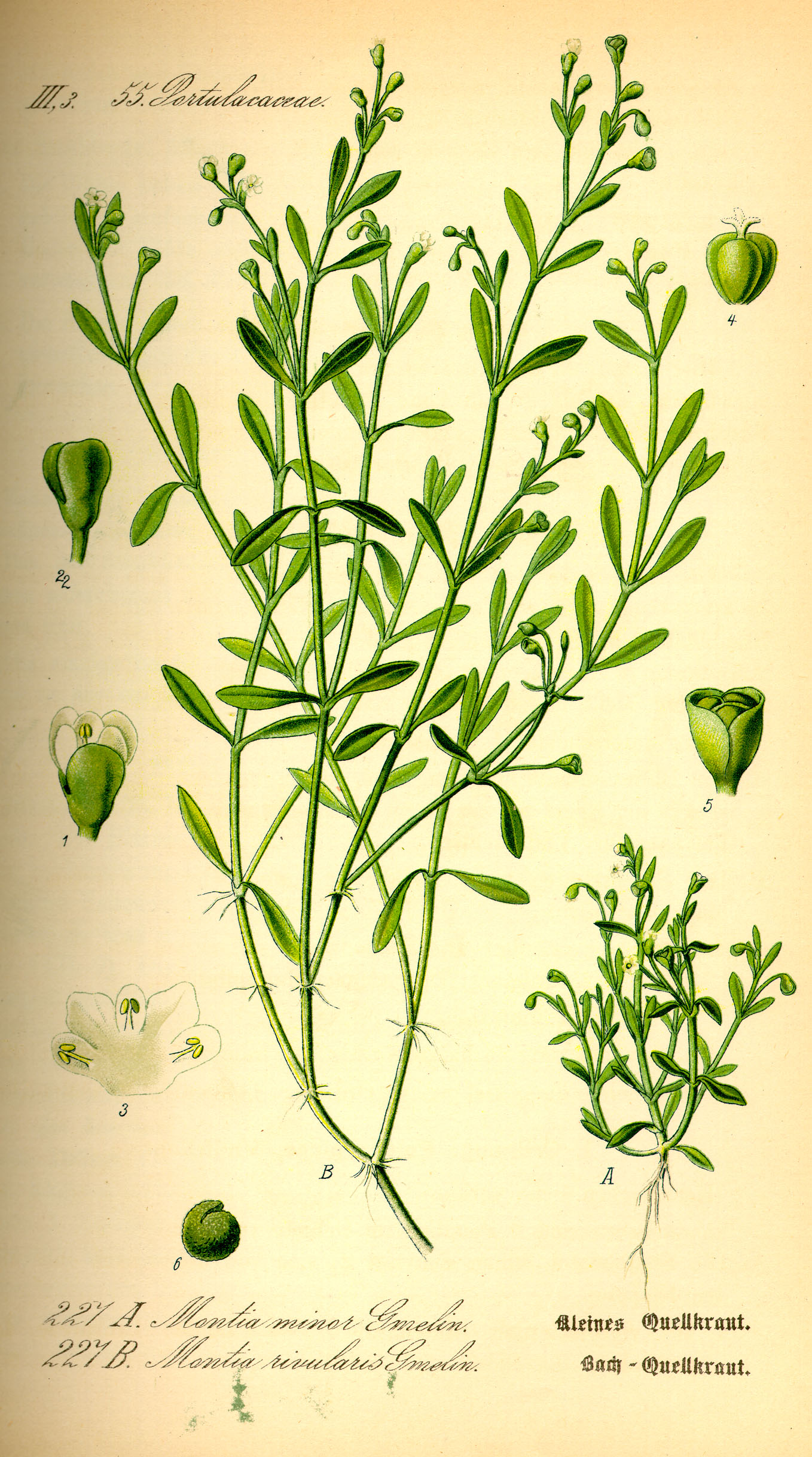
- Montia fontana

Scientific classification
- Kingdom: Plantae
- Clade: Tracheophytes
- Clade: Angiosperms
- Clade: Eudicots
- Order: Caryophyllales
- Family: Montiaceae
- Genus: Montia; L.

Species
- about 12, see text

Synonyms
- Synonyms: Cameraria Fabr.; Claytoniella Jurtzev; Crunocallis Rydb.; Laterifissum Dulac; Leptrina Raf.; Limnalsine Rydb.; Maxia Ö.Nilsson; Mona Ö.Nilsson; Montiastrum Rydb.; Naiocrene Rydb.; Neopaxia Ö.Nilsson; Paxia Ö.Nilsson

= Montia =

Genus of flowering plants

Montia is a genus of plants in the family Montiaceae. Species in this genus are known generally as miner's lettuce or water chickweed. All of the species in the genus have edible leaves. It is found worldwide, except in Asia.

Montias are known from fossilized seeds recovered from sediments of the Pleistocene Tomales Formation and from a small paleoflora at San Bruno. Further, Daniel Axelrod discussed Montia howellii as one of the biogeographically significant species comprising the Millerton paleoflora at Tomales.

The genus name of Montia is in honour of Giuseppe Monti (1682–1760), an Italian chemist and botanist. It was first described and published in Sp. Pl. on page 87 in 1753.

Montia perfoliata, now Claytonia perfoliata, the species for which the term miner's lettuce was coined, is distributed throughout the Mountain West of North America in moist soils and prefers areas which have been recently disturbed. The species got its name due to its use as a fresh salad green by miners in the 1849 California Gold Rush.

Selected species:

- Montia australasica - white purslane
- Montia bostockii - Bostock's miner's lettuce
- Montia chamissoi - water miner's lettuce, toadlily
- Montia dichotoma - dwarf miner's lettuce
- Montia diffusa - spreading miner's lettuce, branching montia
- Montia fontana - annual water miner's lettuce, water-blinks
- Montia howellii - Howell's miner's lettuce
- Montia linearis - narrowleaf miner's lettuce
- Montia parvifolia - littleleaf miner's lettuce
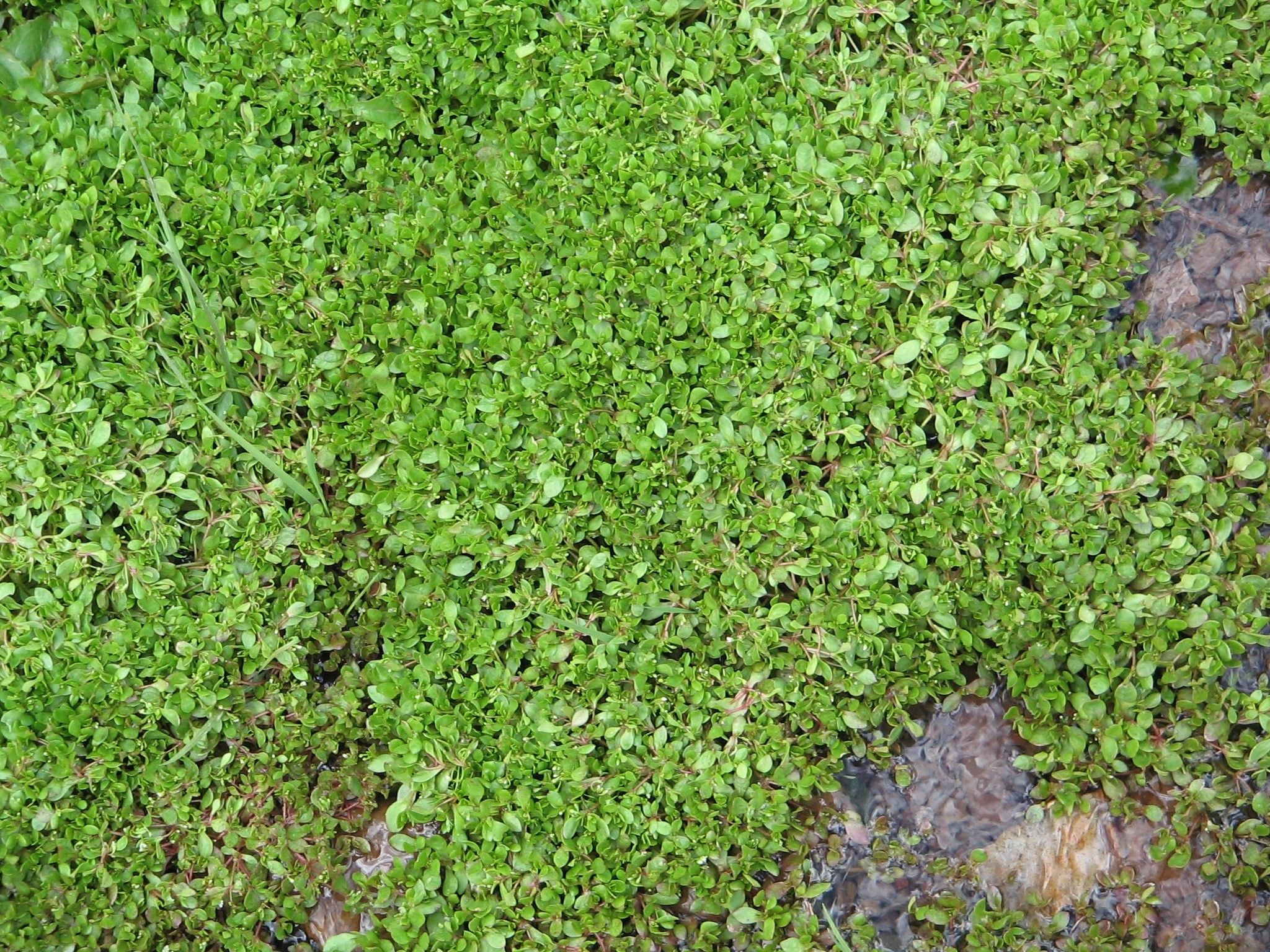
Montia fontana

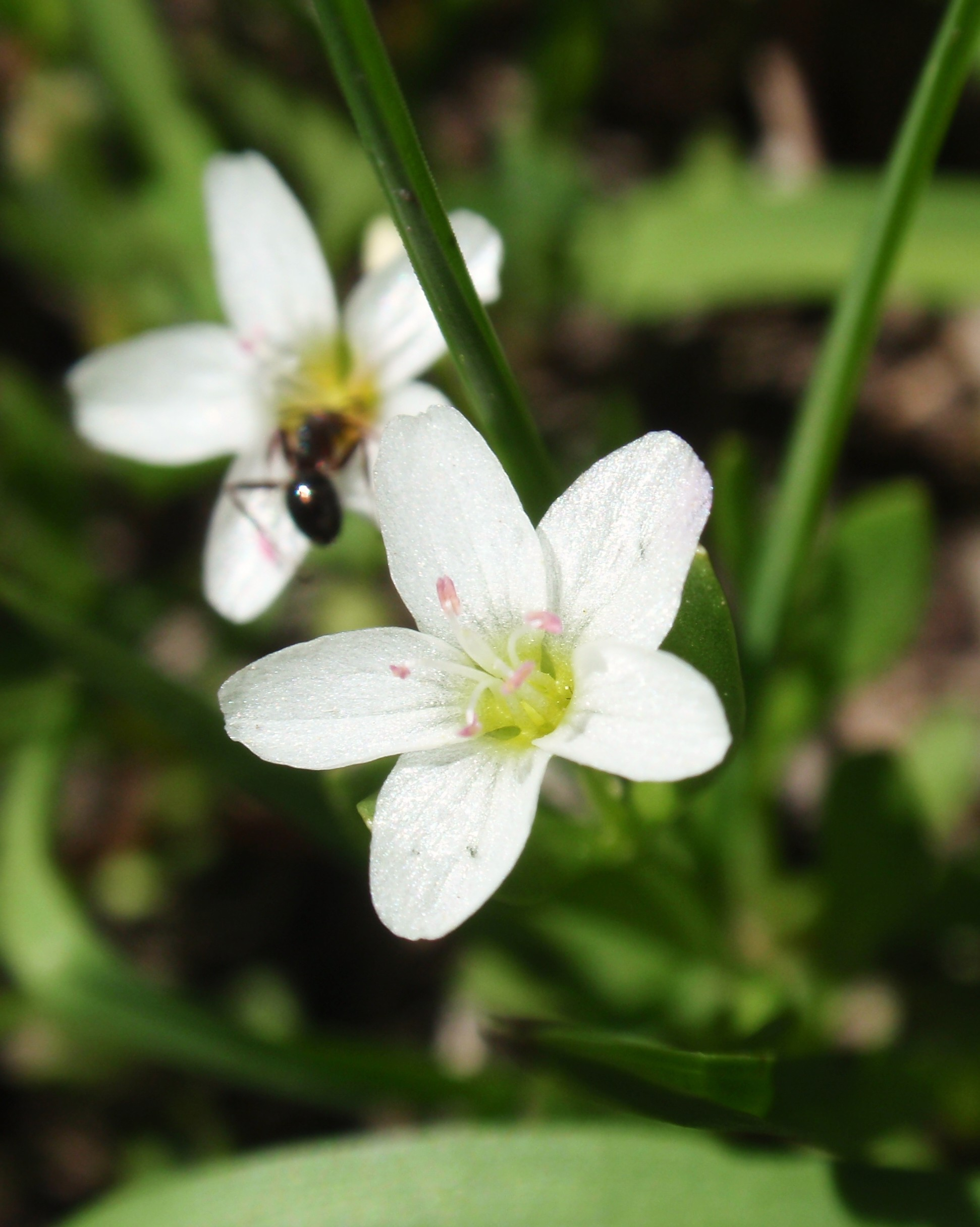
Montia chamissoi
