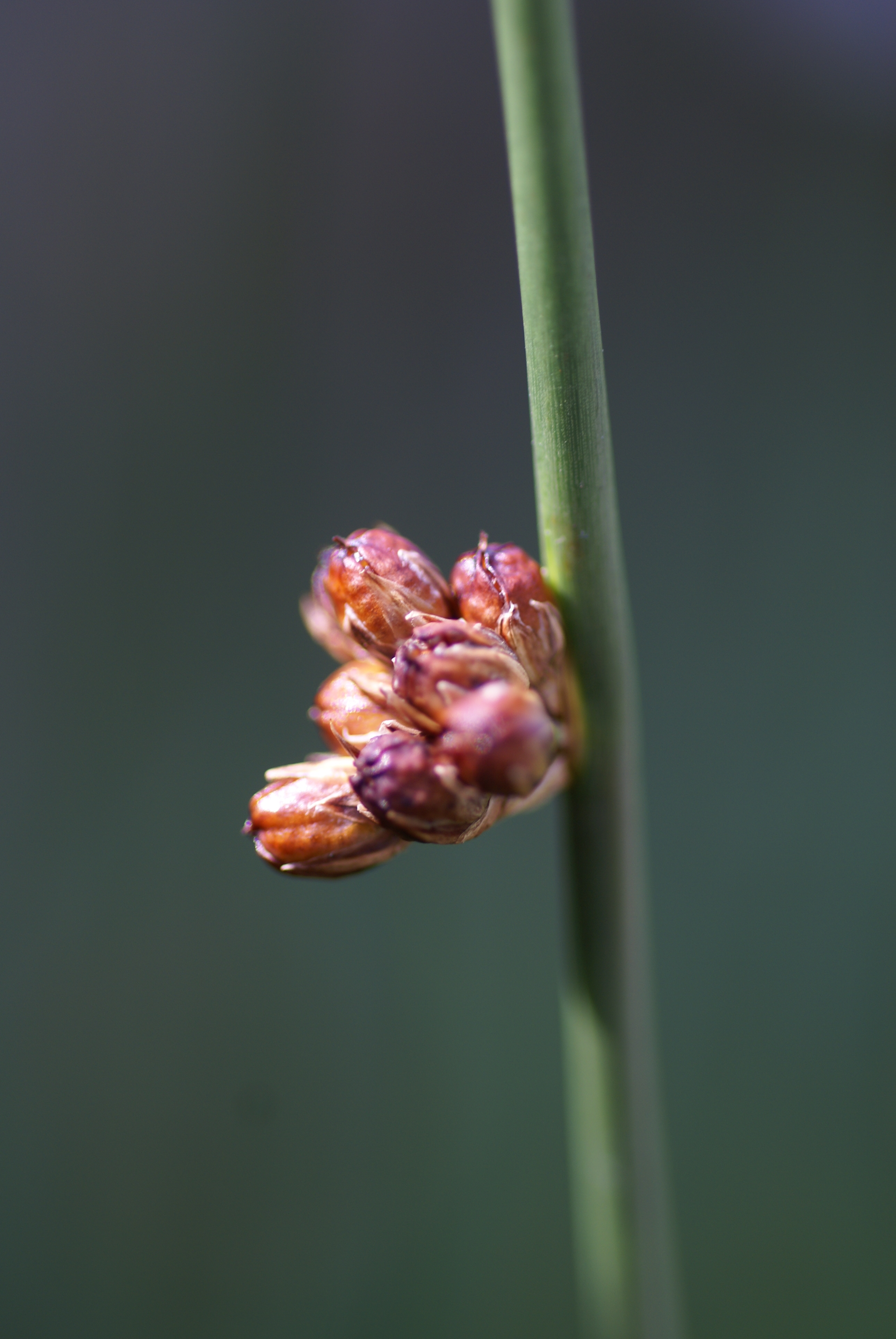
- Inflorescence
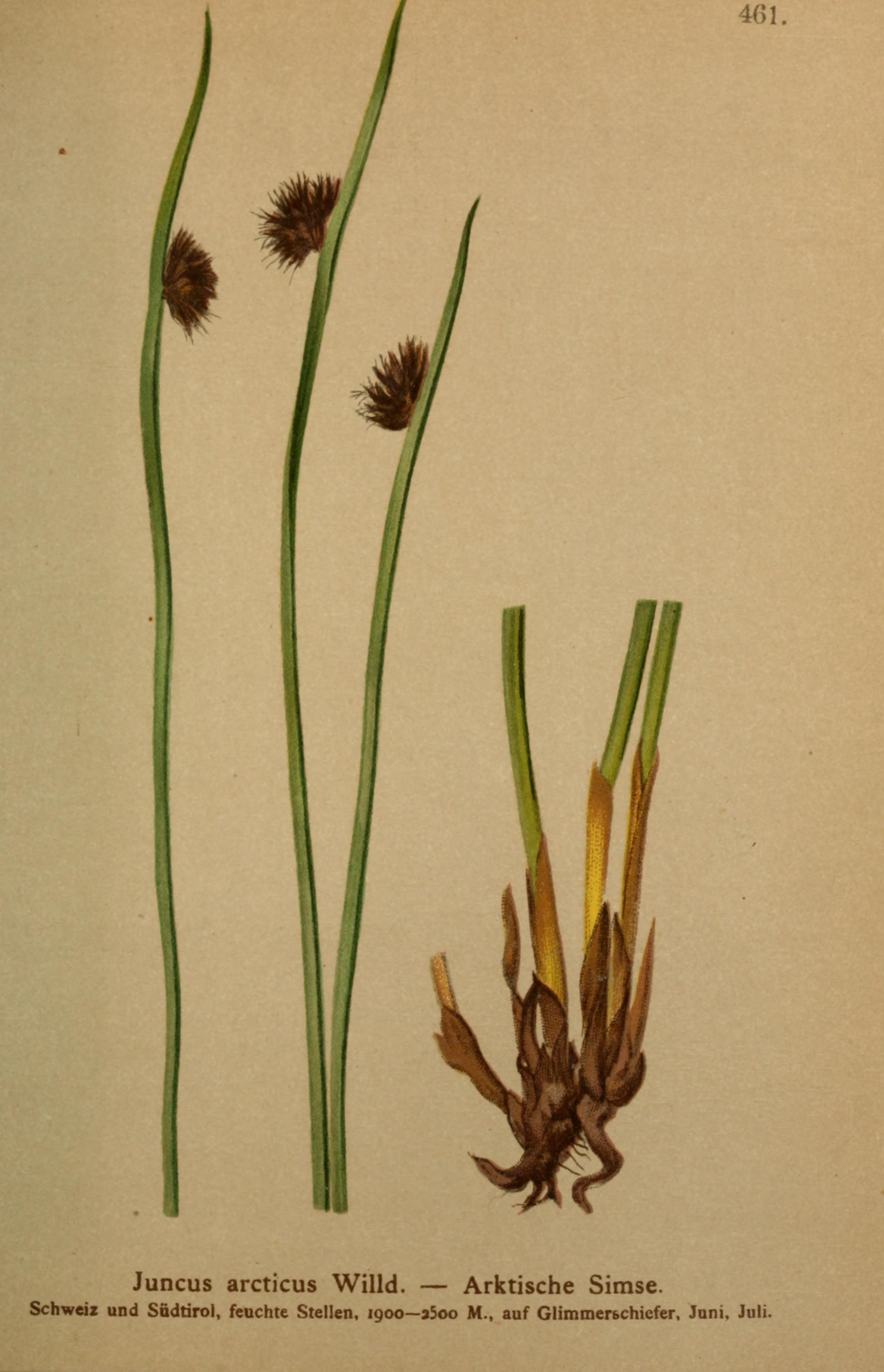
- Botanical illustration

Scientific classification
- Kingdom: Plantae
- Clade: Tracheophytes
- Clade: Angiosperms
- Clade: Monocots
- Clade: Commelinids
- Order: Poales
- Family: Juncaceae
- Genus: Juncus
- Species: J. arcticus

Binomial name
- Juncus arcticus Willd.

Synonyms
- List: Juncus acuminatus Balb.; Juncus arcticus var. alaskanus (Hultén) Novikov; Juncus arcticus var. muelleri (Trautv.) Kovt.; Juncus arcticus var. tuvinicus Polozhij; Juncus grubovii Novikov; Juncus muelleri subsp. grubovii (Novikov) Novikov; Juncus muelleri Trautv.; Juncus pauciflorus Moench ex Schleich.

= Juncus arcticus =

Species of rush

Juncus arcticus, called the arctic rush, is a species of flowering plant in the family Juncaceae, native to the subarctic and subalpine northern hemisphere. It is typically found in wetland and riparian habitats.

== Subtaxa ==
The following subspecies are currently accepted:

- Juncus arcticus subsp. alaskanus Hultén – Alaska, northwest Canada
- Juncus arcticus subsp. arcticus
- Juncus arcticus subsp. grubovii (Novikov) Novikov, Kirschner & Snogerup – Mongolia, Tuva, Yakutia
