= Giuseppe Monti =

Italian botanist and paleontologist (1682–1760)

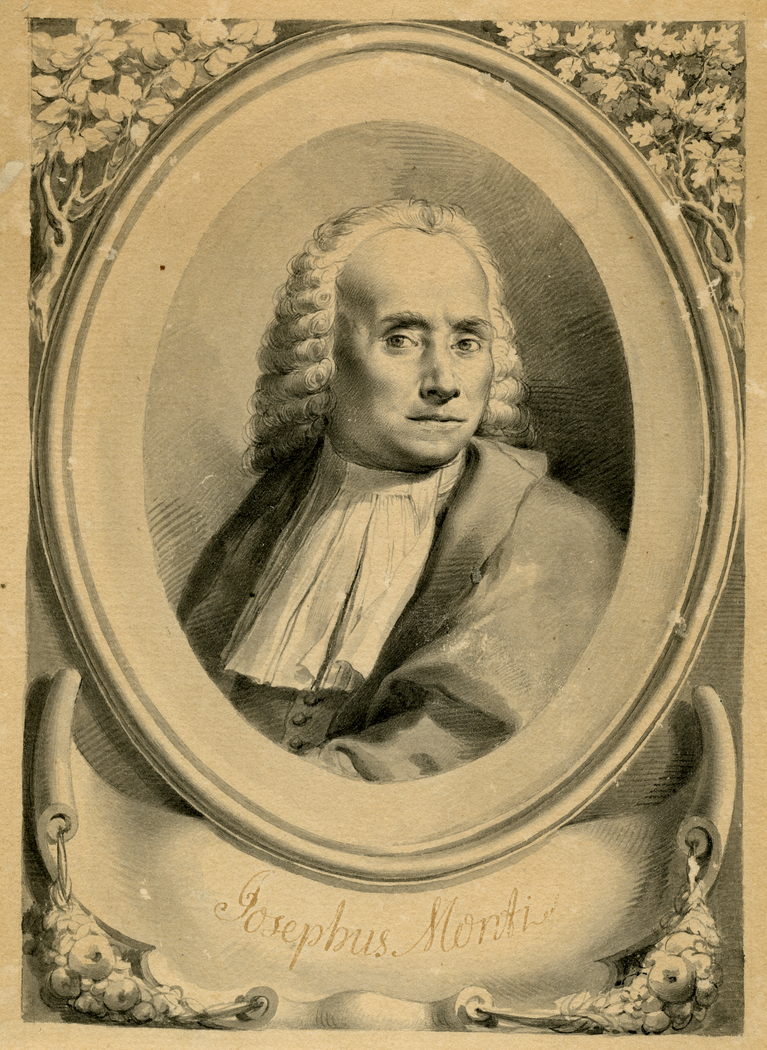
Engraved portrait

Giuseppe Monti (27 November 1682 – 29 February 1760) was an Italian chemist and botanist. He was a professor of botany and from 1722 to 1760 director of the Bologna Botanical Garden. His son Gaetano Lorenzo Monti (1712–1797) was also a botanist who continued work at the same botanical garden. His herbarium consisted of 10000 specimens representing more than 2500 species. His collection also included specimens from Aldrovandi.

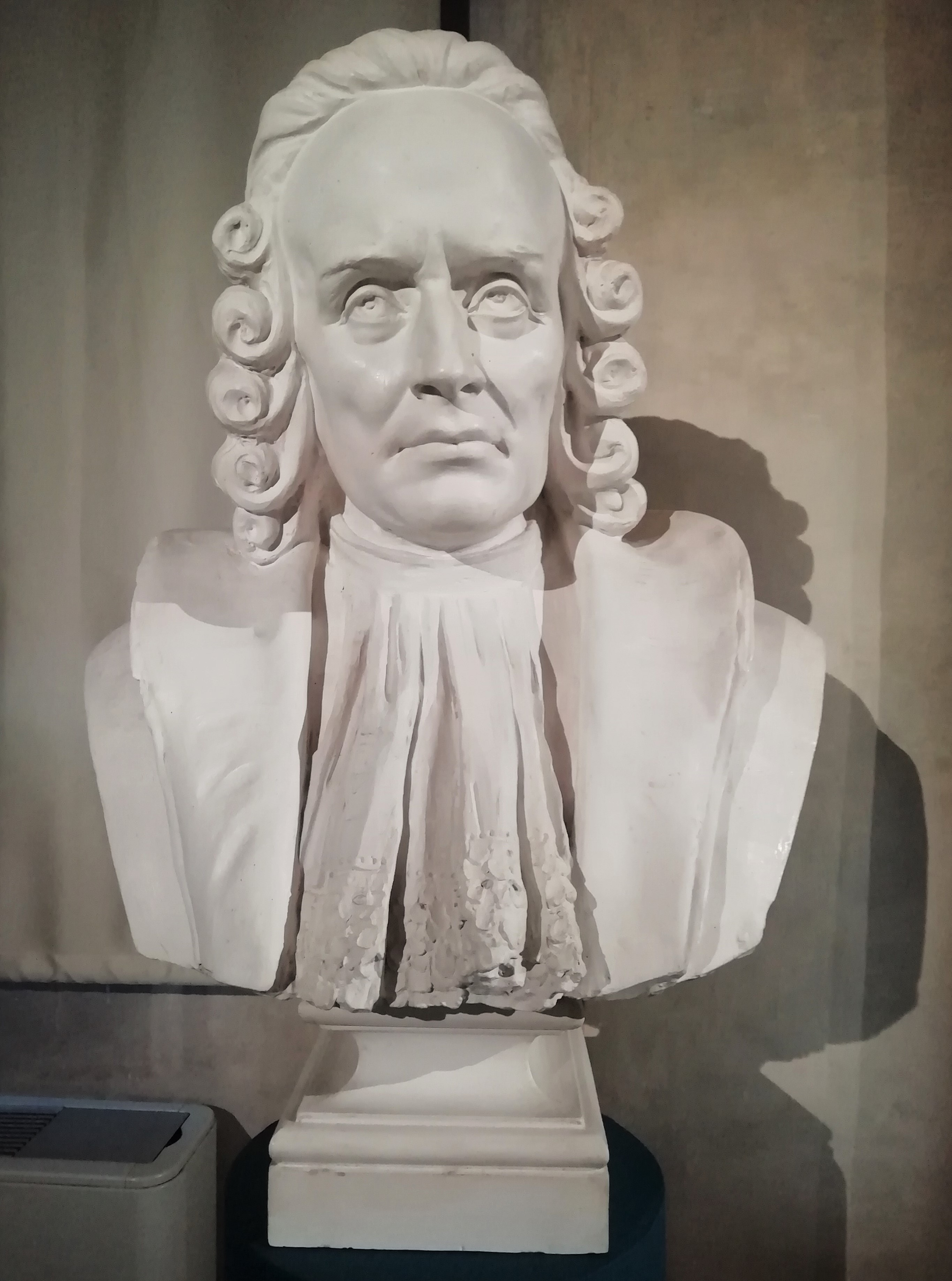
Bust in the Palazzo Poggi

Monti discovered a fossil jawbone in the Alps and used it as support for the Biblical flood and both he and his son were among the last defenders of diluvialism among the naturalists of the period.

Monti's botanical works were a source for Carl Linnaeus.

Several plant genera have been named in his honour, including in 1753, Carl Linnaeus published Montia from the family Montiaceae, Then in 1898, botanist Otto Kuntze published Montiopsis, a genus of flowering plants from South America belonging to the family Montiaceae.

== Works ==
Monti's works include:

- De monumento diluviano nuper in agro Bononiensi detecto: dissertatio in qua permultae ipsius inundationis vindiciæ, a statu terræ antediluvianae & postdiluvianæ desumptæ. Bononiae: apud Rossi & Socios, ad Rosæ insignia. 1719.
- Catalogi stirpium agri Bononiensis prodromus gramina ac hujusmodi affinia complectens... Bononiae: apud Constantinum Pisarri ad S. Michaelis insignia. 1719.
- Plantarum varii indices ad usum demonstrationum quae in Bononiensis Archigymnasii Publico Horto quotannis habentur. Iis praefixa est dissertatio ibidem habita anno MDCCXXIII ad easdem demonstrationes auspicandas 1724
- Exoticorum simplicium medicamentorum varii indices ad usum exercitationum quæ in Bononiensi scientiarum & artium singulis hebdomadis habentur. Bononiae: apud Constantinum Pisarri ad S. Michaelis insignia. 1724.
- Plantarum genera a botanicis instituta juxta Tournefortii methodum ad proprias classes relata. 1724
- Indices botanici et materiae medicae quibus plantarum genera hactenus instituta. 1753 – with his son Gaetano Lorenzo Monti
