= Tolyposporium =

Scientific classification
- Domain: Eukaryota
- Kingdom: Fungi
- Division: Basidiomycota
- Class: Ustilaginomycetes
- Order: Ustilaginales
- Family: Anthracoideaceae
- Genus: Tolyposporium; Woronin ex J. Schröt.

Type species
- Tolyposporium junci (J. Schröt.) Woronin ex J. Schröt.

Genus of fungi

Tolyposporium is a genus of fungi belonging to the family Anthracoideaceae.

The genus was described and named as Sorosporium junci by J. Schröt. in 1870, then it was republished as Tolyposporium in 1887 by Woronin ex J.Schröt.

It was originally found on Juncus bufonius in Serbia.

The genus has cosmopolitan distribution.

== Species ==
As accepted by Species Fungorum;

- Tolyposporium andropogonis Patel & N.B. Kulk. (1951)
- Tolyposporium christensenii Ragunath (1968)
- Tolyposporium evernium Syd. (1939)
- Tolyposporium globuligerum (Berk. & Broome) Ricker (1905)
- Tolyposporium isolepidis (Vánky) Vánky & M. Lutz (2009)
- Tolyposporium junci (J. Schröt.) Woronin ex J. Schröt. (1887)
- Tolyposporium kuwanoanum (Togashi & Y. Maki) Denchev & T. Denchev (2014)
- Tolyposporium montiae (Rostr.) Rostr. (1904)
- Tolyposporium neillii (G. Cunn.) Vánky & McKenzie (2001)
- Tolyposporium paspali Langdon (1948)
- Tolyposporium philippinense Syd. & P. Syd. (1912)

For 71 records of former species, see Species Fungorum.
