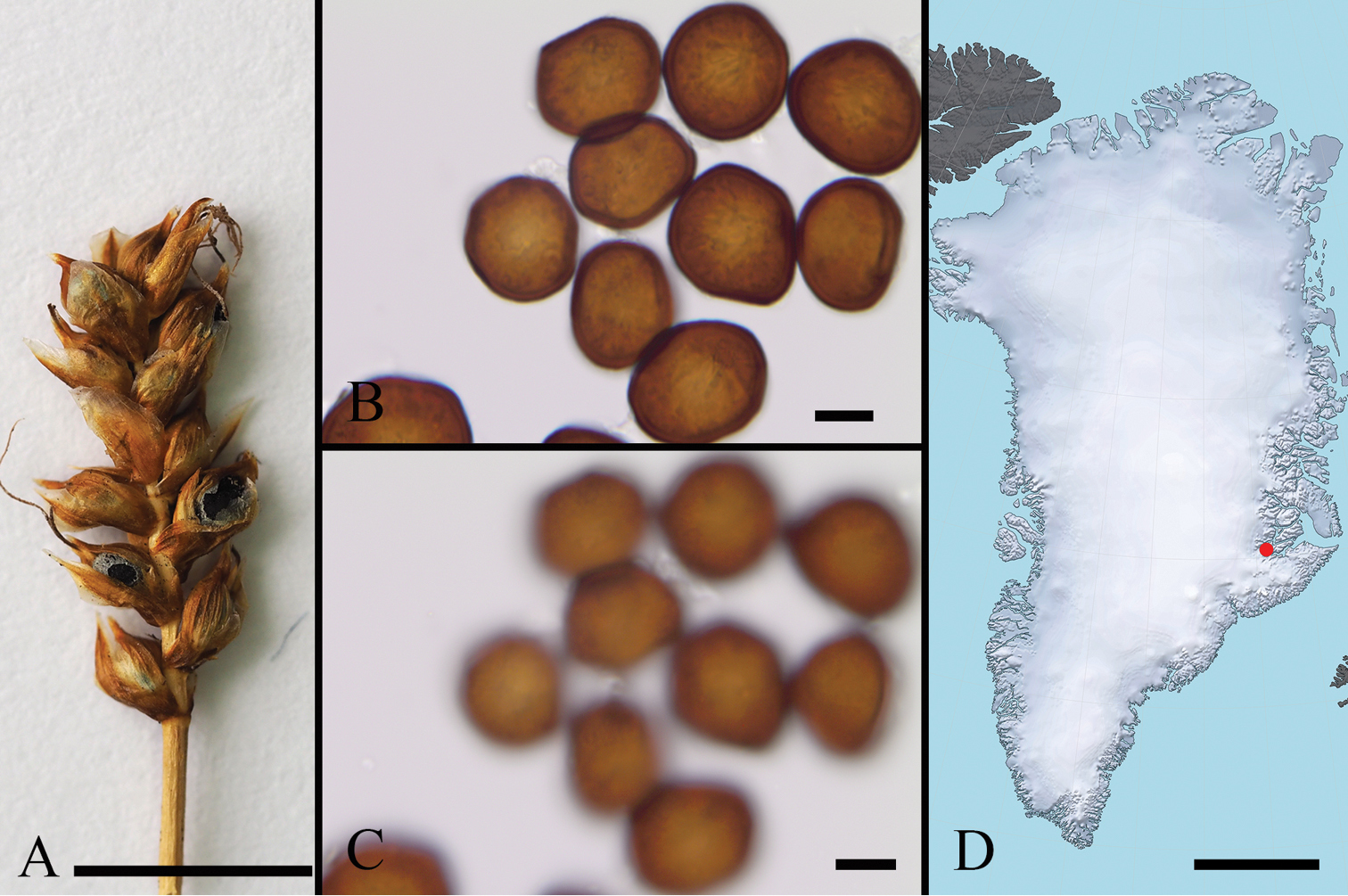
- Anthracoidea turfosa

Scientific classification
- Domain: Eukaryota
- Kingdom: Fungi
- Division: Basidiomycota
- Class: Ustilaginomycetes
- Order: Ustilaginales
- Family: Anthracoideaceae
- Genus: Anthracoidea; Bref.

Type species
- Anthracoidea caricis (Pers.) Bref., 1895

= Anthracoidea =

Genus of fungi

Anthracoidea is a genus of smut fungi belonging to the family Anthracoideaceae.

The genus has almost cosmopolitan distribution.

== Species ==
About 120 species accepted by Species Fungorum;

- Anthracoidea altera Nannf. (1979)
- Anthracoidea altiphila Vánky & M. Piepenbr. (1994)
- Anthracoidea americana (Nannf. & B. Lindeb.) Kukkonen (1963)
- Anthracoidea andina (Kukkonen) Vánky (1995)
- Anthracoidea angulata (Syd.) Boidol & Poelt (1963)
- Anthracoidea arenariae (Syd.) Nannf. (1977)
- Anthracoidea arnellii Denchev, T. Denchev & Karatygin (2011)
- Anthracoidea aspera (Liro) Kukkonen (1963)
- Anthracoidea atratae (Savile) Kukkonen (1963)
- Anthracoidea baldensis Vánky (1979)
- Anthracoidea bigelowii Nannf. (1965)
- Anthracoidea bistaminatae L. Guo (2006)
- Anthracoidea blanda Vánky & H. Alexander (2005)
- Anthracoidea blepharicarpae Denchev, T. Denchev & Kakish. (2011)
- Anthracoidea breweri Salo & Vánky (2011)
- Anthracoidea buxbaumii Kukkonen (1963)
- Anthracoidea calderi (Savile) Kukkonen (1963)
- Anthracoidea capillaris Kukkonen (1963)
- Anthracoidea caricetorum Nannf. (1979)
- Anthracoidea caricis (Pers.) Bref. (1895)
- Anthracoidea caricis-albae (Syd.) Kukkonen (1963)
- Anthracoidea caricis-grallatoriae T. Denchev, Denchev & Kakish. (2013)
- Anthracoidea caricis-meadii Savchenko, M. Lutz & Piątek (2013)
- Anthracoidea caricis-pauciflorae (Lehtola) Kukkonen (1963)
- Anthracoidea caricis-reznicekii T. Denchev & Denchev (2016)
- Anthracoidea carphae (Speg.) Vánky (1979)
- Anthracoidea caryophylleae Kukkonen (1963)
- Anthracoidea curvulae Vánky & Kukkonen (1983)
- Anthracoidea deweyanae Denchev & T. Denchev (2013)
- Anthracoidea disciformis (Liro) Piątek (2012)
- Anthracoidea dispalatae Denchev, T. Denchev & Kakish. (2011)
- Anthracoidea douglasii Nannf. (1977)
- Anthracoidea duriusculae L. Guo (2006)
- Anthracoidea eburneae Denchev & T. Denchev (2011)
- Anthracoidea echinospora (Lehtola) Kukkonen (1963)
- Anthracoidea eleocharidis Kukkonen (1964)
- Anthracoidea elynae (Syd.) Kukkonen (1963)
- Anthracoidea externa (Griffiths) Kukkonen (1963)
- Anthracoidea filamentosae L. Guo (2006)
- Anthracoidea filifoliae L. Guo (1996)
- Anthracoidea foeneae Denchev & T. Denchev (2013)
- Anthracoidea foetidae H. Zogg (1983)
- Anthracoidea fuirenae (Hasija & F.T. Wolf) Vánky (1988)
- Anthracoidea globularis Kukkonen (1963)
- Anthracoidea griseae Vánky (2011)
- Anthracoidea haematostomae L. Guo (2006)
- Anthracoidea hallerianae T. Denchev, Denchev, Begerow & Kemler (2021)
- Anthracoidea heterospora (B. Lindeb.) Kukkonen (1963)
- Anthracoidea hostianae B. Lindeb. ex Nannf. (1979)
- Anthracoidea humilis Vánky (1983)
- Anthracoidea inclusa Bref. (1912)
- Anthracoidea intercedens Nannf. (1979)
- Anthracoidea irregularis (Liro) Boidol & Poelt (1963)
- Anthracoidea japonica (Syd.) Denchev, T. Denchev & Kakish. (2013)
- Anthracoidea kanasensis H.C. Zhang & L. Guo (2004)
- Anthracoidea karii (Liro) Nannf. (1977)
- Anthracoidea kenaica (Savile) Piątek (2013)
- Anthracoidea kobresiae (Mundk.) Kukkonen (1963)
- Anthracoidea koeleriae (Mundk.) Vánky (1997)
- Anthracoidea kukkonenii Vánky (1988)
- Anthracoidea lanceolatae T. Denchev & Denchev (2013)
- Anthracoidea lasiocarpae B. Lindeb. (1963)
- Anthracoidea laxae Kukkonen (1963)
- Anthracoidea limosa (Syd.) Kukkonen (1963)
- Anthracoidea lindebergiae (Kukkonen) Kukkonen (1963)
- Anthracoidea liroi (Lehtola) Nannf. & B. Lindeb. (1965)
- Anthracoidea macranthae L. Guo & S.R. Wang (2005)
- Anthracoidea maquensis S.R. Wang (2011)
- Anthracoidea melanostachyae Denchev & T. Denchev (2011)
- Anthracoidea michelii Vánky (1979)
- Anthracoidea microsora (Syd.) Kukkonen (1963)
- Anthracoidea microspora L. Guo (1995)
- Anthracoidea misandrae Kukkonen (1963)
- Anthracoidea mulenkoi Piątek (2006)
- Anthracoidea multicaulis Vánky & Salo (2011)
- Anthracoidea nardinae (Kukkonen) Nannf. (1979)
- Anthracoidea nepalensis Kakish. & Y. Ono (1988)
- Anthracoidea obovoidea (Togashi & Y. Maki) Kakish. (1982)
- Anthracoidea obtusatae T. Denchev, Denchev, Begerow & Kemler (2023)
- Anthracoidea ortegae Kukkonen (1977)
- Anthracoidea pamiroalaica Piątek, M. Lutz & M. Nobis (2015)
- Anthracoidea paniceae Kukkonen (1963)
- Anthracoidea pannucea (Liro) Vánky (1996)
- Anthracoidea pilosae Vánky (1979)
- Anthracoidea praegracilis Salo & Vánky (2011)
- Anthracoidea pratensis (Syd.) Boidol & Poelt (1963)
- Anthracoidea pseudirregularis U. Braun (1982)
- Anthracoidea pseudofoetidae L. Guo (2006)
- Anthracoidea pseudomichelii T. Denchev & Denchev (2013)
- Anthracoidea pulicaris Kukkonen (1963)
- Anthracoidea pygmaea L. Guo (2002)
- Anthracoidea royleanae L. Guo (2006)
- Anthracoidea rupestris Kukkonen (1963)
- Anthracoidea savilei Denchev & T. Denchev (2013)
- Anthracoidea schoenus (G. Cunn.) Vánky (1979)
- Anthracoidea scirpi (J.G. Kühn) Kukkonen (1963)
- Anthracoidea scirpoideae Kukkonen (1963)
- Anthracoidea sclerotiformis (Cooke & Massee) Kukkonen (1963)
- Anthracoidea sempervirentis Vánky (1979)
- Anthracoidea setosae L. Guo (2006)
- Anthracoidea setschwanensis L. Guo (2007)
- Anthracoidea shaanxiensis L. Guo (2004)
- Anthracoidea siderostictae Kukkonen (1964)
- Anthracoidea smithii Kukkonen (1963)
- Anthracoidea songorica Vánky (2011)
- Anthracoidea stenocarpae Chleb. (2002)
- Anthracoidea striata H.C. Zhang & L. Guo (2004)
- Anthracoidea subinclusa Bref. (1895)
- Anthracoidea suedae (Sawada) Vánky (1987)
- Anthracoidea tomentosae Vánky (1979)
- Anthracoidea transberingiana Piątek (2014)
- Anthracoidea turfosa (Syd.) Kukkonen (1963)
- Anthracoidea uleana (Syd. & P. Syd.) Vánky (1997)
- Anthracoidea unciniae Vánky & C. Vánky (1995)
- Anthracoidea vankyi Nannf. (1977)
- Anthracoidea variabilis (S. Ito) Kakish. (1982)
- Anthracoidea verrucosa (Savile) Nannf. (1977)
- Anthracoidea wakatipu Vánky (2000)
- Anthracoidea xizangensis L. Guo (2006)
- Anthracoidea yunnanensis S.R. Wang & M. Piepenbr. (2002)

Former species (all Anthracoideaceae unless listed);

- A. caricis-dioicae (Lehtola) Zambett. (1978) = Cintractia caricis-dioicae
- A. caricis sensu Pennycook = Anthracoidea heterospora
- A. caricis sensu Pennycook = Anthracoidea wakatipu
- A. elynae var. nardinae Kukkonen (1963) = Anthracoidea nardinae
- A. fischeri (P. Karst.) Kukkonen (1963) = Cintractia fischeri
- A. grallatoriae Vánky (1995) = Anthracoidea japonica
- A. heterospora var. kenaica (Savile) Zambett. (1978) = Anthracoidea kenaica
- A. heterospora var. verrucosa (Savile) Zambett. (1978) = Anthracoidea verrucosa
- A. leioderma (Lagerh.) Kochman & T. Majewski (1973) = Cintractia leioderma
- A. lironis (Savile) M. Piepenbr. (2004) = Planetella lironis
- A. onumae Shirai (1917) = Clinoconidium onumae, Cryptobasidiaceae
- A. wojewodae Piątek (2011) = Anthracoidea eburneae
