= List of monocotyledons of Great Britain and Ireland =

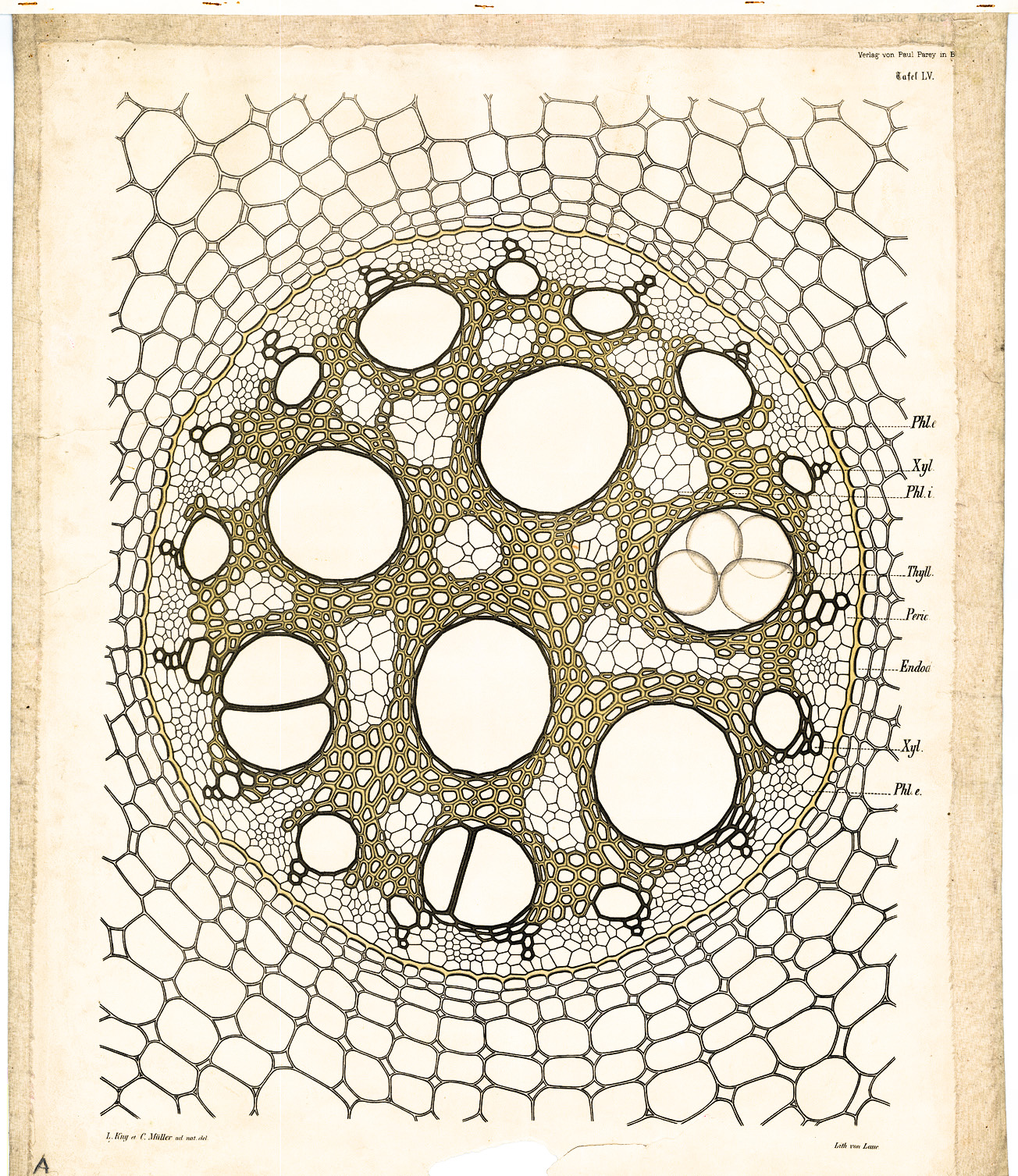
Cross-section of a monocot root. Note the lack of any pattern in the arrangement of the vascular bundles.

This page's list covers the monocotyledon plants found in Great Britain and Ireland. This clade includes grasses, lilies, orchids, irises and a wide variety of aquatic plants.

Status key: * indicates an introduced species and e indicates an extinct species.

== Order Alismatales (alismatids) ==
=== Family Butomaceae (flowering-rushes) ===
| English name | Scientific name | Status |
|---|---|---|
| Flowering rush | Butomus umbellatus | |

=== Family Alismataceae (water-plantains) ===
| English name | Scientific name | Status |
|---|---|---|
| Arrowhead | Sagittaria sagittifolia | |
| Duck-potato | Sagittaria latifolia | * |
| Canadian arrowhead | Sagittaria rigida | * |
| Narrow-leaved arrowhead | Sagittaria subulata | * |
| Lesser water-plantain | Baldellia ranunculoides | |
| Floating water-plantain | Luronium natans | |
| Water-plantain | Alisma plantago-aquatica | |
| Narrow-leaved water-plantain | Alisma lanceolatum | |
| Ribbon-leaved water-plantain | Alisma gramineum | |
| Starfruit | Damasonium alisma | |
| Frogbit | Hydrocharis morsus-ranae | |

=== Family Hydrocharitaceae (tape-grasses) ===
| English name | Scientific name | Status |
|---|---|---|
| Water-soldier | Stratiotes aloides | |
| Large-flowered waterweed | Egeria densa | * |
| Canadian waterweed | Elodea canadensis | * |
| Nuttall's waterweed | Elodea nuttallii | * |
| South American waterweed | Elodea callitrichoides | * |
| Esthwaite waterweed | Hydrilla verticillata | * |
| Curly waterweed | Lagarosiphon major | * |
| Tapegrass | Vallisneria spiralis | * |
| Slender naiad | Najas flexilis | |
| Holly-leaved naiad | Najas marina | |

=== Family Aponogetonaceae (Cape-pondweeds) ===
| English name | Scientific name | Status |
|---|---|---|
| Cape-pondweed | Aponogeton distachyos | * |

=== Family Scheuchzeriaceae (Rannoch-rush, pod grass) ===
| English name | Scientific name | Status |
|---|---|---|
| Rannoch-rush | Scheuchzeria palustris | |

=== Family Juncaginaceae (arrowgrasses) ===
| English name | Scientific name | Status |
|---|---|---|
| Marsh arrowgrass | Triglochin palustris | |
| Sea arrowgrass | Triglochin maritimum | |

=== Family Potamogetonaceae (pondweeds) ===
| English name | Scientific name | Status |
|---|---|---|
| Opposite-leaved pondweed | Groenlandia densa | |
| Broad-leaved pondweed | Potamogeton natans | |
| Bog pondweed | Potamogeton polygonifolius | |
| Fen pondweed | Potamogeton coloratus | |
| Loddon pondweed | Potamogeton nodosus | |
| Shining pondweed | Potamogeton lucens | |
| Various-leaved pondweed | Potamogeton gramineus | |
| Red pondweed | Potamogeton alpinus | |
| Long-stalked pondweed | Potamogeton praelongus | |
| Perfoliate pondweed | Potamogeton perfoliatus | |
| American pondweed | Potamogeton epihydrus | |
| Flat-stalked pondweed | Potamogeton friesii | |
| Shetland pondweed | Potamogeton rutilus | |
| Lesser pondweed | Potamogeton pusillus | |
| Blunt-leaved pondweed | Potamogeton obtusifolius | |
| Small pondweed | Potamogeton berchtoldii | |
| Hairlike pondweed | Potamogeton trichoides | |
| Grass-wrack pondweed | Potamogeton compressus | |
| Sharp-leaved pondweed | Potamogeton acutifolius | |
| Curled pondweed | Potamogeton crispus | |
| Slender-leaved pondweed | Potamogeton filiformis | |
| Fennel pondweed | Potamogeton pectinatus | |
| Horned pondweed | Zannichellia palustris | |

=== Family Ruppiaceae (widgeonweeds, ditch grasses, widgeon grass) ===
| English name | Scientific name | Status |
|---|---|---|
| Beaked tasselweed | Ruppia maritima | |
| Spiral tasselweed | Ruppia cirrhosa | |

=== Family Zosteraceae (seagrasses) ===
| English name | Scientific name | Status |
|---|---|---|
| Eelgrass | Zostera marina | |
| Narrow-leaved eelgrass | Zostera angustifolia | |
| Dwarf eelgrass | Zostera noltei | |

=== Family Araceae (arum) ===
| English name | Scientific name | Status |
|---|---|---|
| American skunk-cabbage | Lysichiton americanus | * |
| Asian skunk-cabbage | Lysichiton camtschatcensis | * |
| Bog arum | Calla palustris | * |
| Altar-lily | Zantedeschia aethiopica | * |
| Lords-and-ladies | Arum maculatum | |
| Italian lords-and-ladies | Arum italicum | |
| Dragon arum | Dracunculus vulgaris | * |
| Mousetailplant | Arisarum proboscideum | * |
| Greater duckweed | Spirodela polyrhiza | |
| Fat duckweed | Lemna gibba | |
| Common duckweed | Lemna minor | |
| Ivy-leaved duckweed | Lemna trisulca | |
| Least duckweed | Lemna minuta | * |
| Rootless duckweed | Wolffia arrhiza | |

== Order Acorales (sweet flag) ==
=== Family Acoraceae (sweet flag) ===
| English name | Scientific name | Status |
|---|---|---|
| Sweet flag | Acorus calamus | * |
| Slender sweet-flag | Acorus gramineus | * |

== Order Commelinales ==
=== Family Commelinaceae (dayflowers, spiderworts) ===
| English name | Scientific name | Status |
|---|---|---|
| Spiderwort | Tradescantia virginiana | * |
| Wandering-Jew | Tradescantia fluminensis | * |

=== Family Pontederiaceae (pickerel-weed family) ===
| English name | Scientific name | Status |
|---|---|---|
| Pickerelweed | Pontederia cordata | * |

== Order Poales ==
=== Family Eriocaulaceae (pipeworts) ===
| English name | Scientific name | Status |
|---|---|---|
| Pipewort | Eriocaulon aquaticum | |

=== Family Juncaceae (rushes) ===
| English name | Scientific name | Status |
|---|---|---|
| Heath rush | Juncus squarrosus | |
| Slender rush | Juncus tenuis | * |
| Round-fruited rush | Juncus compressus | |
| Saltmarsh rush | Juncus gerardii | |
| Three-leaved rush | Juncus trifidus | |
| Leafy rush | Juncus foliosus | |
| Toad rush | Juncus bufonius | |
| Frog rush | Juncus ambiguus | |
| Broad-leaved rush | Juncus planifolius | * |
| Dwarf rush | Juncus capitatus | |
| Blunt-flowered rush | Juncus subnodulosus | |
| Alpine rush | Juncus alpinoarticulatus | |
| Jointed rush | Juncus articulatus | |
| Sharp-flowered rush | Juncus acutiflorus | |
| Bulbous rush | Juncus bulbosus | |
| Pigmy rush | Juncus pygmaeus | |
| Two-flowered rush | Juncus biglumis | |
| Three-flowered rush | Juncus triglumis | |
| Chestnut rush | Juncus castaneus | |
| Sea rush | Juncus maritimus | |
| Sharp rush | Juncus acutus | |
| Somerset rush | Juncus subulatus | * |
| Baltic rush | Juncus balticus | |
| Thread rush | Juncus filiformis | |
| Hard rush | Juncus inflexus | |
| Soft-rush | Juncus effusus | |
| Compact rush | Juncus conglomeratus | |
| Great soft-rush | Juncus pallidus | * |
| Southern wood-rush | Luzula forsteri | |
| Hairy wood-rush | Luzula pilosa | |
| Great wood-rush | Luzula sylvatica | |
| White wood-rush | Luzula luzuloides | * |
| Field wood-rush | Luzula campestris | |
| Heath wood-rush | Luzula multiflora | |
| Fen wood-rush | Luzula pallidula | |
| Curved wood-rush | Luzula arcuata | |
| Spiked wood-rush | Luzula spicata | |

=== Family Cyperaceae (sedges) ===
| English name | Scientific name | Status |
|---|---|---|
| Common cottongrass | Eriophorum angustifolium | |
| Broad-leaved cottongrass | Eriophorum latifolium | |
| Slender cottongrass | Eriophorum gracile | |
| Hare's-tail cottongrass | Eriophorum vaginatum | |
| Cotton deergrass | Trichophorum alpinum | e |
| Deergrass | Trichophorum cespitosum | |
| Common spike-rush | Eleocharis palustris | |
| Northern spike-rush | Eleocharis austriaca | |
| Slender spike-rush | Eleocharis uniglumis | |
| Many-stalked spike-rush | Eleocharis multicaulis | |
| Few-flowered spike-rush | Eleocharis quinqueflora | |
| Needle spike-rush | Eleocharis acicularis | |
| Dwarf spike-rush | Eleocharis parvula | |
| Sea club-rush | Bolboschoenus maritimus | |
| Wood club-rush | Scirpus sylvaticus | |
| Round-headed club-rush | Scirpoides holoschoenus | |
| Common club-rush | Schoenoplectus lacustris | |
| Grey club-rush | Schoenoplectus tabernaemontani | |
| Triangular club-rush | Schoenoplectus triqueter | |
| Sharp club-rush | Schoenoplectus pungens | |
| Bristle club-rush | Isolepis setacea | |
| Slender club-rush | Isolepis cernua | |
| Floating club-rush | Eleogiton fluitans | |
| Flat-sedge | Blysmus compressus | |
| Saltmarsh flat-sedge | Blysmus rufus | |
| Galingale | Cyperus longus | |
| Pale galingale | Cyperus eragrostis | * |
| Brown galingale | Cyperus fuscus | |
| Black bog-rush | Schoenus nigricans | |
| Brown bog-rush | Schoenus ferrugineus | |
| White beak-sedge | Rhynchospora alba | |
| Brown beak-sedge | Rhynchospora fusca | |
| Great fen-sedge | Cladium mariscus | |
| False sedge | Kobresia simpliciuscula | |
| Greater tussock-sedge | Carex paniculata | |
| Fibrous tussock-sedge | Carex appropinquata | |
| Lesser tussock-sedge | Carex diandra | |
| True fox-sedge | Carex vulpina | |
| False fox-sedge | Carex otrubae | |
| American fox-sedge | Carex vulpinoidea | * |
| Spiked sedge | Carex spicata | |
| Prickly sedge | Carex muricata | |
| Grey sedge | Carex divulsa | |
| Sand sedge | Carex arenaria | |
| Brown sedge | Carex disticha | |
| String sedge | Carex chordorrhiza | |
| Divided sedge | Carex divisa | |
| Curved sedge | Carex maritima | |
| Remote sedge | Carex remota | |
| Oval sedge | Carex leporina | |
| Star sedge | Carex echinata | |
| Dioecious sedge | Carex dioica | |
| Davall's sedge | Carex davalliana | e |
| Elongated sedge | Carex elongata | |
| Hare's-foot sedge | Carex lachenalii | |
| White sedge | Carex curta | |
| Hairy sedge | Carex hirta | |
| Slender sedge | Carex lasiocarpa | |
| Lesser pond-sedge | Carex acutiformis | |
| Greater pond-sedge | Carex riparia | |
| Cyperus-like sedge | Carex pseudocyperus | |
| Bottle sedge | Carex rostrata | |
| Bladder-sedge | Carex vesicaria | |
| Russet sedge | Carex saxatilis | |
| Pendulous sedge | Carex pendula | |
| Wood-sedge | Carex sylvatica | |
| Hair sedge | Carex capillaris | |
| Thin-spiked wood-sedge | Carex strigosa | |
| Glaucous sedge | Carex flacca | |
| Carnation sedge | Carex panicea | |
| Sheathed sedge | Carex vaginata | |
| Starved wood-sedge | Carex depauperata | |
| Smooth-stalked sedge | Carex laevigata | |
| Green-ribbed sedge | Carex binervis | |
| Distant sedge | Carex distans | |
| Dotted sedge | Carex punctata | |
| Long-bracted sedge | Carex extensa | |
| Tawny sedge | Carex hostiana | |
| Large yellow-sedge | Carex flava | |
| Yellow-sedge | Carex viridula | |
| Pale sedge | Carex pallescens | |
| Fingered sedge | Carex digitata | |
| Bird's-foot sedge | Carex ornithopoda | |
| Dwarf sedge | Carex humilis | |
| Spring sedge | Carex caryophyllea | |
| Downy-fruited sedge | Carex filiformis | |
| Rare spring-sedge | Carex ericetorum | |
| Soft-leaved sedge | Carex montana | |
| Pill sedge | Carex pilulifera | |
| Scorched alpine-sedge | Carex atrofusca | |
| Bog-sedge | Carex limosa | |
| Mountain bog-sedge | Carex rariflora | |
| Tall bog-sedge | Carex magellanica | |
| Black alpine-sedge | Carex atrata | |
| Club sedge | Carex buxbaumii | |
| Close-headed alpine sedge | Carex norvegica | |
| Estuarine sedge | Carex recta | |
| Water sedge | Carex aquatilis | |
| Slender tufted-sedge | Carex acuta | |
| Three-nerved sedge | Carex trinervis | e |
| Common sedge | Carex nigra | |
| Tufted-sedge | Carex elata | |
| Stiff sedge | Carex bigelowii | |
| Bristle sedge | Carex microglochin | |
| Few-flowered sedge | Carex pauciflora | |
| Rock sedge | Carex rupestris | |
| Flea sedge | Carex pulicaris | |

=== Family Poaceae (grasses) ===
| English name | Scientific name | Status |
|---|---|---|
| Indian fountain-bamboo | Yushania anceps | * |
| Dwarf bamboo | Pleioblastus pygmaeus | * |
| Broad-leaved bamboo | Sasa palmata | * |
| Veitch's bamboo | Sasa veitchii | * |
| Hairy bamboo | Sasaella ramosa | * |
| Arrow bamboo | Pseudosasa japonica | * |
| Square-stemmed bamboo | Chimonobambusa quadrangularis | * |
| Cut-grass | Leersia oryzoides | |
| Mat-grass | Nardus stricta | |
| American needle-grass | Stipa neesiana | * |
| Smilo-grass | Oryzopsis miliacea | * |
| Wood millet | Milium effusum | |
| Early millet | Milium vernale | |
| Meadow fescue | Festuca pratensis | |
| Tall fescue | Festuca arundinacea | |
| Giant fescue | Festuca gigantea | |
| Wood fescue | Festuca altissima | |
| Various-leaved fescue | Festuca heterophylla | * |
| Rush-leaved fescue | Festuca arenaria | |
| Red fescue | Festuca rubra | |
| Sheep's-fescue | Festuca ovina | |
| Viviparous sheep's-fescue | Festuca vivipara | |
| Fine-leaved sheep's-fescue | Festuca filiformis | |
| Breton fescue | Festuca armoricana | |
| Huon's fescue | Festuca huonii | |
| Confused fescue | Festuca lemanii | |
| Blue fescue | Festuca longifolia | |
| Hard fescue | Festuca brevipila | |
| Perennial rye-grass | Lolium perenne | |
| Italian rye-grass | Lolium multiflorum | * |
| Dune fescue | Vulpia fasciculata | |
| Squirreltail fescue | Vulpia bromoides | |
| Rat's-tail fescue | Vulpia myuros | |
| Bearded fescue | Vulpia ciliata | |
| Mat-grass fescue | Vulpia unilateralis | |
| Crested dog's-tail | Cynosurus cristatus | |
| Rough dog's-tail | Cynosurus echinatus | * |
| Common saltmarsh-grass | Puccinellia maritima | |
| Reflexed saltmarsh-grass | Puccinellia distans | |
| Borrer's saltmarsh-grass | Puccinellia fasciculata | |
| Stiff saltmarsh-grass | Puccinellia rupestris | |
| Quaking-grass | Briza media | |
| Lesser quaking-grass | Briza minor | * |
| Greater quaking-grass | Briza maxima | * |
| Early meadow-grass | Poa infirma | |
| Annual meadow-grass | Poa annua | |
| Rough meadow-grass | Poa trivialis | |
| Spreading meadow-grass | Poa humilis | |
| Smooth meadow-grass | Poa pratensis | |
| Narrow-leaved meadow-grass | Poa angustifolia | |
| Broad-leaved meadow-grass | Poa chaixii | * |
| Wavy meadow-grass | Poa flexuosa | |
| Flattened meadow-grass | Poa compressa | |
| Swamp meadow-grass | Poa palustris | * |
| Glaucous meadow-grass | Poa glauca | |
| Wood meadow-grass | Poa nemoralis | |
| Bulbous meadow-grass | Poa bulbosa | |
| Alpine meadow-grass | Poa alpina | |
| Tussac-grass | Poa flabellata | * |
| Cock's-foot | Dactylis glomerata | |
| Slender cock's-foot | Dactylis polygama | * |
| Whorl-grass | Catabrosa aquatica | |
| Fern-grass | Catapodium rigidum | |
| Sea fern-grass | Catapodium marinum | |
| Blue moor-grass | Sesleria caerulea | |
| Hard-grass | Parapholis strigosa | |
| Curved hard-grass | Parapholis incurva | |
| Reed sweet-grass | Glyceria maxima | |
| Floating sweet-grass | Glyceria fluitans | |
| Small sweet-grass | Glyceria declinata | |
| Plicate sweet-grass | Glyceria notata | |
| Mountain melick | Melica nutans | |
| Wood melick | Melica uniflora | |
| Downy oat-grass | Helictotrichon pubescens | |
| Meadow oat-grass | Helictotrichon pratense | |
| False oat-grass | Arrhenatherum elatius | |
| Slender oat | Avena barbata | * |
| Bristle oat | Avena strigosa | * |
| Wild-oat | Avena fatua | * |
| Winter wild-oat | Avena sterilis | * |
| Oat | Avena sativa | * |
| French oat-grass | Gaudinia fragilis | * |
| Yellow oat-grass | Trisetum flavescens | |
| Somerset hair-grass | Koeleria vallesiana | |
| Crested hair-grass | Koeleria macrantha | |
| Tufted hair-grass | Deschampsia cespitosa | |
| Bog hair-grass | Deschampsia setacea | |
| Wavy hair-grass | Deschampsia flexuosa | |
| Yorkshire-fog | Holcus lanatus | |
| Creeping soft-grass | Holcus mollis | |
| Grey hair-grass | Corynephorus canescens | |
| Silver hair-grass | Aira caryophyllea | |
| Early hair-grass | Aira praecox | |
| Holy-grass | Hierochloe odorata | |
| Sweet vernal-grass | Anthoxanthum odoratum | |
| Annual vernal-grass | Anthoxanthum aristatum | * |
| Reed canary-grass | Phalaris arundinacea | |
| Bulbous canary-grass | Phalaris aquatica | * |
| Canary-grass | Phalaris canariensis | * |
| Lesser canary-grass | Phalaris minor | * |
| Awned canary-grass | Phalaris paradoxa | * |
| Common bent | Agrostis capillaris | |
| Black bent | Agrostis gigantea | |
| Highland bent | Agrostis castellana | * |
| Creeping bent | Agrostis stolonifera | |
| Blown-grass | Agrostis avenacea | * |
| Bristle bent | Agrostis curtisii | |
| Velvet bent | Agrostis canina | |
| Brown bent | Agrostis vinealis | |
| Rough bent | Agrostis scabra | * |
| Wood small-reed | Calamagrostis epigejos | |
| Purple small-reed | Calamagrostis canescens | |
| Scandinavian small-reed | Calamagrostis purpurea | |
| Narrow small-reed | Calamagrostis stricta | |
| Scottish small-reed | Calamagrostis scotica | |
| Marram | Ammophila arenaria | |
| American marram | Ammophila breviligulata | * |
| Nit-grass | Gastridium ventricosum | |
| Hare's-tail | Lagurus ovatus | * |
| Loose silky-bent | Apera spica-venti | |
| Dense silky-bent | Apera interrupta | |
| Early sand-grass | Mibora minima | |
| Annual beard-grass | Polypogon monspeliensis | |
| Water bent | Polypogon viridis | * |
| Meadow foxtail | Alopecurus pratensis | |
| Marsh foxtail | Alopecurus geniculatus | |
| Bulbous foxtail | Alopecurus bulbosus | |
| Orange foxtail | Alopecurus aequalis | |
| Alpine foxtail | Alopecurus borealis | |
| Black-grass | Alopecurus myosuroides | |
| American slough-grass | Beckmannia syzigachne | * |
| Timothy-grass | Phleum pratense | |
| Smaller cat's-tail | Phleum bertolonii | |
| Alpine cat's-tail | Phleum alpinum | |
| Purple-stem cat's-tail | Phleum phleoides | |
| Sand cat's-tail | Phleum arenarium | |
| Field brome | Bromus arvensis | * |
| Meadow brome | Bromus commutatus | |
| Brome | Bromus racemosus | |
| Soft-brome | Bromus hordeaceus | |
| Slender soft-brome | Bromus lepidus | * |
| Interrupted brome | Bromus interruptus | e |
| Rye brome | Bromus secalinus | * |
| Smith's brome | Bromus pseudosecalinus | * |
| Hairy-brome | Bromopsis ramosa | |
| Lesser hairy-brome | Bromopsis benekenii | |
| Upright brome | Bromopsis erecta | |
| Hungarian brome | Bromopsis inermis | * |
| Great brome | Anisantha diandra | * |
| Ripgut brome | Anisantha rigida | * |
| Barren brome | Anisantha sterilis | |
| Drooping brome | Anisantha tectorum | * |
| Compact brome | Anisantha madritensis | * |
| California brome | Ceratochloa carinata | * |
| Western brome | Ceratochloa marginata | * |
| Rescue brome | Ceratochloa cathartica | * |
| Tor-grass | Brachypodium pinnatum | |
| False brome | Brachypodium sylvaticum | |
| Bearded couch | Elymus caninus | |
| Common couch | Elytrigia repens | |
| Sea couch | Elytrigia atherica | |
| Sand couch | Elytrigia juncea | |
| Lyme-grass | Leymus arenarius | |
| Wood barley | Hordelymus europaeus | |
| Two-rowed barley | Hordeum distichon | * |
| Wall barley | Hordeum murinum | |
| Foxtail barley | Hordeum jubatum | * |
| Meadow barley | Hordeum secalinum | |
| Sea barley | Hordeum marinum | |
| Bread wheat | Triticum aestivatum | * |
| Heath-grass | Danthonia decumbens | |
| Pampas-grass | Cortaderia selloana | * |
| Purple moor-grass | Molinia caerulea | |
| Common reed | Phragmites australis | |
| African love-grass | Eragrostis curvula | * |
| Small love-grass | Eragrostis minor | * |
| Bermuda-grass | Cynodon dactylon | * |
| African Bermuda-grass | Cynodon incompletus | * |
| Small cord-grass | Spartina maritima | |
| Common cord-grass | Spartina anglica | |
| Smooth cordgrass | Spartina alterniflora | * |
| Prairie cord-grass | Spartina pectinata | * |
| Cockspur | Echinochloa crus-galli | * |
| Water finger-grass | Paspalum distichum | * |
| Green bristle-grass | Setaria viridis | * |
| Smooth finger-grass | Digitaria ischaemum | * |
| Johnson grass | Sorghum halepense | * |

=== Family Typhaceae (cattail family) ===
| English name | Scientific name | Status |
|---|---|---|
| Branched bur-reed | Sparganium erectum | |
| Unbranched bur-reed | Sparganium emersum | |
| Floating bur-reed | Sparganium angustifolium | |
| Least bur-reed | Sparganium natans | |
| Bulrush | Typha latifolia | |
| Lesser bulrush | Typha angustifolia | |

=== Family Bromeliaceae (bromeliads) ===
| English name | Scientific name | Status |
|---|---|---|
| Rhodostachys | Fascicularia bicolor | * |
| Tresco rhodostachys | Ochagavia carnea | * |

== Order Asparagales (asparagoid lilies) ==
=== Family Asphodelaceae (asphodel family) ===
| English name | Scientific name | Status |
|---|---|---|
| Kerry lily | Simethis planifolia | |
| Orange day-lily | Hemerocallis fulva | * |
| Yellow day-lily | Hemerocallis lilioasphodelus | * |
| Red-hot-poker | Kniphofia uvaria | * |
| Greater red-hot-poker | Kniphofia praecox | * |
| New Zealand flax | Phormium tenax | * |
| Lesser New Zealand flax | Phormium colensoi | * |
| Scottish asphodel | Tofieldia pusilla | |
| Bog asphodel | Narthecium ossifragum | |
| White asphodel | Asphodelus albus | * |

=== Family Asparagaceae (asparagus family) ===
| English name | Scientific name | Status |
|---|---|---|
| Lily-of-the-valley | Convallaria majalis | |
| Solomon's-seal | Polygonatum multiflorum | |
| Angular Solomon's-seal | Polygonatum odoratum | |
| Whorled Solomon's-seal | Polygonatum verticillatum | |
| May lily | Maianthemum bifolium | |
| Reineckea | Reineckea carnea | * |
| Spiked Star-of-Bethlehem | Ornithogalum pyrenaicum | |
| Star-of-Bethlehem | Ornithogalum umbellatum | |
| Drooping Star-of-Bethlehem | Ornithogalum nutans | * |
| Alpine squill | Scilla bifolia | * |
| Greek squill | Scilla messeniaca | * |
| Siberian squill | Scilla siberica | * |
| Spring squill | Scilla verna | |
| Pyrenean squill | Scilla liliohyacinthus | * |
| Portuguese squill | Scilla peruviana | * |
| Autumn squill | Scilla autumnalis | |
| Italian bluebell | Hyacinthoides italica | * |
| Bluebell | Hyacinthoides non-scripta | |
| Spanish bluebell | Hyacinthoides hispanica | * |
| Hyacinth | Hyacinthus orientalis | * |
| Glory-of-the-snow | Chionodoxa forbesii | * |
| Lesser glory-of-the-snow | Chionodoxa sardensis | * |
| Grape-hyacinth | Muscari neglectum | * |
| Garden grape-hyacinth | Muscari armeniacum | * |
| Compact grape-hyacinth | Muscari botryoides | * |
| Tassel grape-hyacinth | Leopoldia comosa | * |
| Wild asparagus | Asparagus officinalis | |
| Butcher's-broom | Ruscus aculeatus | |
| Spineless butcher's-broom | Ruscus hypoglossum | * |
| Curved-leaved Spanish-dagger | Yucca gloriosa var. tristis | * |
| Centuryplant | Agave americana | * |
| Cabbage-palm | Cordyline australis | * |

=== Family Amaryllidaceae (amaryllis family) ===
| English name | Scientific name | Status |
|---|---|---|
| Chives | Allium schoenoprasum | |
| American garlic | Allium unifolium | * |
| Rosy garlic | Allium roseum | * |
| Neapolitan garlic | Allium neapolitanum | * |
| Hairy garlic | Allium subhirsutum | * |
| Yellow garlic | Allium moly | * |
| Three-cornered garlic | Allium triquetrum | * |
| Italian garlic | Allium pendulinum | * |
| Few-flowered garlic | Allium paradoxum | * |
| Ramsons | Allium ursinum | |
| Field garlic | Allium oleraceum | |
| Keeled garlic | Allium carinatum | * |
| Wild leek | Allium ampeloprasum | |
| Sand leek | Allium scorodoprasum | |
| Round-headed leek | Allium sphaerocephalon | |
| Wild onion | Allium vineale | |
| Broad-leaved leek | Allium nigrum | * |
| Honey garlic | Nectaroscordum siculum | * |
| Honeybells | Nothoscordum borbonicum | * |
| African lily | Agapanthus praecox | * |
| Spring starflower | Tristagma uniflorum | * |
| Jersey lily | Amaryllis belladonna | * |
| Winter daffodil | Sternbergia lutea | * |
| Summer snowflake | Leucojum aestivum | |
| Spring snowflake | Leucojum vernum | |
| Snowdrop | Galanthus nivalis | * |
| Greater snowdrop | Galanthus elwesii | * |
| Caucasian snowdrop | Galanthus caucasicus | * |
| Pleated snowdrop | Galanthus plicatus | * |
| Bunch-flowered daffodil | Narcissus tazetta | * |
| Paper-white daffodil | Narcissus papyraceus | * |
| Pheasant's-eye daffodil | Narcissus poeticus | * |
| Hoop-petticoat daffodil | Narcissus bulbocodium | * |
| Daffodil | Narcissus pseudonarcissus | |
| Cyclamen-flowered daffodil | Narcissus cyclamineus | * |

=== Family Iridaceae (iris family) ===
| English name | Scientific name | Status |
|---|---|---|
| Blue-eyed-grass | Sisyrinchium bermudiana | |
| American blue-eyed-grass | Sisyrinchium montanum | * |
| Yellow-eyed-grass | Sisyrinchium californicum | * |
| Veined yellow-eyed-grass | Sisyrinchium laxum | * |
| Pale yellow-eyed-grass | Sisyrinchium striatum | * |
| Blue corn-lily | Aristea ecklonii | * |
| Snake's-head iris | Hermodactylus tuberosus | * |
| Bearded iris | Iris germanica | * |
| Siberian iris | Iris sibirica | * |
| Yellow iris | Iris pseudacorus | |
| Purple iris | Iris versicolor | * |
| Japanese iris | Iris ensata | * |
| Blue iris | Iris spuria | * |
| Turkish iris | Iris orientalis | * |
| Stinking iris | Iris foetidissima | |
| English iris | Iris latifolia | * |
| Spanish iris | Iris xiphium | * |
| Bugle-lily | Watsonia borbonica | * |
| Sand crocus | Romulea columnae | |
| Oniongrass | Romulea rosea | * |
| Spring crocus | Crocus vernus | * |
| Early crocus | Crocus tommasinianus | * |
| Autumn crocus | Crocus nudiflorus | * |
| Kotschy's crocus | Crocus kotschyanus | * |
| Sieber's crocus | Crocus sieberi | * |
| Golden crocus | Crocus chrysanthus | * |
| Pure yellow crocus | Crocus flavus | * |
| Bieberstein's crocus | Crocus speciosus | * |
| Hairy crocus | Crocus pulchellus | * |
| Wild gladiolus | Gladiolus illyricus | |
| Eastern gladiolus | Gladiolus communis | * |
| Red corn-lily | Ixia campanulata | * |
| Tubular corn-lily | Ixia paniculata | * |
| Plain harlequinflower | Sparaxis grandiflora | * |
| Freesia | Freesia x hybrida | * |
| Aunt-Eliza | Crocosmia paniculata | * |
| Giant montbretia | Crocosmia masoniorum | * |
| Potts' montbretia | Crocosmia pottsii | * |
| Chasmanthe | Chasmanthe bicolor | * |

=== Family Orchidaceae (orchid family) ===
| English name | Scientific name | Status |
|---|---|---|
| Lady's-slipper | Cypripedium calceolus | |
| White helleborine | Cephalanthera damasonium | |
| Narrow-leaved helleborine | Cephalanthera longifolia | |
| Red helleborine | Cephalanthera rubra | |
| Marsh helleborine | Epipactis palustris | |
| Dark-red helleborine | Epipactis atrorubens | |
| Violet helleborine | Epipactis purpurata | |
| Broad-leaved helleborine | Epipactis helleborine | |
| Young's helleborine | Epipactis youngiana | |
| Narrow-lipped helleborine | Epipactis leptochila | |
| Green-flowered helleborine | Epipactis phyllanthes | |
| Ghost orchid | Epipogium aphyllum | |
| Bird's-nest orchid | Neottia nidus-avis | |
| Common twayblade | Neottia ovata | |
| Lesser twayblade | Neottia cordata | |
| Autumn lady's-tresses | Spiranthes spiralis | |
| Summer lady's-tresses | Spiranthes aestivalis | e |
| Irish lady's-tresses | Spiranthes romanzoffiana | |
| Creeping lady's-tresses | Goodyera repens | |
| Fen orchid | Liparis loeselii | |
| Bog orchid | Hammarbya paludosa | |
| Coralroot orchid | Corallorrhiza trifida | |
| Musk orchid | Herminium monorchis | |
| Greater butterfly-orchid | Platanthera chlorantha | |
| Lesser butterfly-orchid | Platanthera bifolia | |
| Pyramidal orchid | Anacamptis pyramidalis | |
| Small-white orchid | Pseudorchis albida | |
| Fragrant orchid | Gymnadenia conopsea | |
| Frog orchid | Coeloglossum viride | |
| Common spotted-orchid | Dactylorhiza fuchsii | |
| Heath spotted-orchid | Dactylorhiza maculata | |
| Early marsh-orchid | Dactylorhiza incarnata | |
| Southern marsh-orchid | Dactylorhiza praetermissa | |
| Northern marsh-orchid | Dactylorhiza purpurella | |
| Western marsh-orchid | Dactylorhiza majalis | |
| Narrow-leaved marsh-orchid | Dactylorhiza traunsteineri | |
| Lapland marsh-orchid | Dactylorhiza lapponica | |
| Dense-flowered orchid | Neotinea maculata | |
| Loose-flowered orchid | Orchis laxiflora | |
| Early-purple orchid | Orchis mascula | |
| Green-winged orchid | Orchis morio | |
| Burnt orchid | Orchis ustulata | |
| Lady orchid | Orchis purpurea | |
| Military orchid | Orchis militaris | |
| Monkey orchid | Orchis simia | |
| Man orchid | Aceras anthropophorum | |
| Lizard orchid | Himantoglossum hircinum | |
| Fly orchid | Ophrys insectifera | |
| Early spider-orchid | Ophrys sphegodes | |
| Bee orchid | Ophrys apifera | |
| Late spider-orchid | Ophrys fuciflora | |

== Order Liliales ==
=== Family Colchicaceae (colchicum family) ===
| English name | Scientific name | Status |
|---|---|---|
| Meadow saffron | Colchicum autumnale | |

=== Family Liliaceae (true lilies) ===
| English name | Scientific name | Status |
|---|---|---|
| Snowdon lily | Gagea serotina (syn. Lloydia serotina) | |
| Yellow Star-of-Bethlehem | Gagea lutea | |
| Early Star-of-Bethlehem | Gagea bohemica | |
| Wild tulip | Tulipa sylvestris | * |
| Cretan tulip | Tulipa saxatilis | * |
| Garden tulip | Tulipa gesneriana | * |
| Fritillary | Fritillaria meleagris | * |
| Martagon lily | Lilium martagon | * |
| Pyrenean lily | Lilium pyrenaicum | * |

=== Family Melanthiaceae (bunchflower family) ===
| English name | Scientific name | Status |
|---|---|---|
| Herb-paris | Paris quadrifolia | |

=== Family Alstroemeriaceae (alstroemer family) ===
| English name | Scientific name | Status |
|---|---|---|
| Peruvian lily | Alstroemeria aurea | * |
| Chilean-iris | Libertia chilensis (syns. L. formosa, L. elegans) | * |

== Order Dioscoreales ==
=== Family Dioscoreaceae (yam family) ===
| English name | Scientific name | Status |
|---|---|---|
| Black bryony | Dioscorea communis | |

== See also ==
- Flora of Great Britain
- Flora of Ireland
