= Cobra lily =

Cobra lily is the common name of several plants, none of which are members of the lily family. The name derives from the resemblance of the flower to the hood of a cobra.

- Genus Arisaema (family Araceae)
- Chasmanthe aethiopica (family Iridaceae)
- Darlingtonia californica (family Sarraceniaceae)
