= Stigma (botany) =

Part of a flower

Diagram showing the stigma-style-ovary system of the female reproductive organ of a plant. The stigma is fixed to the apex of the style, a narrow upward extension of the ovary.

The stigma (pl.: stigmas or stigmata) is the receptive tip of a carpel, or of several fused carpels, in the gynoecium of a flower.

== Description ==
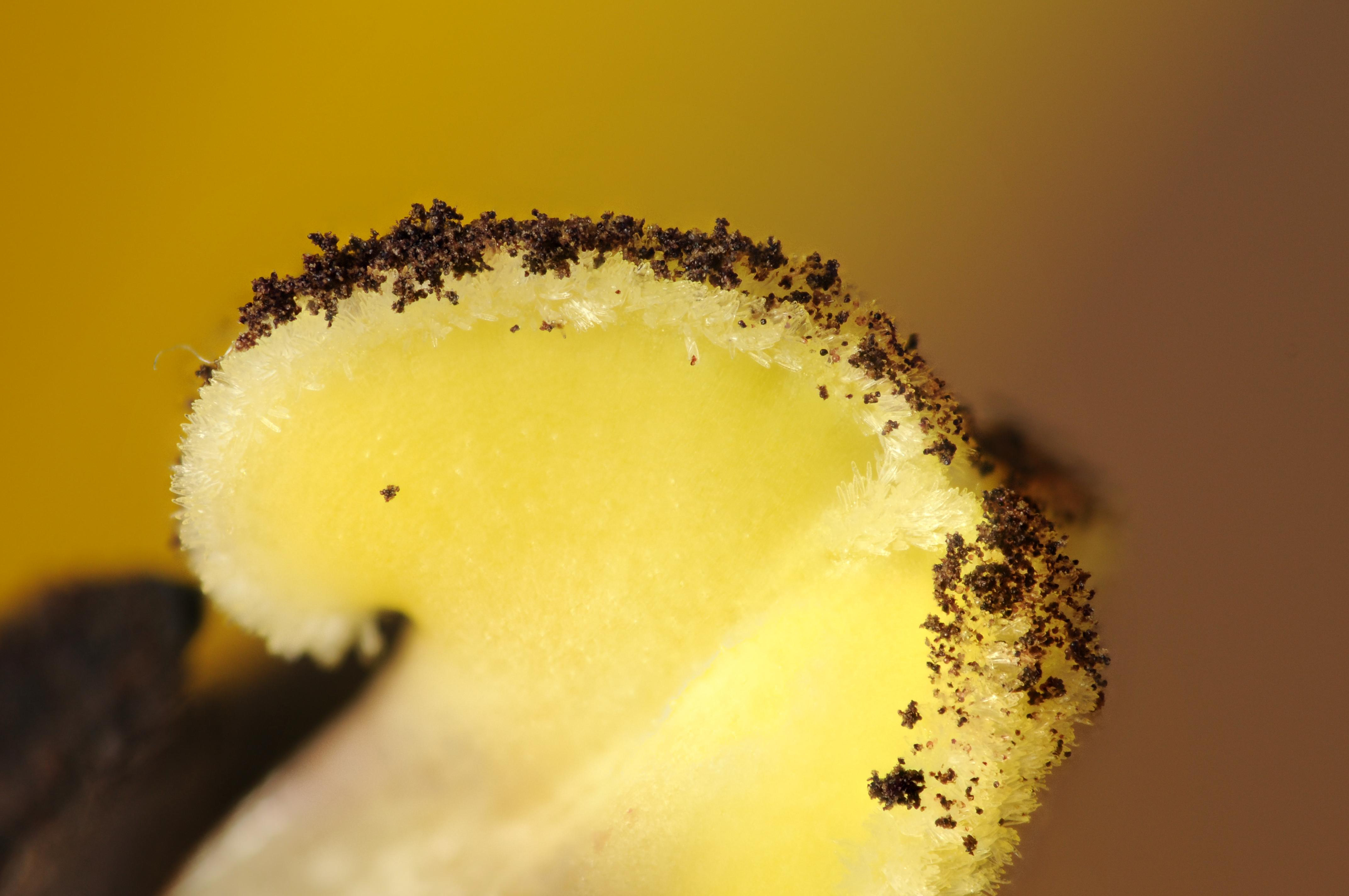
Stigma of a Tulipa species, with pollen

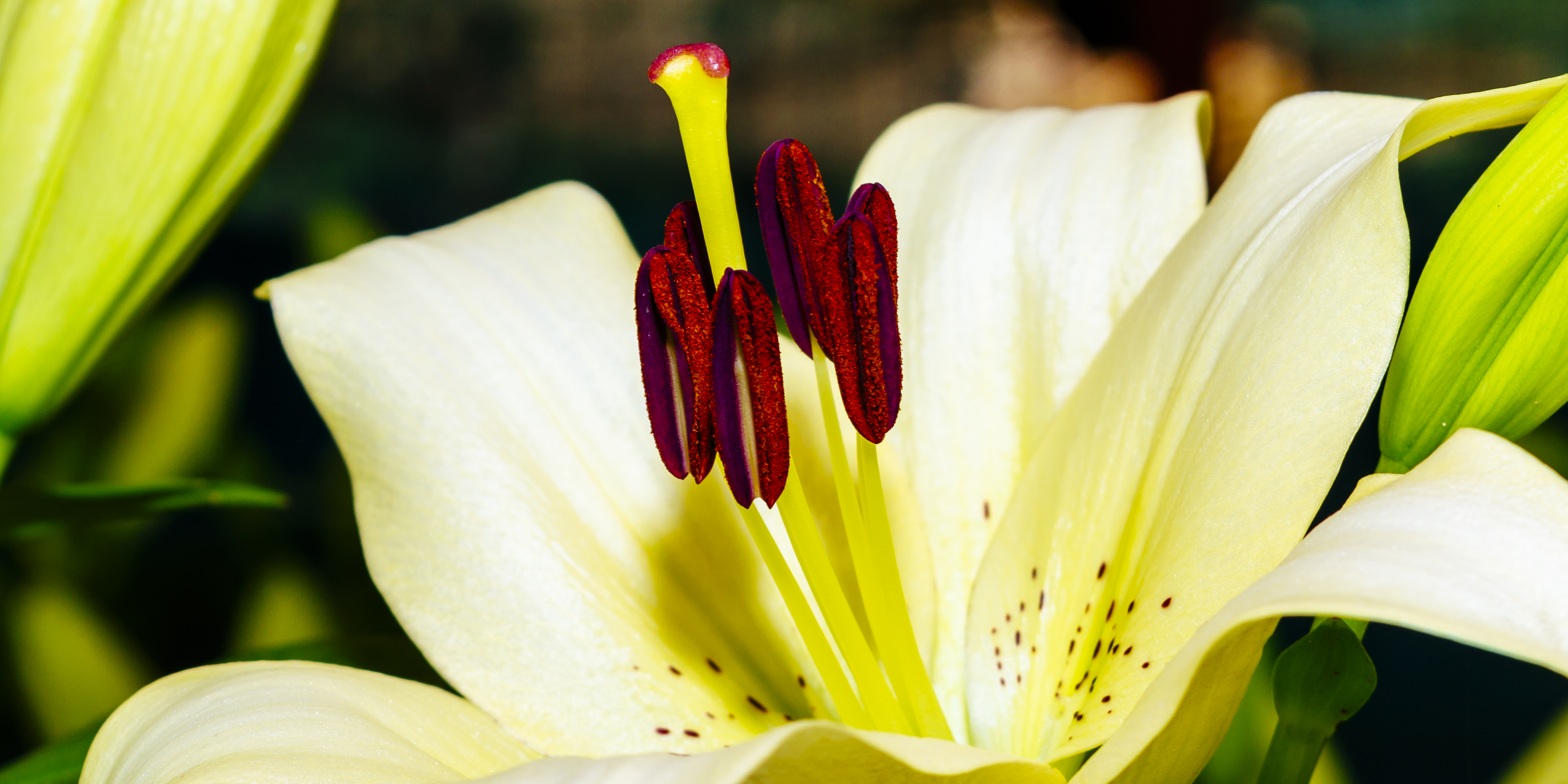
Closeup of stigma surrounded by stamens of Lilium 'Stargazer')

The stigma, along with the style and ovary (typically called the stigma-style-ovary system) constitute the pistil, which is part of the gynoecium or the receptive female reproductive organ of a plant; in animals, this organ is equivalent to the vagina, cervix, and oviduct.

The stigma itself forms the distal portion of the style, or stylodia, and is composed of stigmatic papillae, the cells of which are receptive to pollen. These may be restricted to the apex of the style or, especially in wind pollinated species, cover a wide surface.

The stigma receives pollen and it is on the stigma that the pollen grain germinates. Often sticky, the stigma is adapted in various ways to catch and trap pollen with various hairs, flaps, or sculpturings. The pollen may be captured from the air (wind-borne pollen, anemophily), from visiting insects or other animals (biotic pollination), or in rare cases from surrounding water (hydrophily). Stigma can vary from long and slender to globe shaped to feathery.

Pollen is typically highly desiccated when it leaves an anther. Stigma have been shown to assist in the rehydration of pollen and in promoting germination of the pollen tube. Stigma also ensure proper adhesion of the correct species of pollen. Stigma can play an active role in pollen discrimination and some self-incompatibility reactions, that reject pollen from the same or genetically similar plants, involve interaction between the stigma and the surface of the pollen grain.

== Shape ==
The stigma is often split into lobes, e.g. trifid (three lobed), and may resemble the head of a pin (capitate), or come to a point (punctiform). The shape of the stigma may vary considerably:

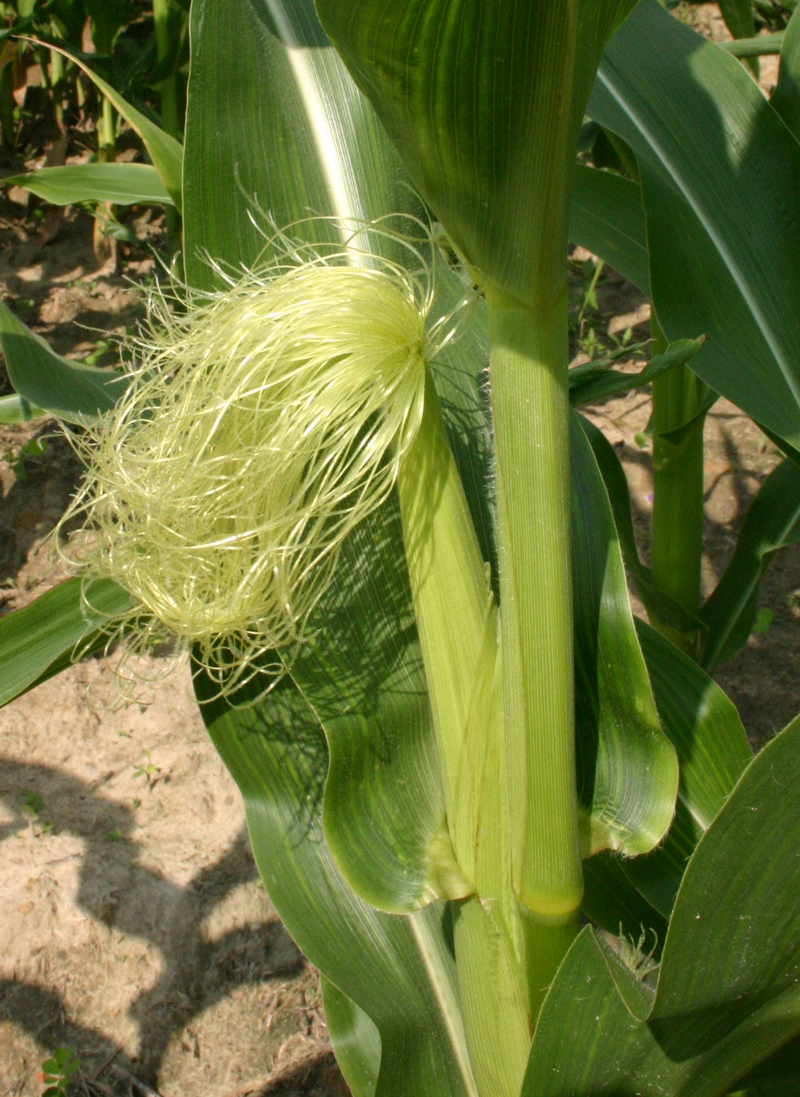
Maize stigmas, collectively called "silk"

Stigma shapes

Capitate and simple

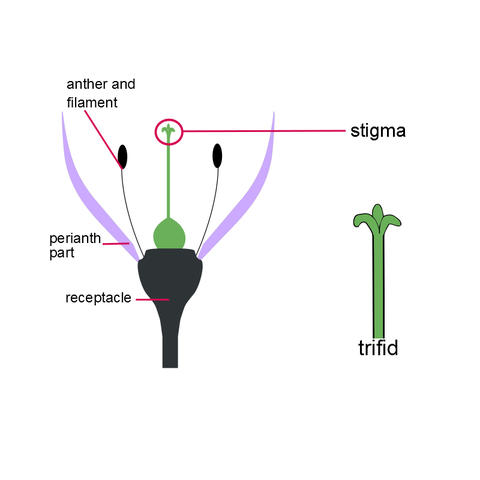
Trifid

== Style ==
The style is a narrow upward extension of the ovary, connecting it to the stigmatic papillae. Occasionally, it may be absent, in which case the stigma is described as sessile. Styles are generally tube-like—either long or short. The style can be open (containing few or no cells in the central portion) with a central canal which may be filled with mucilage. Alternatively the style may be closed (densely packed with cells throughout). Most syncarpous monocots and some eudicots have open styles, while many syncarpous eudicots and grasses have closed (solid) styles containing specialised secretory transmitting tissue, linking the stigma to the centre of the ovary. This forms a nutrient rich tract for pollen tube growth.

Where there are more than one carpel to the pistil, each may have a separate style-like stylodium, or share a common style. In irises and others in the family Iridaceae, the style divides into three petal-like (petaloid) style branches (sometimes also referred to as 'stylodia'), almost to the base of the style and is called a tribrachiate. These are flaps of tissue, running from the perianth tube above the sepal. The stigma is a rim or edge on the underside of the branch, near the end lobes. Style branches also appear on Dietes, Pardanthopsis and most species of Moraea.

In Crocus, there are three divided style branches, creating a tube. Hesperantha has a spreading style branch. Alternatively, the style may be lobed rather than branched. Gladiolus has a bi-lobed style branch (bilobate). Freesia, Lapeirousia, Romulea, Savannosiphon and Watsonia have bifurcated (two branched) and recurved style branches.

Style morphology

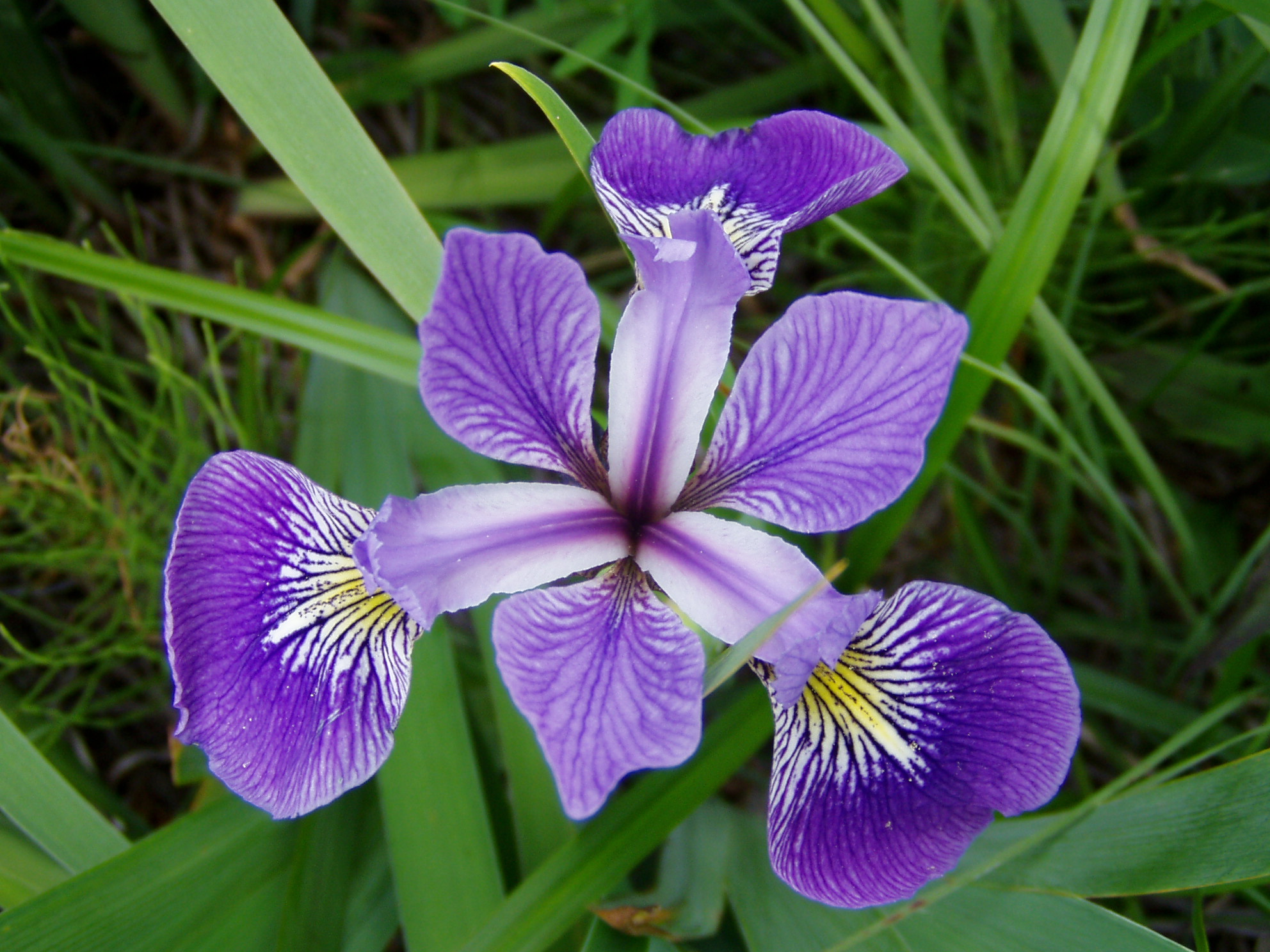
Iris versicolor showing three structures with two overlapping lips, an upper petaloid style branch and a lower tepal, enclosing a stamen

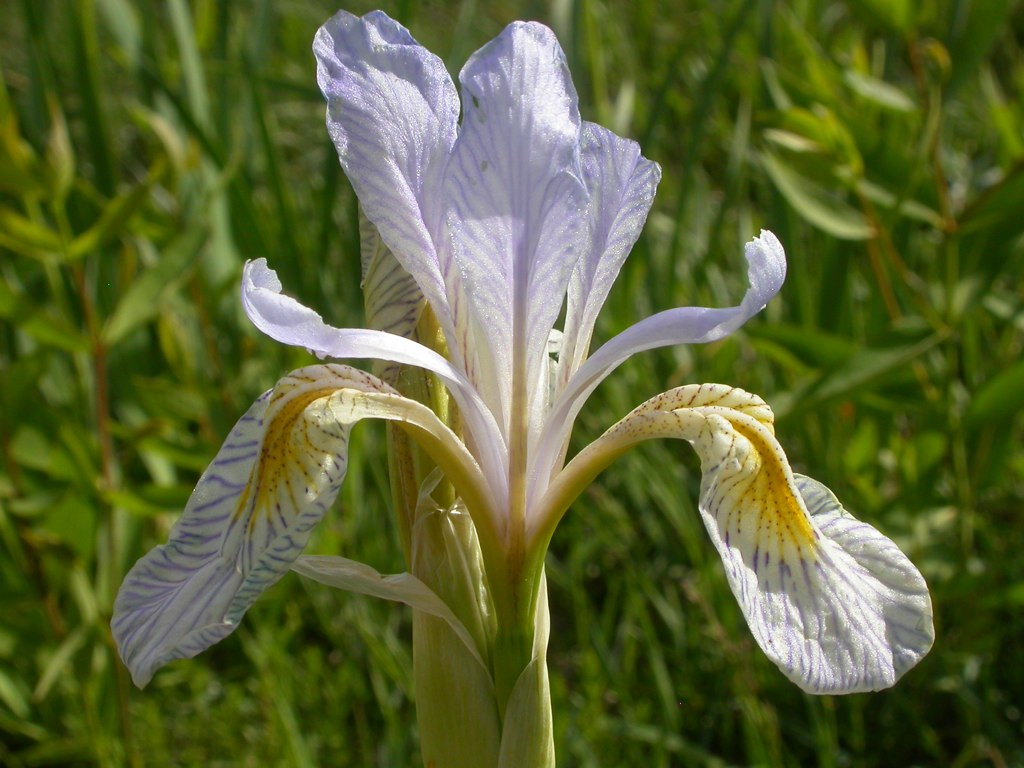
Iris missouriensis showing the pale blue style branch above the drooping petal

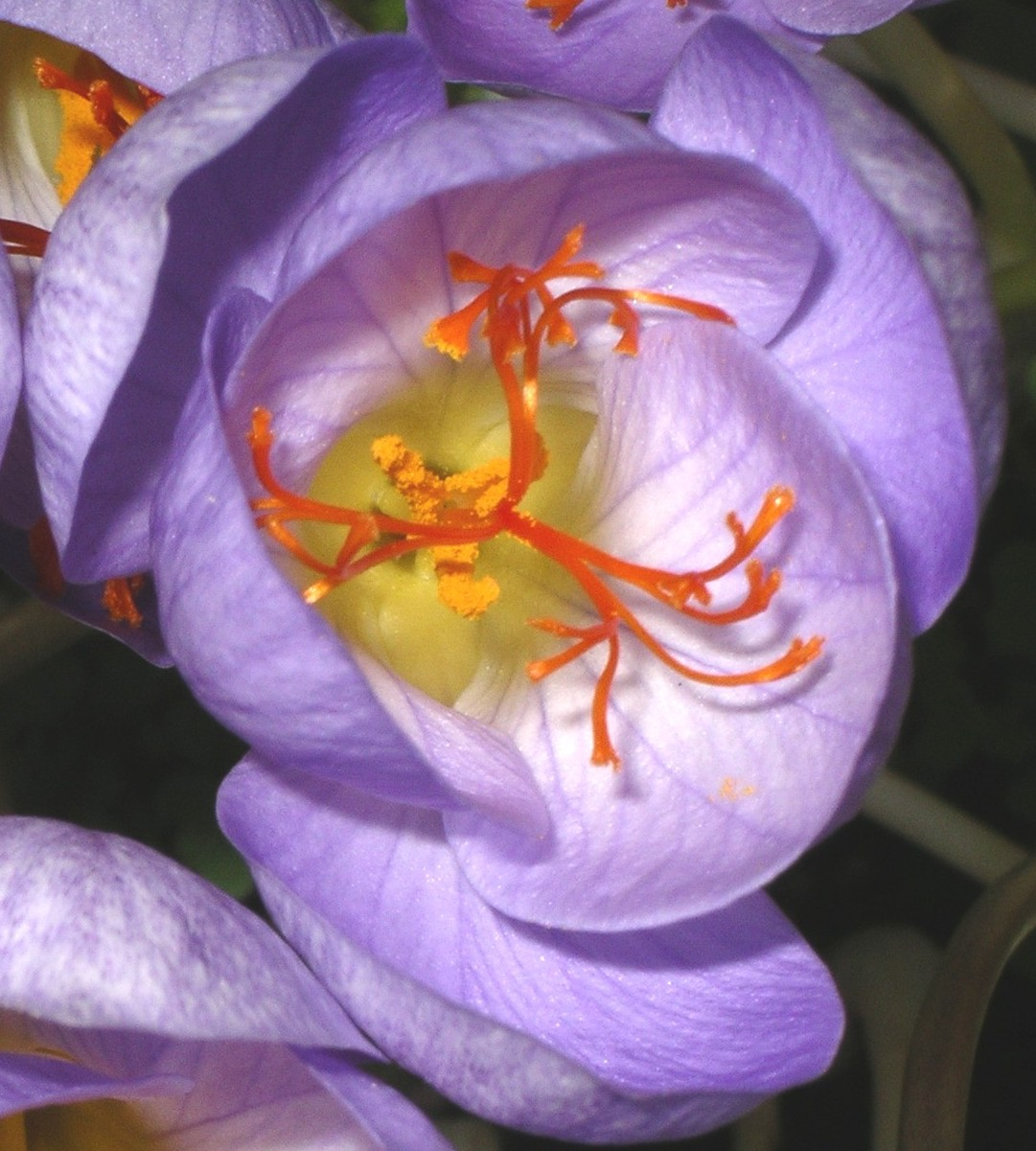
The feathery stigma of Crocus speciosus has branches corresponding to three carpels

== See also ==
- Gynoecium
- Spadix (botany)
