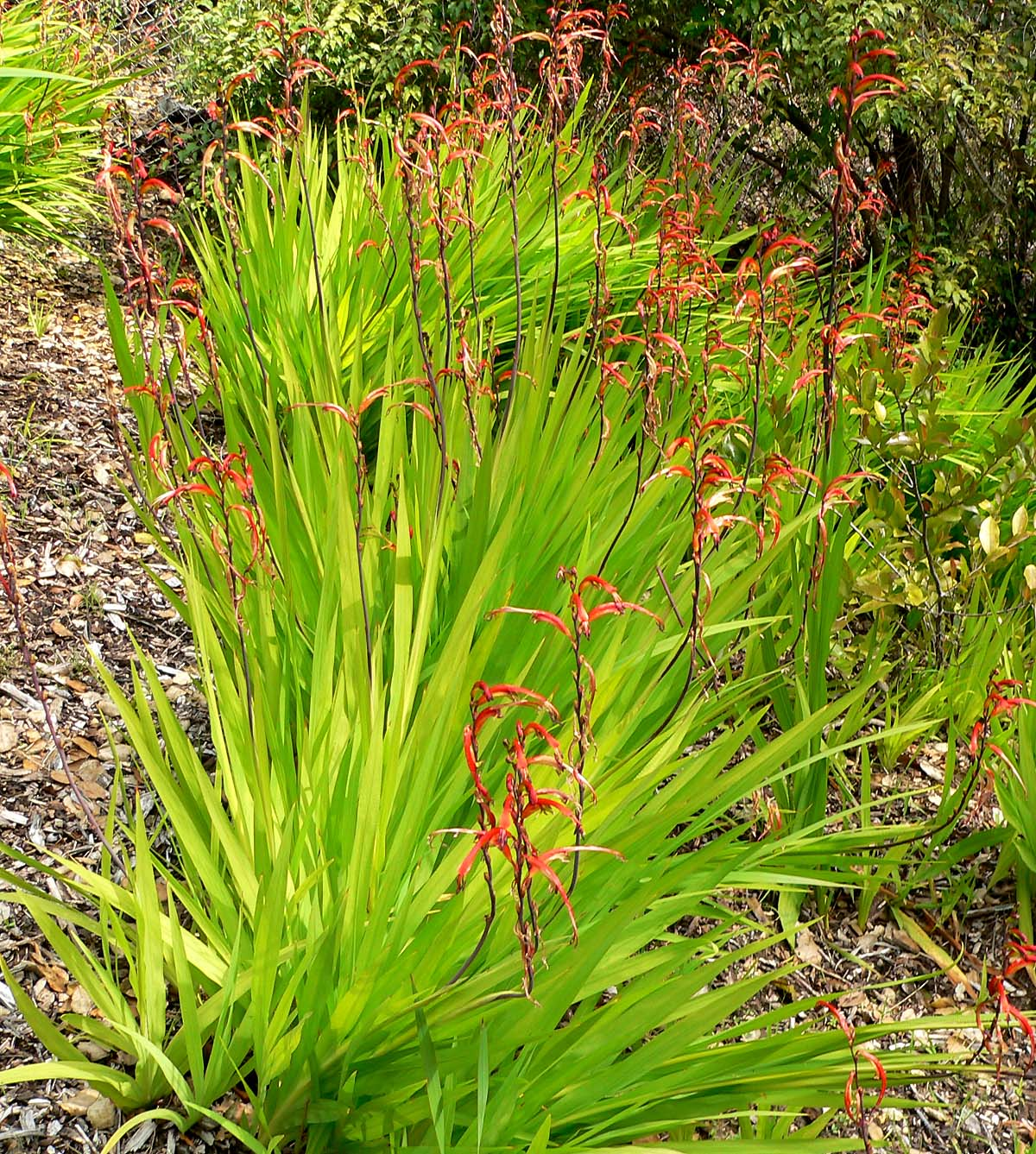

Scientific classification
- Kingdom: Plantae
- Clade: Tracheophytes
- Clade: Angiosperms
- Clade: Monocots
- Order: Asparagales
- Family: Iridaceae
- Genus: Chasmanthe
- Species: C. floribunda

Binomial name
- Chasmanthe floribunda (Salisb.) N. E. Br.

Synonyms
- Antholyza floribunda Salisb.; Petamenes floribunda (Salisb.) E.Phillips; Antholyza praealta Redouté

= Chasmanthe floribunda =

Species of flowering plant

Chasmanthe floribunda is a species of flowering plant in the iris family which is known by the common name African flag.

== Description ==
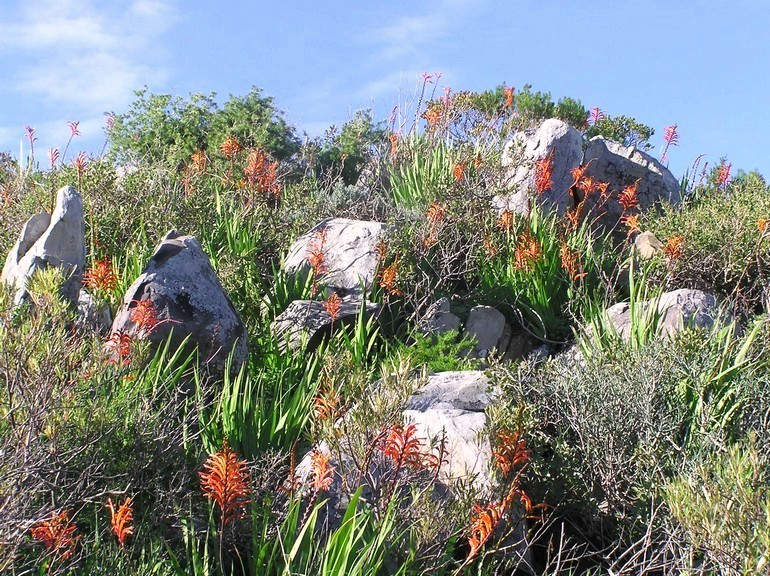
Chasmanthe floribunda in habitat near Cape Town, South Africa

Chasmanthe floribunda is a perennial herbaceous plant sprouting from a corm and producing clumps of long, narrow leaves up to 1.2 m in height. It erects one thin, tall stem which may approach a meter in height. It is a deciduous geophyte that grows 50 to 120 cm tall and forms tubers that are 6 -7 cm in diameter. It vegetates in winter, flowers in spring and remains dormant during the summer.

=== Inflorescences ===
Atop the stem is a spike inflorescence holding 20 to 40 flowers in neat vertical rows. The flower is a curving tube with a long upper lobe curving down over smaller lobes. From the mouth of the flower protrude the stamens with their large, hanging anthers, and the style. The flower is generally bright orange-red or scarlet on the upper lobe and yellow to orange in the lower lobes.

== Cultivation ==
For its cultivation it needs very well-drained soil and a place in full sun. It propagates easily by growing bulblets around the original corm, and also multiplies by seeds. Chasmanthe emerges from the ground in autumn in the Western Cape, South Africa, after the first winter rains. It is frequented by sunbirds, which feed on the nectar it provides at this time of year. It flourishes and flowers in both sun and shade.

== Distribution ==
This plant is endemic to Cape Province in South Africa, but it has been introduced to other areas of similar climate, and is considered to be naturalized in California, Algeria, Australia, Argentina, and St. Helena.

== Varieties ==
1. Chasmanthe floribunda var. duckittii G.J.Lewis ex L.Bolus
2. Chasmanthe floribunda var. floribunda – Yellow cobra lily
