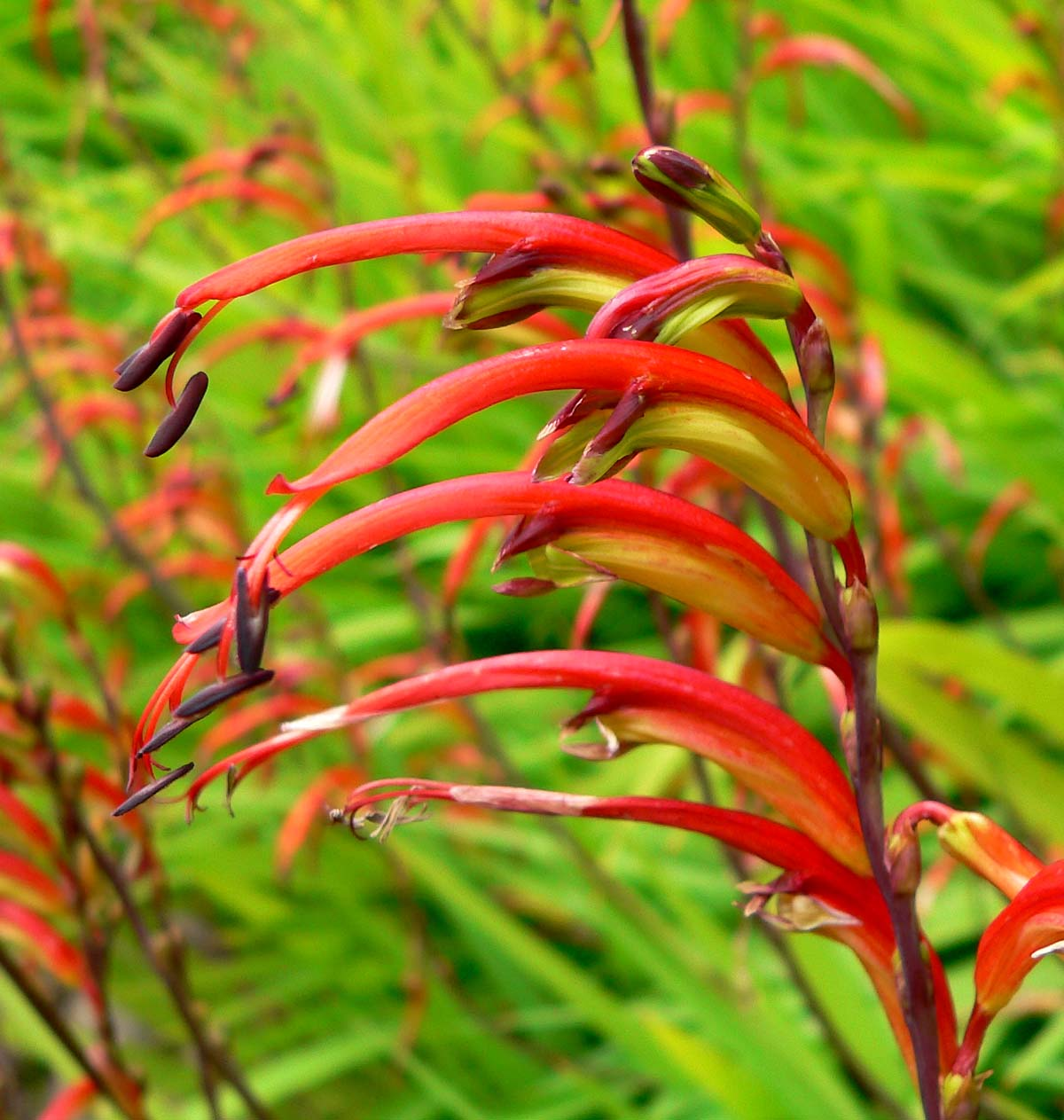
- Chasmanthe floribunda

Scientific classification
- Kingdom: Plantae
- Clade: Tracheophytes
- Clade: Angiosperms
- Clade: Monocots
- Order: Asparagales
- Family: Iridaceae
- Subfamily: Crocoideae
- Tribe: Croceae
- Genus: Chasmanthe; N.E.Br.

Type species
- Chasmanthe aethiopica (L.) N.E. Brown

= Chasmanthe =

Genus of flowering plants

Chasmanthe is a genus of flowering plants in the family Iridaceae, first described in 1932. It is endemic to Cape Province in South Africa. It is widely grown as an ornamental plant and is naturalized in various locations.

In their native habitat the flowers are pollinated by sunbirds. The genus name is derived from the Greek words chasme, meaning "gaping", and anthos, meaning "flower".

Species

Image	Name	Distribution
	Chasmanthe aethiopica (L.) N.E.Br. (Chasmanthe, Cobra Lily)	Cape Province; naturalized in the Canary Islands, Madeira, continental Portugal, continental Spain, Balearics and the Greek islands.
	Chasmanthe bicolor (Gasp. ex Ten.) N.E.Br.	Cape Province; naturalized in California, Italy and Great Britain
	Chasmanthe floribunda (Salisb.) N.E.Br. (South African Cornflag, Pennants)	Cape Province; naturalized in California, Algeria, Australia, Argentina, St. Helena
