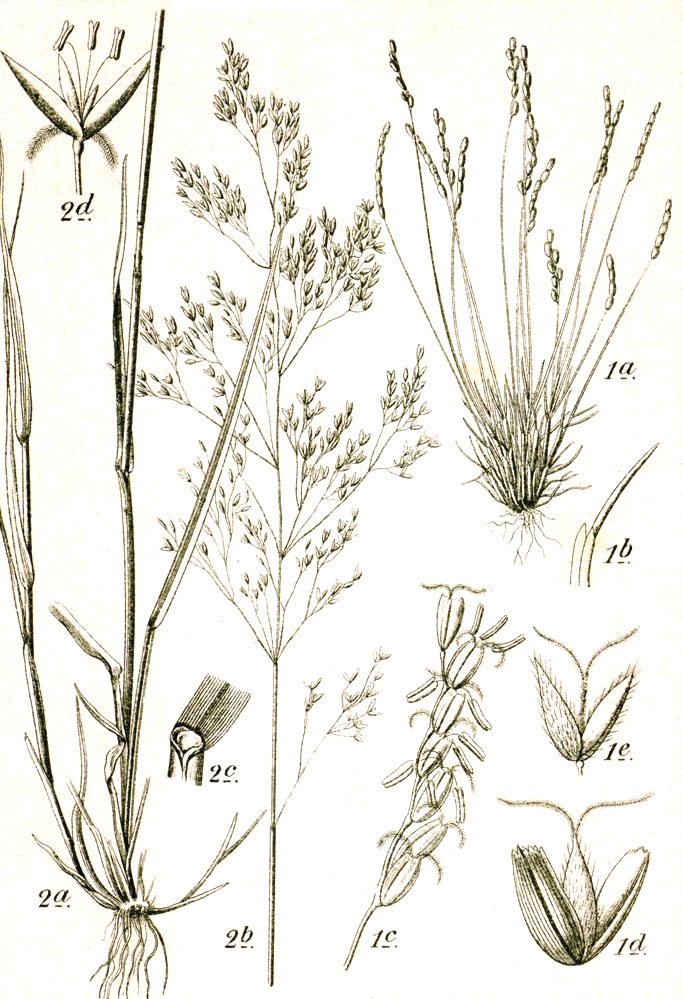
- Mibora minima (figure #1 a-d at right)

Scientific classification
- Kingdom: Plantae
- Clade: Tracheophytes
- Clade: Angiosperms
- Clade: Monocots
- Clade: Commelinids
- Order: Poales
- Family: Poaceae
- Subfamily: Pooideae
- Subtribe: Sesleriinae
- Genus: Mibora; Adans.

Species
- Mibora minima (L.)Desv. type species synonyms see List; Agrostis minima; Chamagrostis desvauxii; C. littorea; C. minima; C. minima var. elongata; C. verna; Knappia agrostidea; K. verna; K. vernalis; M. desvauxii; M. minima var. elongata; M. verna; M. verna var. elongata; Poa minima; Sturmia minima; S. verna; Mibora maroccana (Maire) Maire

Synonyms
- Chamagrostis Borkh.; Knappia Sm.; Rothia Borkh. 1792, illegitimate homonym not Schreb. 1791 nor Lam. 1792 nor Pers. 1807; Sturmia Hoppe

= Mibora =

Genus of grasses

Mibora, or sandgrass, is a genus of European and North African plants in the grass family.

== Description ==
Mibora is a genus of very small to small annual grasses with erect or sometimes quickly ascending stems (often called culms) between 2 and 13 cm (0.79 and 5.12 in) long, growing in tufts. As in all grasses the leaves consist at its base of a sheath closely enveloping the culm, a free standing blade at its tip and a ligule at the inside/upside where sheath and blade meet. The sheaths are tender, shallowly grooved rounded at their back, 0.2–1 mm (0.0079–0.0394 in) long. The ligule is membranaceus and lacks fine hairs (or cilia). The blade is flat, folded along the midline or enrolled and 1–6 cm (0.39–2.36 in) long which are up to 0.5 to 0.7 mm (0.020 to 0.028 in) wide and have a stump tip. The spikelets consist of one fertile floret, which has 3 anthers.

== Key to the species ==
1	Inflorescence embraced at base by a subtending leaf. Leaf blades folded along the midline or enrolled. Glumes similar in texture to the fertile lemma. Lemma ovate. Morocco. → Mibora maroccana
-	Inflorescence without a leaf at its base. Leaf blades flat or enrolled. Glumes more firm than the fertile lemma. Lemma obtuse. Spain, Portugal, France, Belgium, The Netherlands, middle and southern England, Wales, and very rare in the eastern Mediterranean. Introduced in the eastern USA and Canada, but does not maintain itself. → Mibora minima
