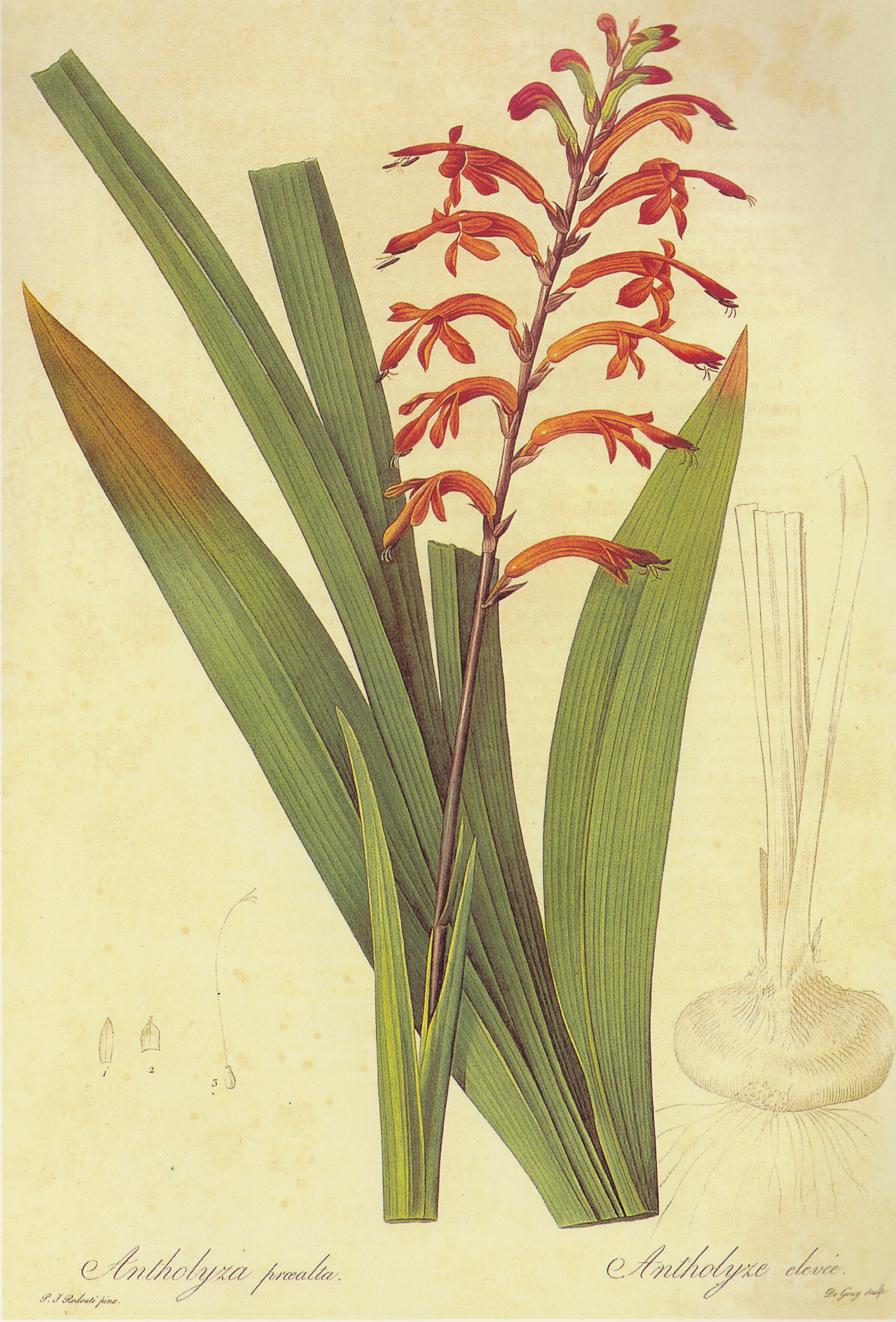

Scientific classification
- Kingdom: Plantae
- Clade: Tracheophytes
- Clade: Angiosperms
- Clade: Monocots
- Order: Asparagales
- Family: Iridaceae
- Genus: Chasmanthe
- Species: C. aethiopica

Binomial name
- Chasmanthe aethiopica (L.) N.E.Br., (1932)

Synonyms
- Antholyza aethiopica L.; Antholyza immarginata (Baker) Thunb. ex N.E.Br.; Antholyza ringens Andrews; Antholyza vittigera Salisb.; Chasmanthe peglerae N.E.Br.; Chasmanthe vittigera (Salisb.) N.E.Br.; Gladiolus aethiopicus (L.) Drapiez; Gladiolus stolonifer Salisb.; Petamenes aethiopica (L.) Allan; Petamenes peglerae (N.E.Br.) E.Phillips; Petamenes vittigera (Salisb.) E.Phillips

= Chasmanthe aethiopica =

Species of flowering plant

Chasmanthe aethiopica, the cobra lily, is a perennial plant and geophyte belonging to the genus Chasmanthe and is part of the fynbos. The plant is endemic to the Eastern and Western Cape. The plant grows to a height of 40 to 65 cm and flowers from April to July. The flowers are red-purple.
