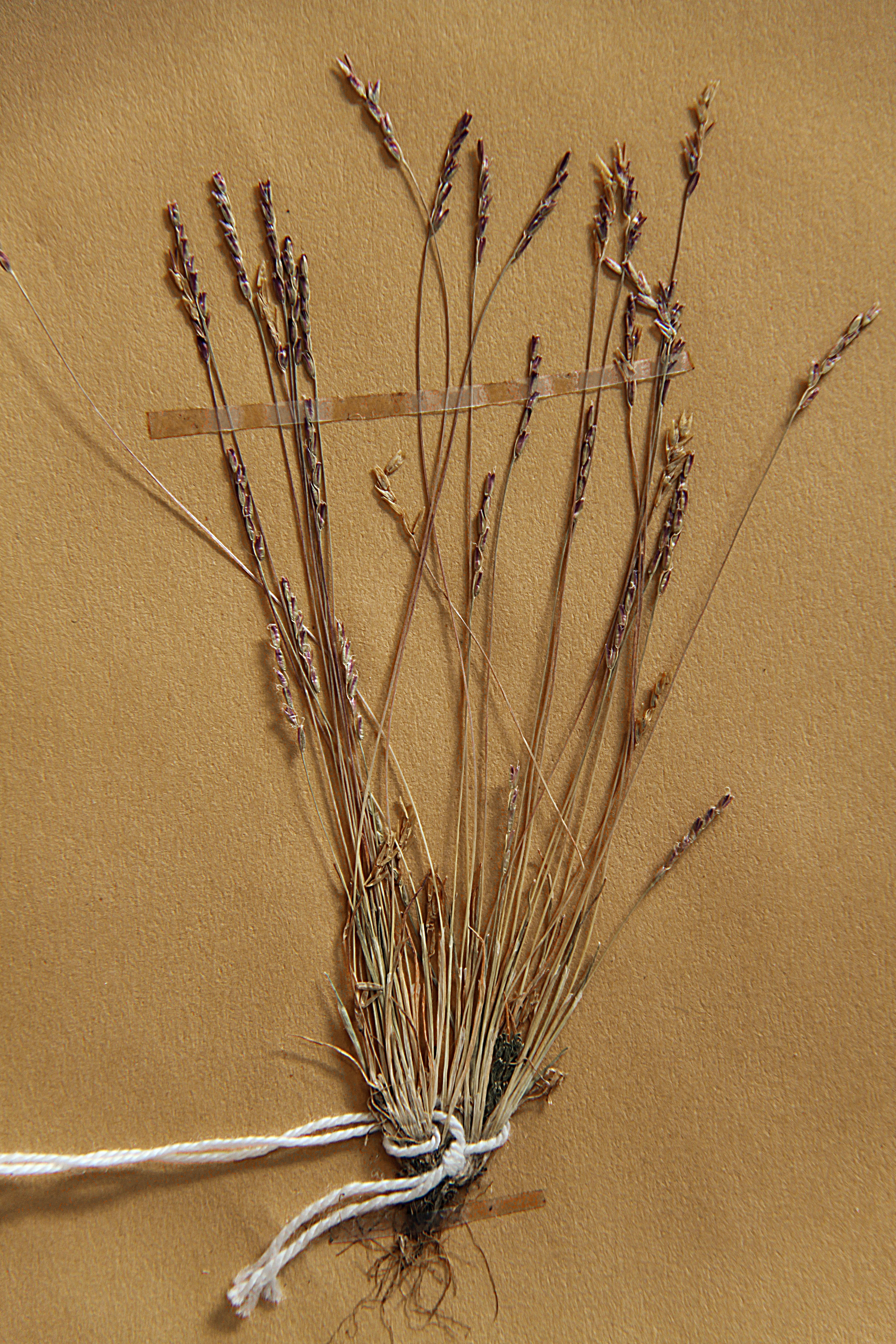
- Dried Mibora minima specimen, 9 cm high

Scientific classification
- Kingdom: Plantae
- Clade: Tracheophytes
- Clade: Angiosperms
- Clade: Monocots
- Clade: Commelinids
- Order: Poales
- Family: Poaceae
- Subfamily: Pooideae
- Genus: Mibora
- Species: M. minima

Binomial name
- Mibora minima (L.)Desv.

Synonyms
- List: Agrostis minima L.; Chamagrostis desvauxii (Lange) Nyman; Chamagrostis littorea Samp.; Chamagrostis minima (L.) Borkh.; Chamagrostis minima var. elongata Hack.; Chamagrostis verna (Pers.) Sloboda; Knappia agrostidea Sm.; Knappia verna (Pers.) Trin.; Knappia vernalis Trin.; Mibora desvauxii Lange; Mibora minima var. elongata (Hack.) Husn.; Mibora verna (Pers.) P.Beauv.; Mibora verna var. elongata (Hack.) Rouy; Poa minima (L.) Stokes; Sturmia minima (L.) Hoppe; Sturmia verna Pers.

= Mibora minima =

Species of grass

Mibora minima, the early sandgrass, is a small (between 2 and 15 cm high) annual species of grass that is native in western and southwestern Europe.

It is an invasive species on both sides of the Canada–United States border from Lake Huron east to Maine.

It grows on moist sand in open vegetations.

== Description ==
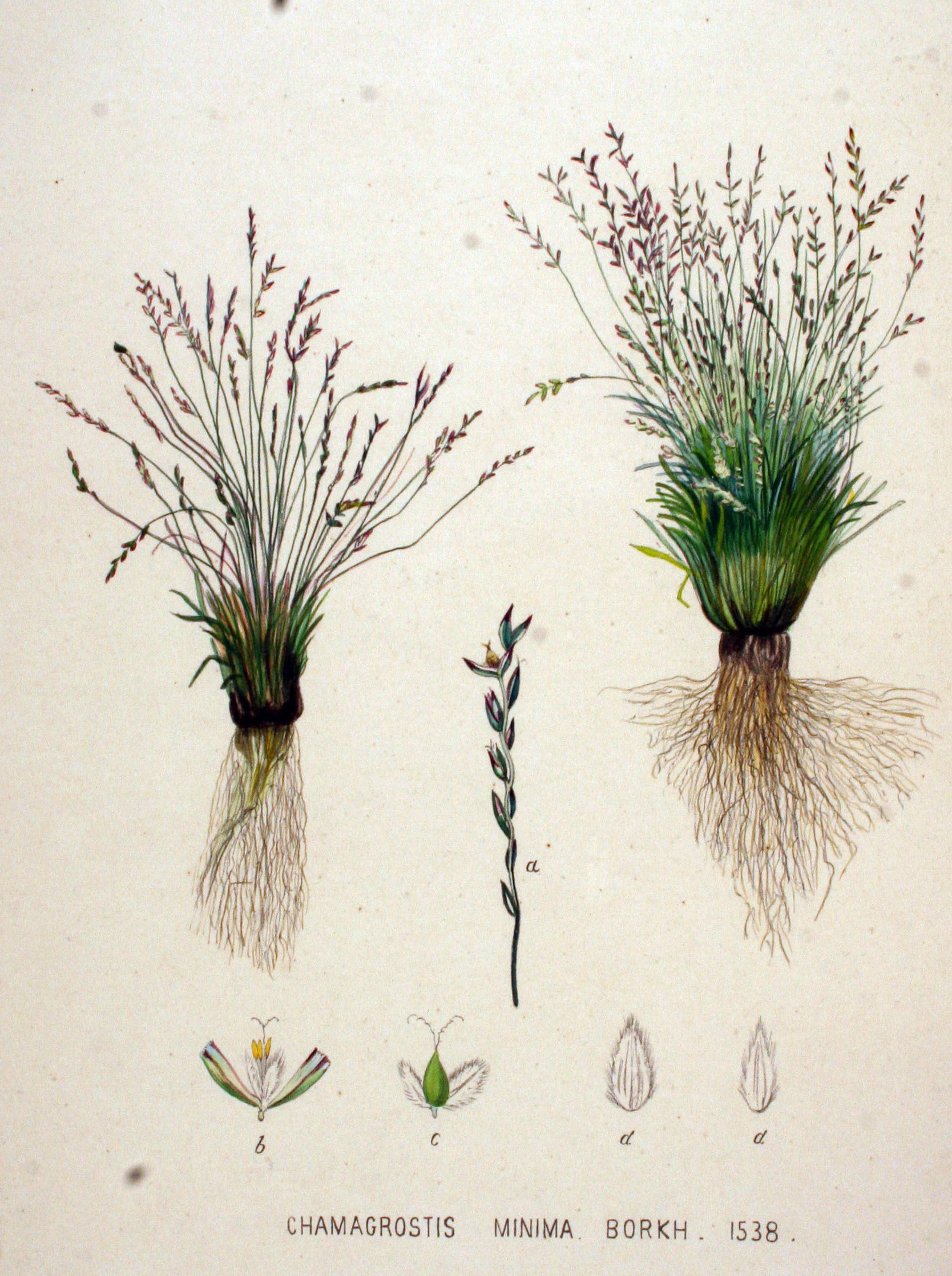
Etch from the Flora Batava

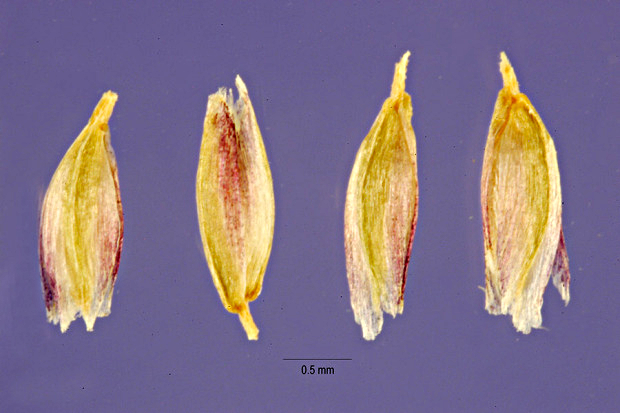
florets, 2nd from left facing up

Mibora minima is a small annual species of grass, with tufts of thin stems of about 0.3 mm wide and 10 cm long, each with 2 or 3 leaves at or very near the base, consisting of tender, shallowly grooved sheaths, rounded at their back, 0.2–1 mm long ligules, flat or enrolled blades of 1–5 cm long which are up to 0.5 mm wide and have a stump tip.
