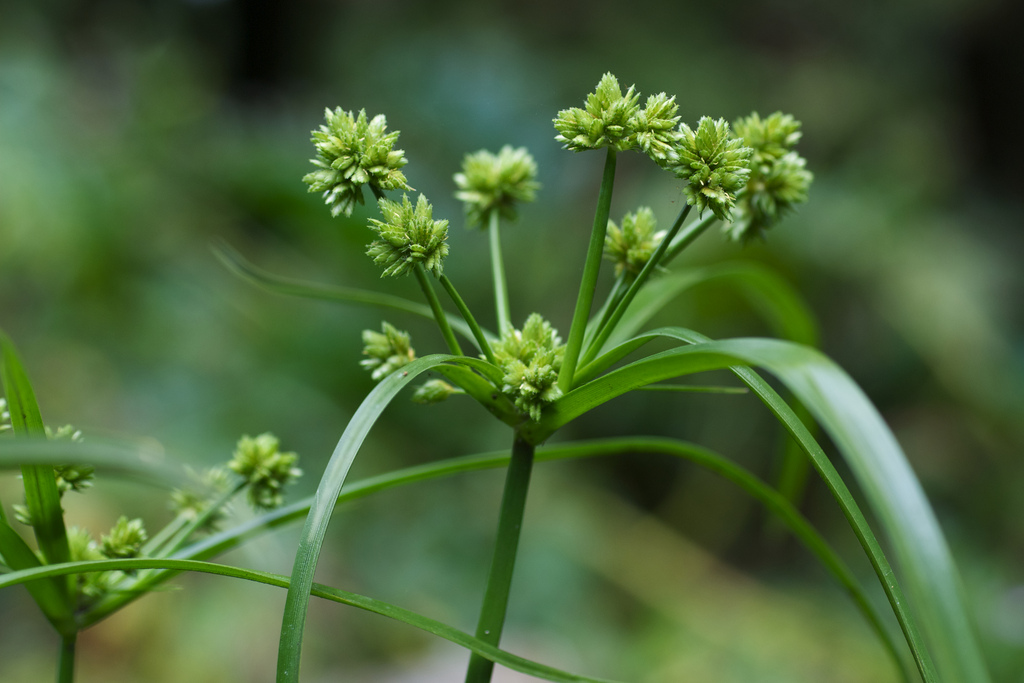

Scientific classification
- Kingdom: Plantae
- Clade: Tracheophytes
- Clade: Angiosperms
- Clade: Monocots
- Clade: Commelinids
- Order: Poales
- Family: Cyperaceae
- Genus: Cyperus
- Species: C. eragrostis

Binomial name
- Cyperus eragrostis Lam.

Synonyms
- Cyperus vegetus

= Cyperus eragrostis =

Species of plant

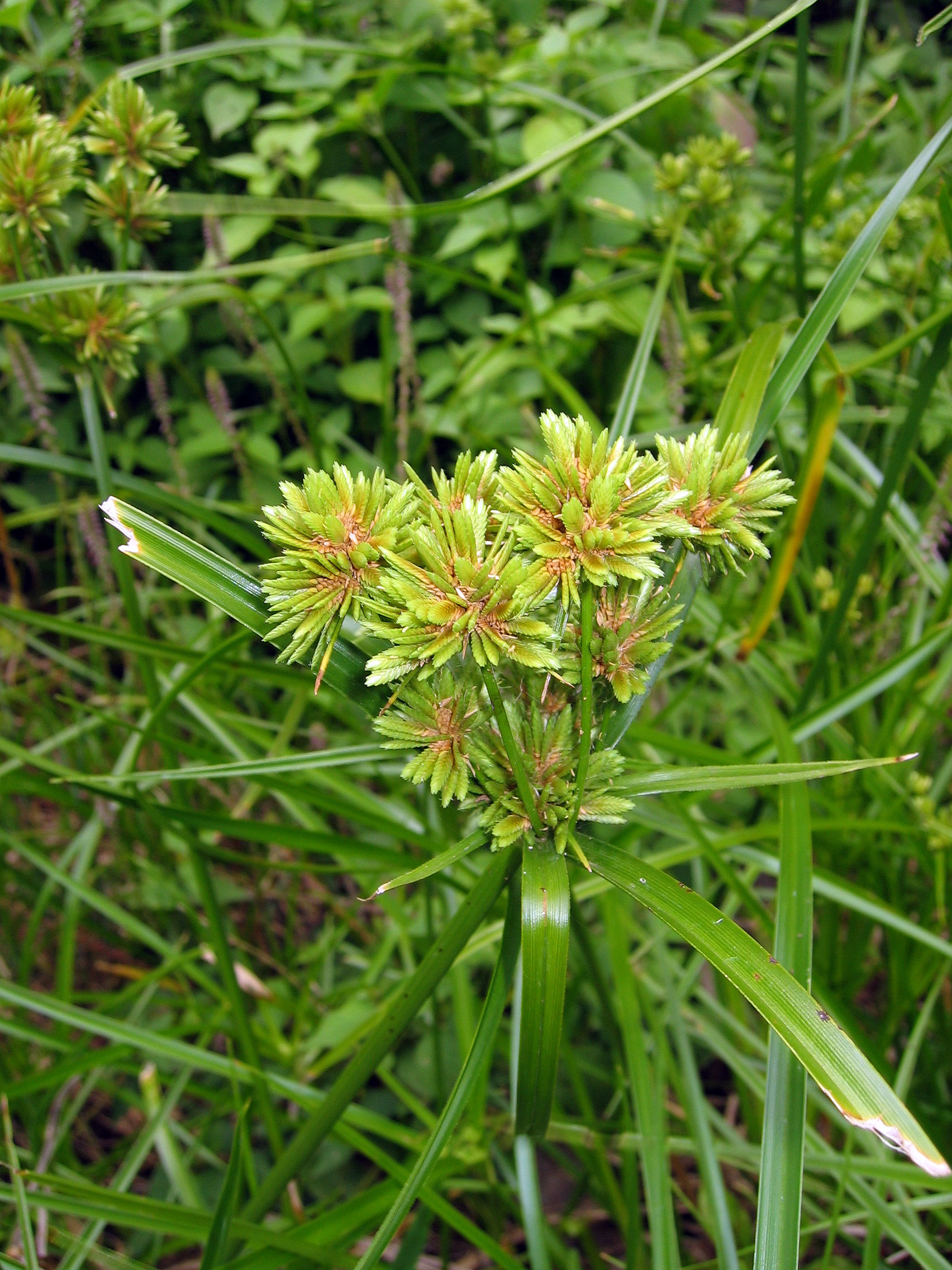
Flowers

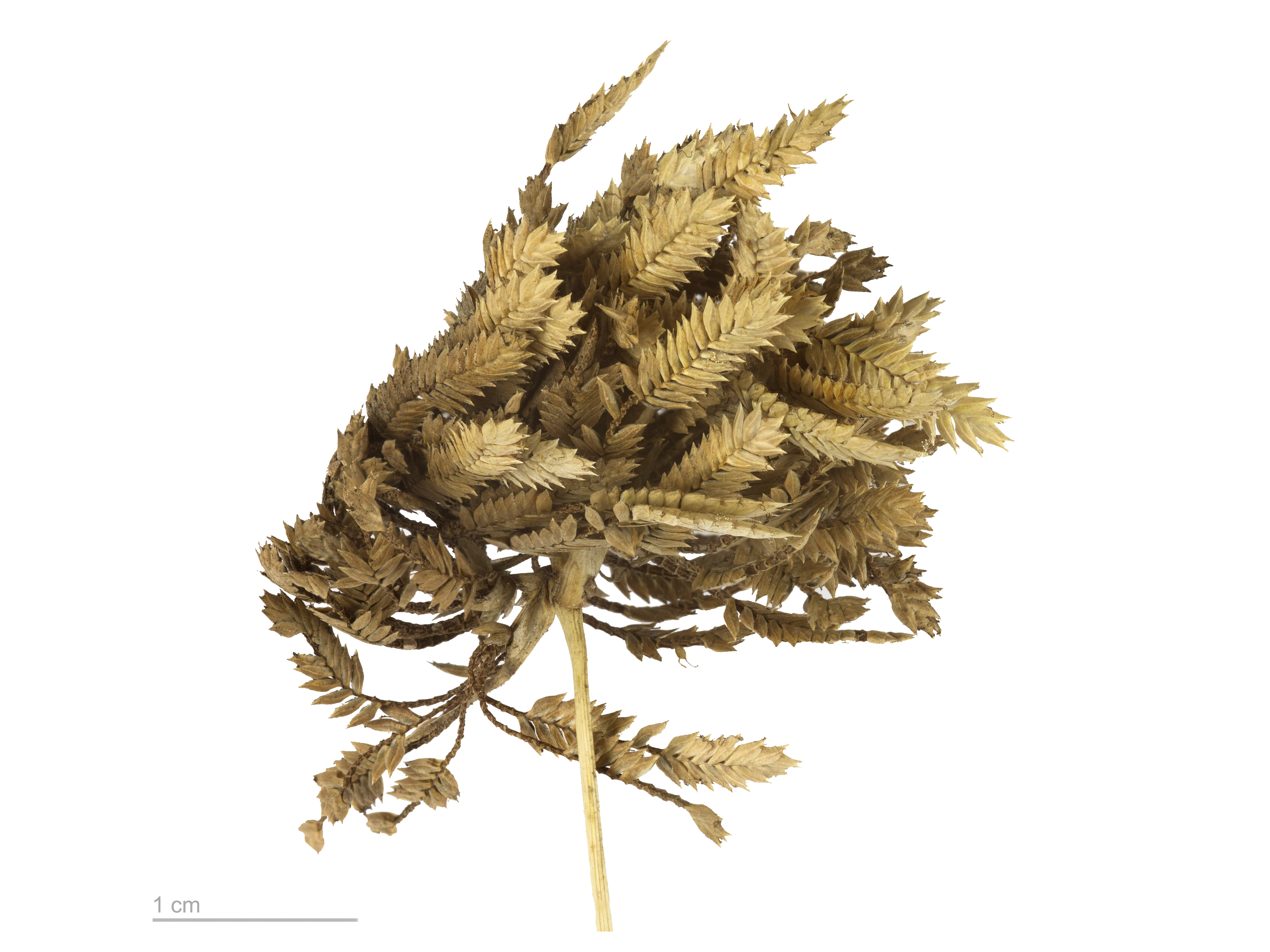
MHNT specimen of seedhead.

Cyperus eragrostis is a species of sedge known by several common names, including tall flatsedge, nutgrass, tall nutgrass, umbrella sedge, chufa, Earth almond, zula nuts, edible galingale and pale galingale. In New Zealand, it is also known by the Māori name Puketangata. This species is associated with disturbed wet environments.

== Description ==
Cyperus eragrostis is a tufted herbaceous plant in the sedge family that is commonly mistaken for a type of grass. However, it can be differentiated from grasses by many features. Firstly, the plant has a short, thick, woody rhizome. These stems are crucial for helping Cyperus eragrostis survive changes in seasons. These stems are trigonous, solid, leafy, and a bit thicker at the base, growing 25-90 cm tall.

The leaves of the plant grow from the base and are slender, flat and linear with finely serrated margins. They are usually flat but can also be slightly folded, forming a slight V-shape, often making them blend in with different species of grass. The leaf size ranges from a width of 4-8 mm and is typically bright green, while the protective sheaths of the plant are a dark purple-brown colour.

The inflorescence of Cyperus eragrostis is another one of its most defining features and is the reason for one of its common names of “umbrella sedge”. At the top of the stem, a compound umbel can be found. This compound umbel consists of up to twelve 3-10 cm rays which all have globose heads at the end of them. These globose heads (the rounded head at the end of a ray) have a diameter of 10-20 mm and are not a single flower. They are a cluster of small spikelets which 20-40 smaller flowers grow out of. These globose heads are surrounded by 5-8 much longer leaves for protection.

The spikelets on the globose head are narrow, yellow, green or brown in colour, and range from 10 to 15 mm long. They can produce up to 40 bisexual florets per spikelet which are enfolded by a glume. Each flower contains a single stamen and three stigma styles which are 1-1.2 mm long. Finally, after the process of fertilization, Cyperus eragrostis produces a fruit called an achene. This fruit is a trigonous, dry, hard-shelled fruit of a dark brown to black color ranging from 1.2 to 1.3 mm long.

With all these features combined, Cyperus eragrostis is quite a simple and easy plant to spot, especially in the flowering seasons because it stands out from grasses for which it is often mistaken.

== Range ==
=== Natural global range ===
Cyperus eragrostis is native to subtropical and tropical regions of South America, including Argentina, Bolivia, Brazil, Chile, and Peru. It has also been introduced to parts of Canada, Mexico, and parts of the United States including California, Mississippi, Louisiana, New Jersey, South Carolina, Texas, Oregon, Pennsylvania, and Washington.

Other than its native range, Cyperus eragrostis has spread to many different places around the world by being naturalized or introduced. It has been recorded as an invasive species in many European countries such as France, Switzerland, Germany, Spain, Hungary, Netherlands, Portugal, England, Italy, Montenegro, Czech Republic, Slovenia, Bulgaria, and Turkey. This species is found scattered throughout the North and South Islands of New Zealand where it is also considered an invasive pest on the New Zealand weed list.

== Habitat ==
Cyperus eragrostis occupies various habitats around the world. It thrives in wet, open, disturbed environments made up of hydric soils (saturated soils) such as wetlands, ditches, roadside ditches, riverbanks, ponds, swamps, floodplains, mud flats, shallow vegetated channels in pastures and fields, sandflats, and muddy lake edges. This species is a heliophilous plant, which means it thrives in areas of high sunlight and minimal shade. It is also sensitive to salinity (dissolved salts in water) and prefers moderate to high nutrient-rich soils with a neutral pH. Cyperus eragrostis is also able to establish itself in clay-loam and sandy-loam soils, making it easy for it to spread and reproduce. Cyperus eragrostis gets its nutrients through its roots so therefore the species prefers mesotrophic soil (soil with balanced nutrients) with a high richness of organic matter. With all these reasons combined, Cyperus eragrostis has been able to establish itself easily all around the world in both natural and modified environments.

== Ecology ==
=== Life cycle and phenology ===
Cyperus eragrostis is great at establishing itself quickly because it has two main ways of reproduction; one through the sexual reproduction of seeds and one from spreading vegetatively through its rhizomes. The vegetative growth stage starts in spring from either seed germination or resprouting from a rhizome. Given the right conditions, during the end of spring and throughout summer, flowers and a small hard achene fruit will start to be produced on the compound umbels of spikelets. In late summer, the fruiting process will begin to end, with seeds waiting to be dispersed. These fruits/seeds have a high germination rate so when it was introduced to many countries for decorative and recreational uses it spread quickly. The species has also managed to reproduce in large numbers through their rhizomes, therefore aiding its numbers in moist disturbed environments.

=== Predators, parasites and diseases ===
There is very little information about the predators, parasites, and diseases of Cyperus eragrostis. However, the seeds of the plant are important because they provide feed for many animals such as ducks, sandhill cranes, crows, and waterfowl. In some countries, even mammals such as kangaroos and rats eat the seeds. Animals and birds also disperse its seeds quickly. The plant's tubers are also eaten by ducks and geese during the winter.

== Cultural uses ==
In some regions, the small nut-like tubers of Cyperus eragrostis are eaten by people either raw or cooked. This is not a common practice because it is considered an invasive weed in most countries where it is found but, when cooked, it tastes like coconuts and raisins. The base of the stem (rhizomes) are also edible.

The leaf of Cyperus eragrostis was used by Native Americans to weave baskets and other objects.

One possible reason for introducing this species is that it is good at controlling erosion. The rhizome of the plant enables it to form dense clumps in soil that helps to stabilize and restore degraded areas. However, once Cyperus eragrostis is introduced, it has a habit of overtaking and out-competing other species.

== See also ==
- List of Cyperus species
