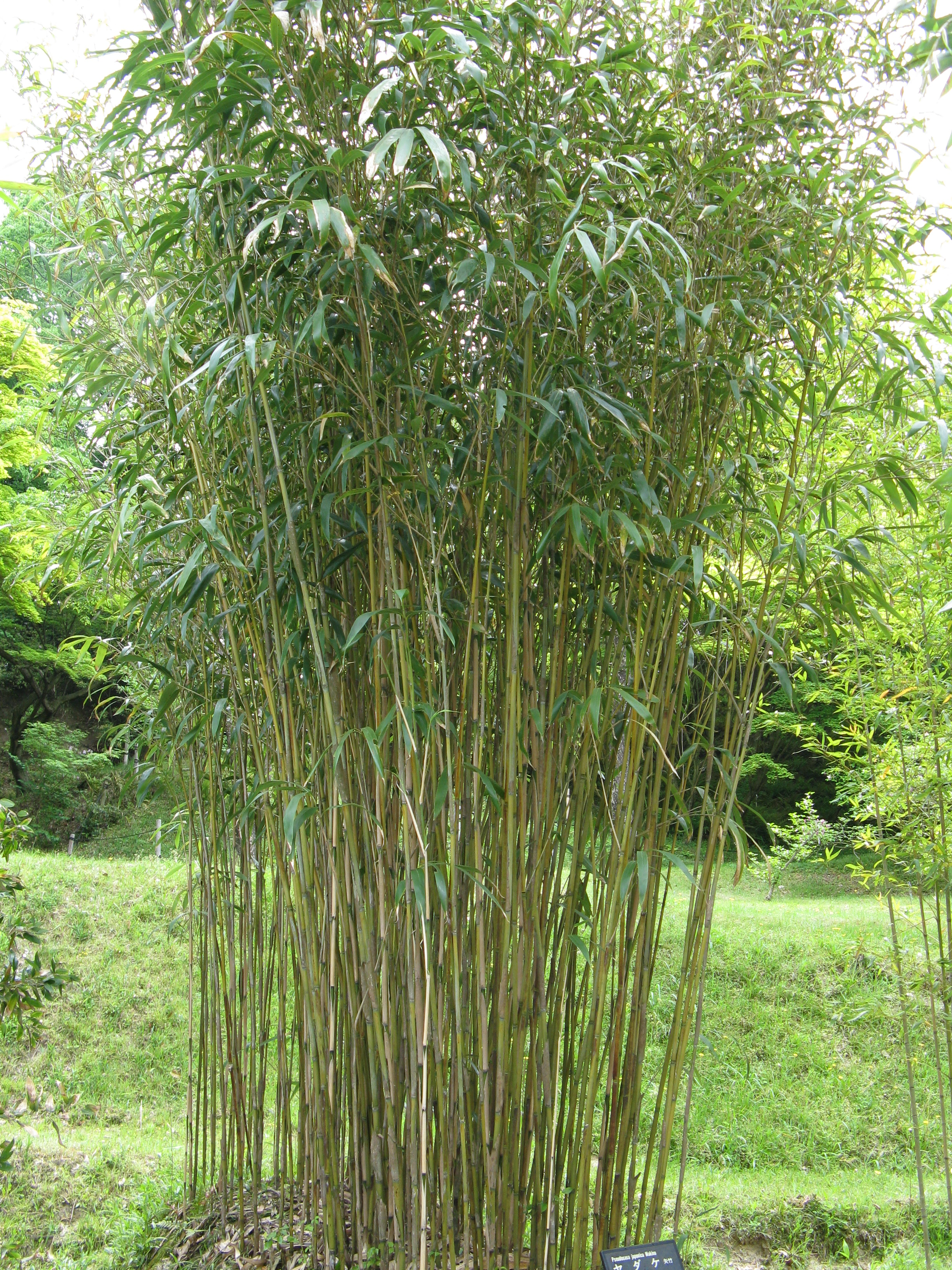

Scientific classification
- Kingdom: Plantae
- Clade: Tracheophytes
- Clade: Angiosperms
- Clade: Monocots
- Clade: Commelinids
- Order: Poales
- Family: Poaceae
- Genus: Pseudosasa
- Species: P. japonica

Binomial name
- Pseudosasa japonica (Siebold & Zucc. ex Steud.) Makino ex Nakai

Synonyms
- Arundinaria japonica Siebold & Zucc. ex Steud.; Sasa japonica (Siebold & Zucc. ex Steud.) Makino; Yadakeya japonica (Siebold & Zucc. ex Steud.) Makino; Arundinaria japonica Siebold & Zucc. ex Steud.

= Pseudosasa japonica =

Species of grass

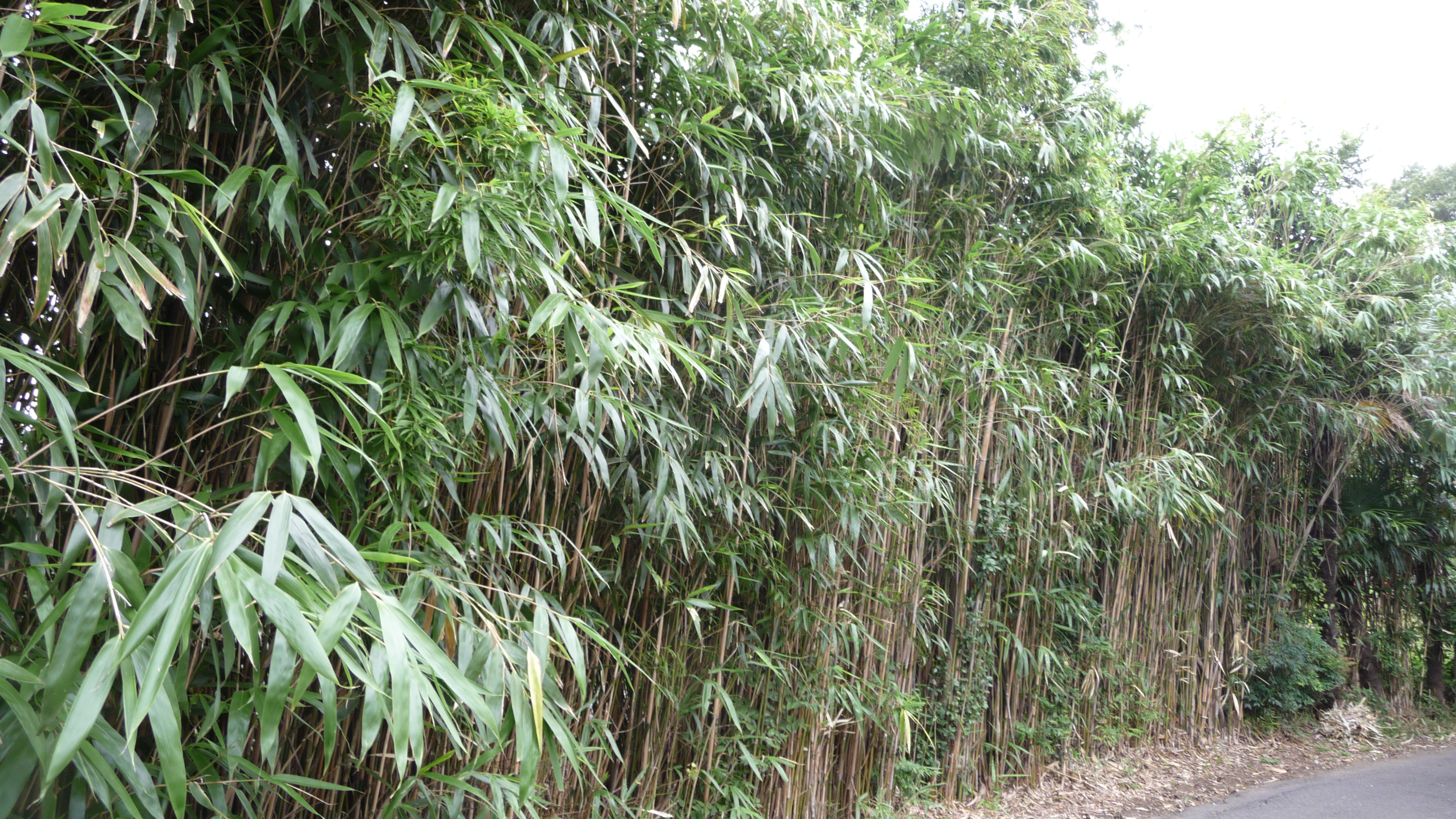
Pseudosasa japonica (diameter 15 to 25 mm by eye measurement, Ichikawa, Chiba Prefecture Japan)

Pseudosasa japonica, the arrow bamboo (Japanese: ヤダケ, 矢竹, yadake), is a species of bamboo in the grass family Poaceae. Native to Japan and Korea, it is planted worldwide as a horticultural plant.

== Etymology ==
The English common name "arrow bamboo" is a calque of Japanese ヤダケ (矢竹, yadake) of the same meaning, said to come from samurai using its hard and stiff canes for their arrows.

== Description ==
This vigorous bamboo forms thickets up to 6 m (20 ft) tall with shiny leaves up to 25 cm (9.8 in) long. Its culms are typically yellow-brown, and it has palm-like leaves. It grows up to 4 cm (1.6 in) a day.

== Cultivation ==
This cold hardy bamboo species (tolerant to 0 °F (−18 °C)) grows well both in shade and full sun. Pseudosasa japonica does very well in containers and salty air near the ocean. Because it tends to be more shade tolerant than other bamboo species it is often used by gardeners as an understory to a tree-lined living fence. In cultivation in the UK this species has gained the Royal Horticultural Society's Award of Garden Merit.
