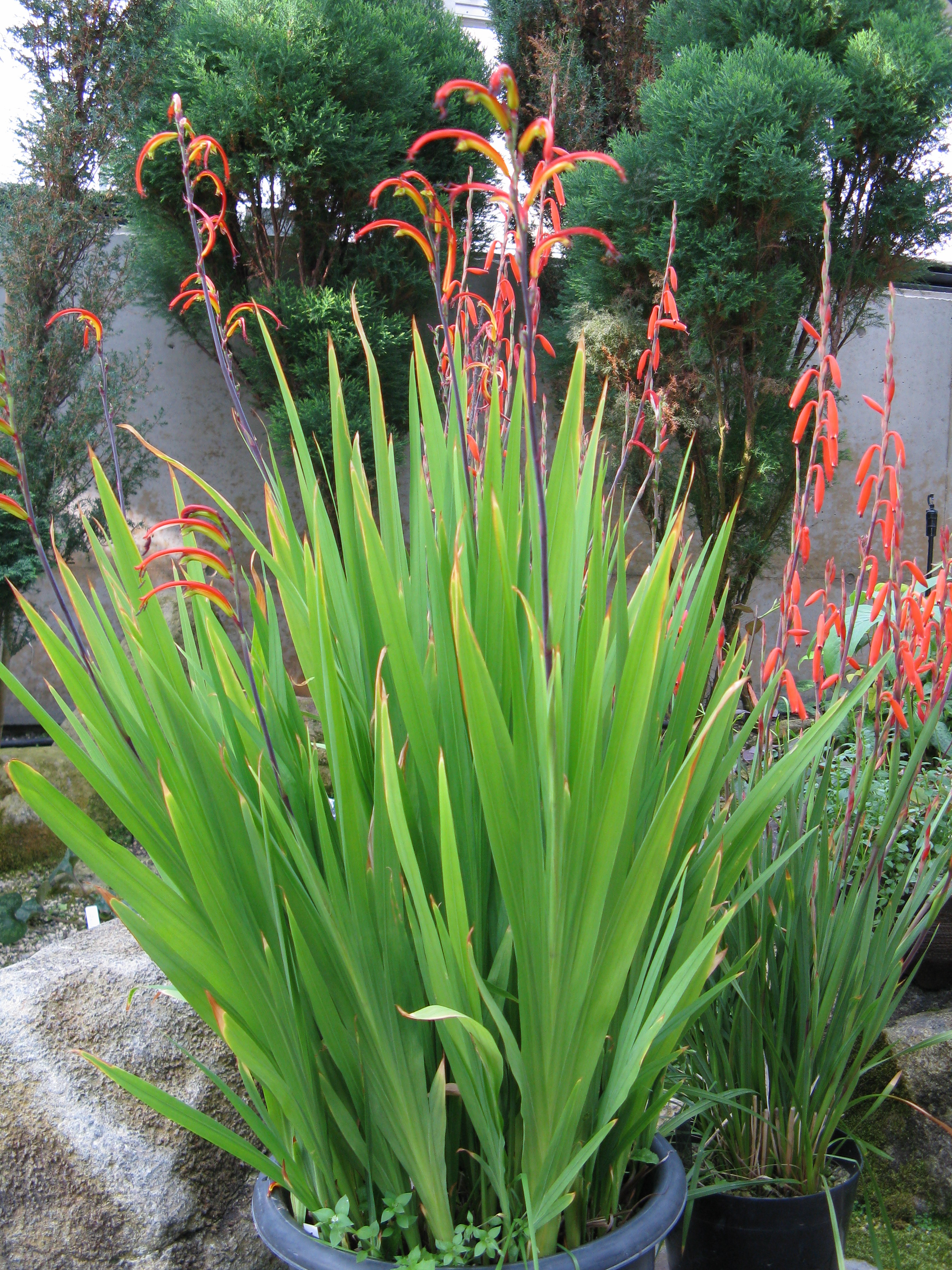

Scientific classification
- Kingdom: Plantae
- Clade: Tracheophytes
- Clade: Angiosperms
- Clade: Monocots
- Order: Asparagales
- Family: Iridaceae
- Genus: Chasmanthe
- Species: C. bicolor

Binomial name
- Chasmanthe bicolor (Gasp.) N.E.Br.

= Chasmanthe bicolor =

Species of flowering plant

Chasmanthe bicolor is a plant species in the family Iridaceae.
