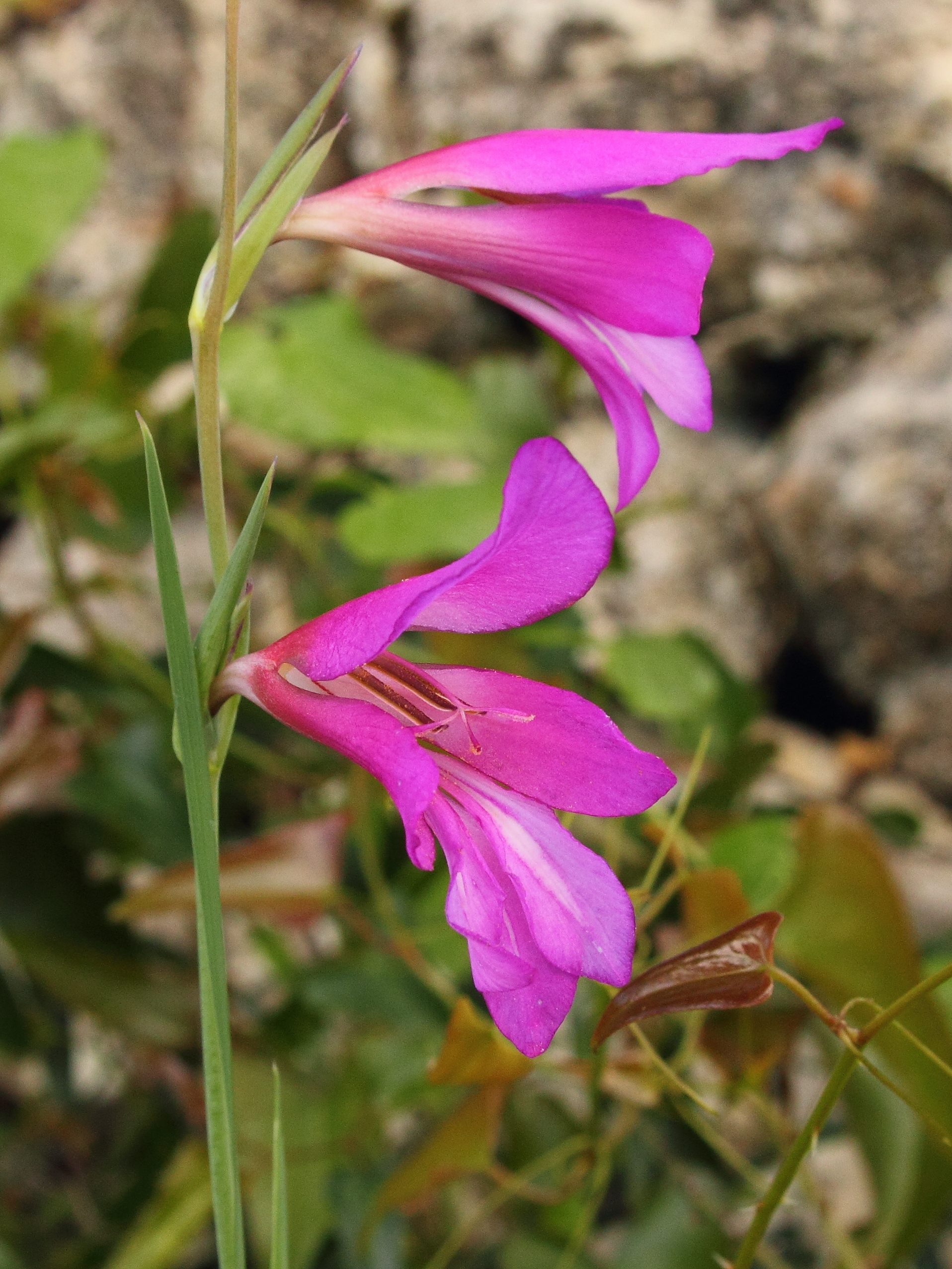
- Gladiolus illyricus in the Algarve region

Scientific classification
- Kingdom: Plantae
- Clade: Tracheophytes
- Clade: Angiosperms
- Clade: Monocots
- Order: Asparagales
- Family: Iridaceae
- Genus: Gladiolus
- Species: G. illyricus

Binomial name
- Gladiolus illyricus W.D.J.Koch

Synonyms
- Gladiolus communis subsp. illyricus (W.D.J.Koch) Bonnier & Layens; Gladiolus imbricatus proles illyricus (W.D.J.Koch) Samp.; Gladiolus glaucus Heldr. ex Halácsy; Gladiolus serotinus Welw. ex Boiss. & Reut.

= Gladiolus illyricus =

Species of flowering plant

Gladiolus illyricus, the wild gladiolus, is a flowering plant in the family Iridaceae. It is tall gladiolus that grows up to 50 centimeters (20 in) tall found in western and southern Europe, particularly around the Mediterranean region.

In Britain a small population is known in the New Forest region; Williamson suggests this population may be introduced. It became a protected species in the UK in 1975 under the Conservation of Wild Creatures and Wild Plants Act.
