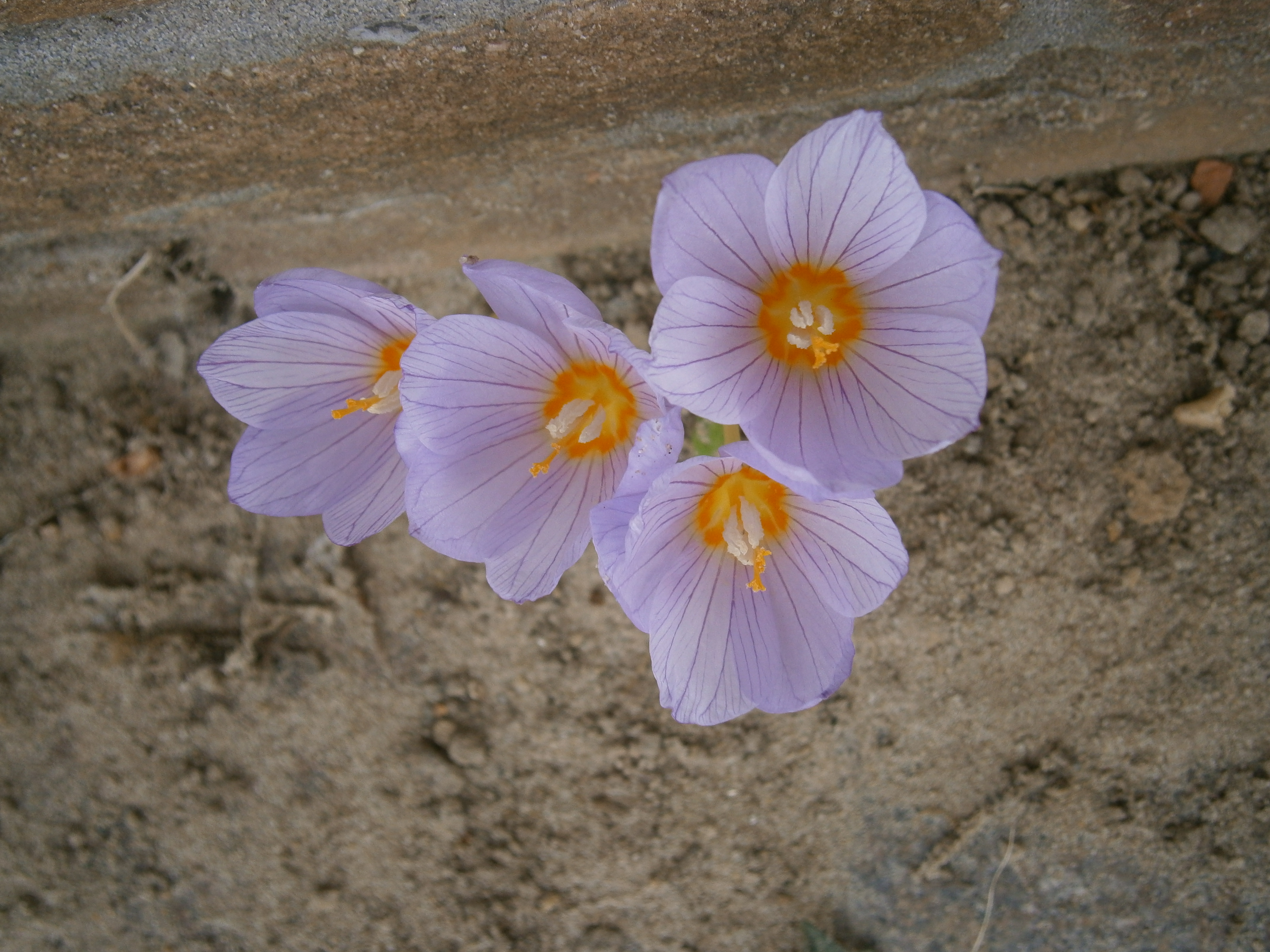

Scientific classification
- Kingdom: Plantae
- Clade: Tracheophytes
- Clade: Angiosperms
- Clade: Monocots
- Order: Asparagales
- Family: Iridaceae
- Genus: Crocus
- Section: Crocus sect. Crocus
- Species: C. kotschyanus

Binomial name
- Crocus kotschyanus K.Koch

Synonyms
- Crocus hatayensis Rukšāns; Crocus kotschyi Lenné & K.Koch; Crocus zonatus J.Gay ex Klatt

= Crocus kotschyanus =

Species of flowering plant

Crocus kotschyanus, Kotschy's crocus, is a species of flowering plant in the genus Crocus of the family Iridaceae, found from Turkey to Caucasus and Lebanon.

Growing to 10 cm (3.9 in) tall, it produces pale lilac-blue flowers in autumn, followed by sword-like leaves. It has gained the Royal Horticultural Society's Award of Garden Merit.
