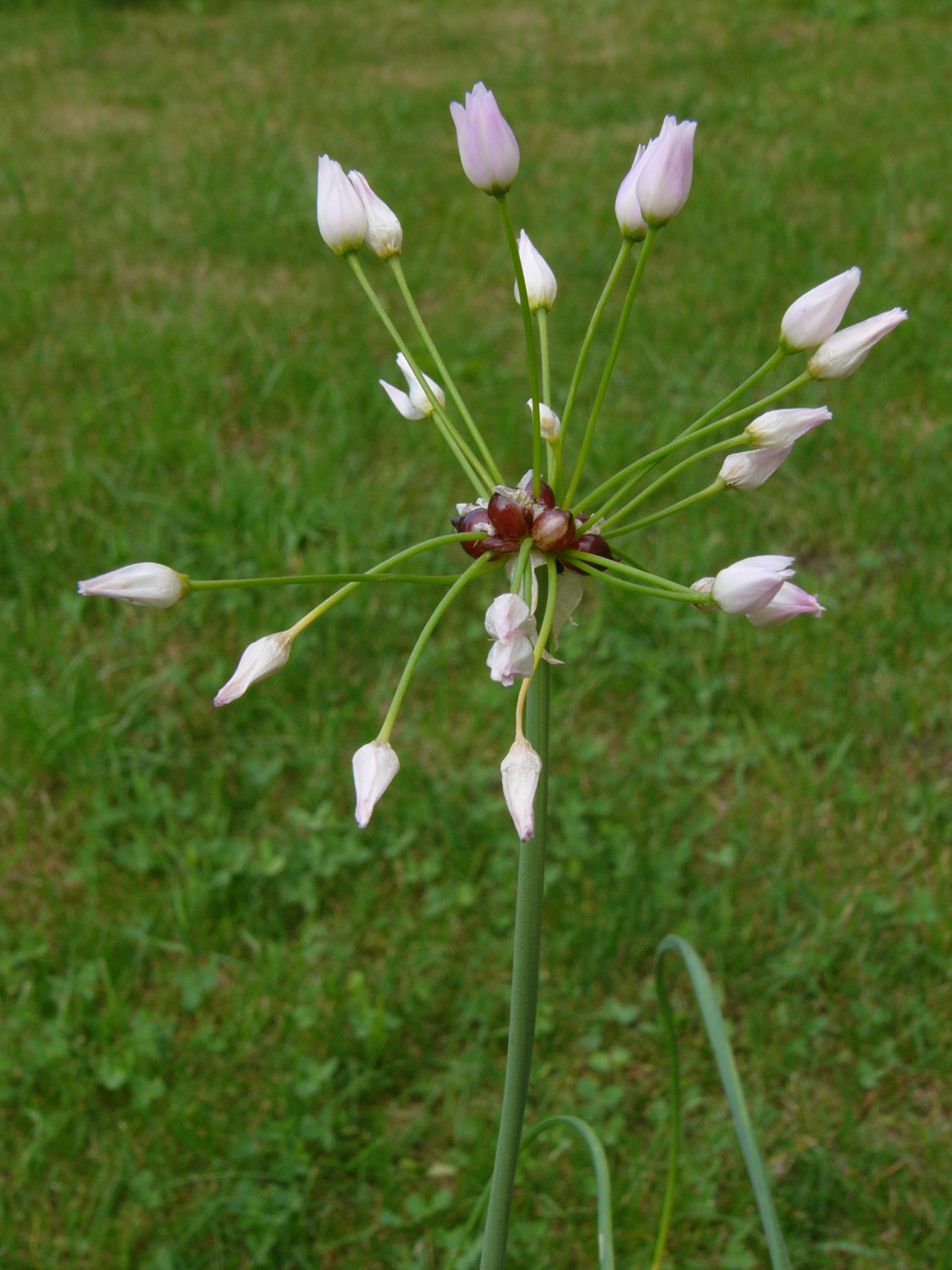

Scientific classification
- Kingdom: Plantae
- Clade: Tracheophytes
- Clade: Angiosperms
- Clade: Monocots
- Order: Asparagales
- Family: Amaryllidaceae
- Subfamily: Allioideae
- Genus: Allium
- Subgenus: A. subg. Amerallium
- Species: A. unifolium

Binomial name
- Allium unifolium Kellogg 1863

Synonyms
- Synonymy: Allium grandisceptrum Davidson; Allium unifolium Vieill. ex Greene 1894, illegitimate homonym not Kellogg 1863; Allium unifolium var. lacteum Greene

= Allium unifolium =

Species of flowering plant

Allium unifolium, the one-leaf onion or American garlic, is a North American species of wild onion. It is native to the coastal mountain ranges of California, Oregon, and Baja California. It grows on clay soils including serpentine, at elevations up to 1100 m.

Allium unifolium, despite its name, usually has 2–3 flat leaves up to 50 cm long. Bulbs, though, are usually solitary, egg-shaped, up to 2 cm long, often formed at the end of rhizomes spreading out from the parent plant. Scapes are round in cross-section, up to 80 cm tall. Flowers are up to 15 mm across; tepals usually pink but occasionally white; anthers yellow or purple.

This plant has gained the Royal Horticultural Society's Award of Garden Merit.
