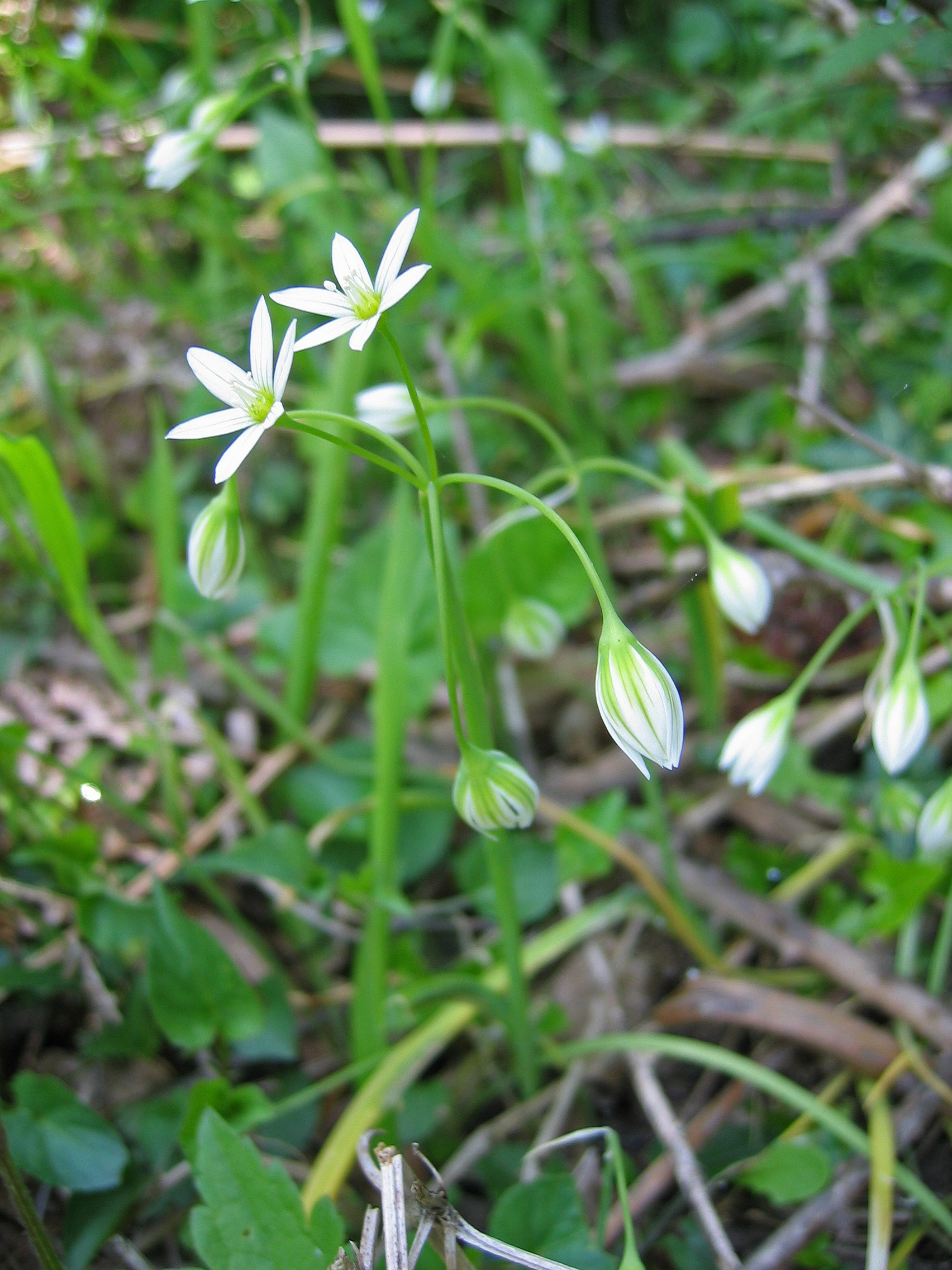

Scientific classification
- Kingdom: Plantae
- Clade: Tracheophytes
- Clade: Angiosperms
- Clade: Monocots
- Order: Asparagales
- Family: Amaryllidaceae
- Subfamily: Allioideae
- Genus: Allium
- Subgenus: A. subg. Amerallium
- Species: A. pendulinum

Binomial name
- Allium pendulinum Ten.

Synonyms
- Allium album Spreng. 1825, illegitimate homonym not Santi 1795 nor F. Delaroche 1810; Allium triquetrum Sebast. & Mauri 1818, illegitimate homonym not L. 1753 nor Lour. 1790 nor Schrad. ex Schult. & Schult f. 1830; Allium triquetrum var. pendulinum (Ten.) Regel; Allium triquetrum subsp. pendulinum (Ten.) K.Richt.; Nectaroscordum pendulinum (Ten.) Galasso & Banfi

= Allium pendulinum =

Italian garlic

Species of flowering plant

Allium pendulinum, called Italian garlic, is a plant species known only from Sardinia, Sicily, Corsica and mainland Italy.

Allium pendulinum is a perennial herb up to 25 cm tall but usually much shorter. It generally produces only leaves, both of which wither before flowering time. There is no spathe at flowering time. Umbel has only a few flowers, usually less than 10, all on long pedicels and very often drooping (nodding, hanging downward). Tepals are white, each with three thin prominent green veins; anthers cream; ovary at flowering time green.
