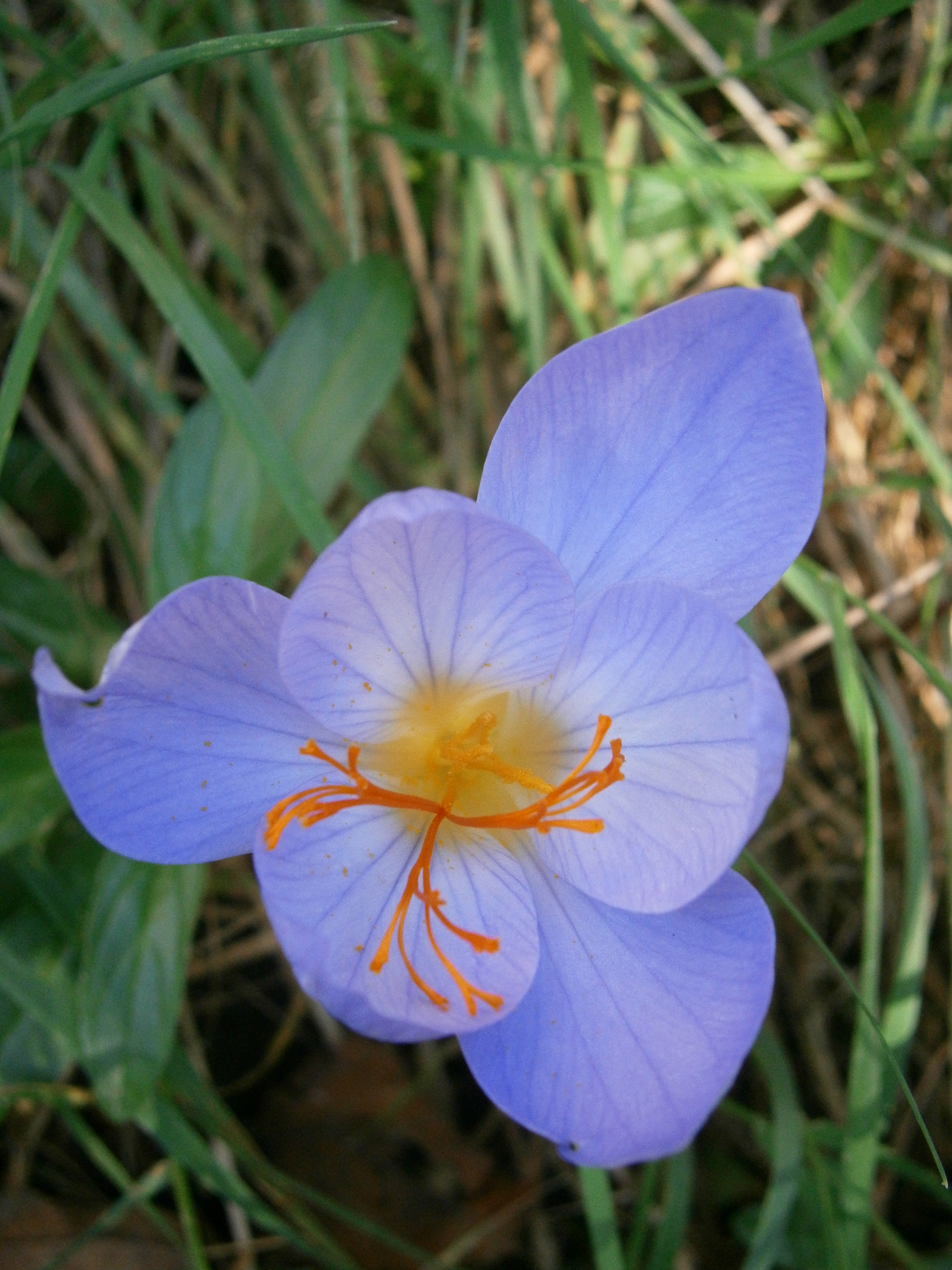
- Flower showing the divided styles

Scientific classification
- Kingdom: Plantae
- Clade: Tracheophytes
- Clade: Angiosperms
- Clade: Monocots
- Order: Asparagales
- Family: Iridaceae
- Genus: Crocus
- Species: C. speciosus

Binomial name
- Crocus speciosus M.Bieb.

= Crocus speciosus =

Species of flowering plant

Crocus speciosus, with common name Bieberstein's crocus, is a species of flowering plant in the genus Crocus of the family Iridaceae. The plant is native to northern and central Turkey, the Caucasus, northern Iran, Crimea and Bulgaria.

Crocus speciosus is a cormous perennial growing to 10–15 cm (3.9–5.9 in) tall. The lilac flowers with paler coloured throats and dark veins appear in autumn (fall). The orange styles are much-divided.

The specific epithet speciosus means "showy".

It is cultivated as an ornamental plant. As it increases rapidly, it is suitable for naturalisation in grass. The species, and the white-flowered cultivar 'Albus', have gained the Royal Horticultural Society's Award of Garden Merit.

== Subspecies ==
As listed by the World Checklist of Selected Plant Families:

- Crocus speciosus subsp. ilgazensis B.Mathew - Turkey
- Crocus speciosus subsp. speciosus - Turkey, Iran, Caucasus, Crimea
- Crocus speciosus subsp. xantholaimos B.Mathew - Sinop Province in Turkey
