= Grīņu Nature Reserve =

Protected area in Latvia

- IUCN category Ib (wilderness area)
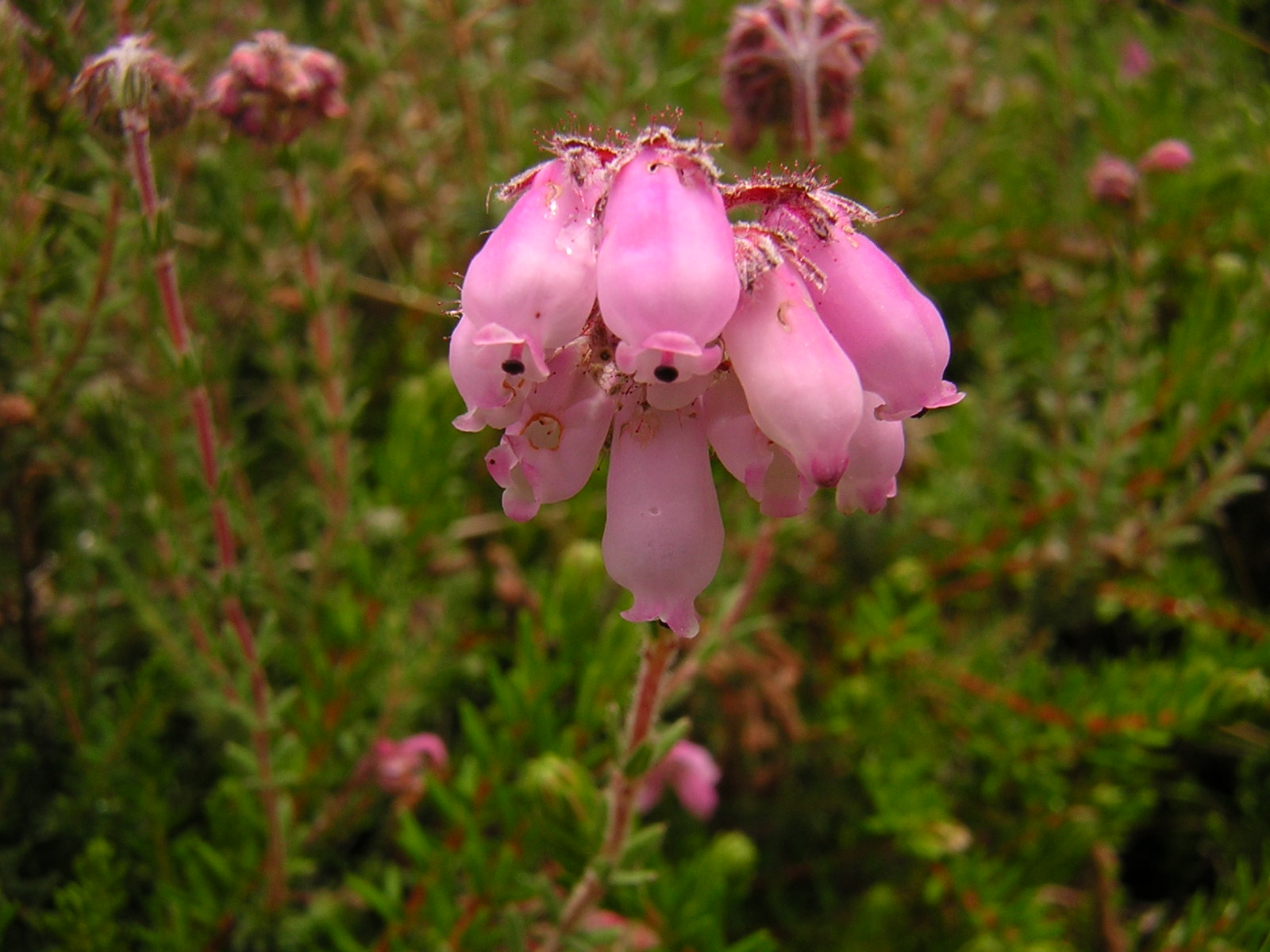
- Latvian: Grīņa sārtene. Flowers of cross-leaved heath (Erica tetralix) - the main object of protection in the Grīņu Nature Reserve.

- Location within Latvia
- Location: Latvia
- Nearest city: Pāvilosta
- Coordinates: 56°48′10″N 21°12′18″E
- Area: 15.05 km^{2} (1,505 ha)
- Established: 1936
- Governing body: Environmental Protection Board

Grīņu Nature Reserve (Latvian: Grīņu dabas rezervāts) is a nature reserve, located in Saka Parish, South Kurzeme Municipality in the Courland region of Latvia. Founded in 1936, it belongs to the European Conservation Network Natura 2000. 1,505 hectares of natural habitat are under protection. The Grīņu Reserve is subordinated to the Regional Council for Nature Conservation Courland.

The nature reserve was created to protect a very rare for Latvia plant - cross-leaved heath (Erica tetralix), as well as it inherent special biotope locally called grīnis. In addition, significant thickets of sweet gale (Myrica gale) have been preserved, an endangered species of shrubs, source of raw materials to make the famous Riga Black Balsam. Other rare plants, in particular, several species of orchids, have been found in the flora of the reserve.

== History ==
The oldest information about the lands of Grīnis is contained in folklore. According to legend, Baron Osten-Sacken, who lived here in the 17th century, divided the estate between two sons, one bequeathed the fields, and the other - forests. The owner of the forests became wealthy, and the owner of the fields became poor and set fire to the forest out of envy. Thus appeared the first heather wasteland - grīnis.

In the nineteenth century, attempts to seize these lands by fire did not stop. Locals burned grass to increase fertility, but after several years of use, such fields ceased to yield, and villagers again set fire to the forest to capture new land. Despite the irrationality of such use of nature, even foresters resorted to piles when they wanted to replace low-growing crooked forests with cultivated forest plantations. Sometimes fires broke out due to steam locomotives running on the paved railway line. In summer, the grīnis was extremely dry, so one spark from under the wheels was enough to spread the fire.

However, all human efforts to develop local lands were unsuccessful. Grīņu remained barren, and as soon as people stopped cultivating the land, they quickly overgrown with wild vegetation. Until the 1930s, the core of the modern Grīņu Reserve (about 750 hectares) was a small, but not very productive forest, bordered by unforested swamps. This area belonged to the Strautini forestry, subordinated to the Land Fund, which sold individual plots to anyone. However, due to the infertility of local lands, they were bought by only 60 poor Latgalian families, who lived by cutting down trees for sale.

Documents from the Latvian Forest Department for 1936 contain information that large thickets of cross-leaved heath (Erica tetralix) were found in the Strautini forestry. Since the main area of this species is in Western Europe, this kind of find has become a sensation in the circles of Latvian botanists. Scientists University of Latvia opposed the economic use of Grīņu's forests, and all land reclamation work and tree felling were immediately stopped. In the same year the territory was bequeathed, thus Grīņu became the third protected territory of the country after the Moricsala Nature Reserve and Slītere National Park.

During World War II and in the first years thereafter, Grīņu's forests were virtually left unattended. In 1957, these areas were again declared a nature reserve. Over the next 20 years, new areas were added to this area, where heather thickets were found so that the protected area increased to 1076 ha. In 1979, the Grīņu Reserve, while remaining a separate conservation institution, was administratively subordinated to the Slītere National Park. Since 1 February 2011 it has been managed by the Nature Protection Council of the Courland Regional Office.

== Climate ==
The Grīņu Nature Reserve is located on the coast of Baltic Sea in the temperate climate zone of the Atlantic-Continental Climate Region, which has a milder climate than in any other part of Latvia. The average annual temperature here is 6.5 °C, and its fluctuations in the seasons are relatively small. Thus, the average temperature in January was recorded at -3 °C, and the average temperature in July - at only 16 °C. Usually 700–800 mm atmospheric precipitation falls here during the year, and most of it occurs at the end of summer and autumn. Instead, winters in Grīņu are light snow with a thin and fragile layer of snow. Strong winds often blow in this area, especially in autumn, they often cause the felling of large trees.

== Geography and hydrology ==
Grīņu Nature Reserve is located in the Saka Parish of the Pāvilosta Municipality of Latvia, to the west from village Ķoniņciems, between settlements Ziemupe, Saka and Pāvilosta. The strips of land adjacent to its borders are occupied by forests of the same type as in the reserve itself, so the boundaries between the reserve and the exploited areas are invisible. Such underused farmland contributes to the preservation of Grīņu's landscapes, essentially acting as a buffer zone. The eastern edge of the protected area is crossed from north to south by a Liepāja–Ventspils Railway, traffic on which was stopped in 1996.

The territory of the reserve lies on Seaside lowlands at a distance of 10 km from the shore Baltic Sea. The absolute height of the territory is 8–12 m above sea level. Its relief is flat, with a slight slope in the direction from north to south. In some places you can see lowlands stretching for several meters to a depth of 0.5 m. They were formed in antiquity due to the gradual retreat of the sea. Other forms of microrelief are land reclamation canals. In the past, they were used to drain swamps, after the bequest they were abandoned, began to be silted up and overgrown. Forest roads are often laid along such canals on the embankments of the excavated soil. Groundwater in reserve is close to the surface. Soil is very wet in spring and autumn and dries up in summer. This creates conditions for frequent fires in summertime. There are no large reservoirs within the reserve. It is crossed by two small forest rivers: in the north of the protected area flows the Lielā Kārpa, and in the south - Mazā Kārpa. Lielā Kārpa has a valley 4–6 m wide and high shores, but its drainage capacity is insignificant and already at a distance of tens of meters from riverbed you can see wetlands. Mazā Kārpa has impassable, swampy shores and is more like a reclamation canal than a river. At the end of the 20th century, it included Lake Grīņu with an area of 2 ha, but due to eutrophic processes its water surface is constantly decreasing.

== Soils and landscapes ==
The entire territory of the Grīņu Reserve is lined with a thick three-meter layer of fine-grained sands, under which are moraine sediments, sometimes with layers of gravel. These geological rocks were formed during the retreat of the ancient Baltic Sea. Under these conditions several soil types developed. The peat-podzolic-clay soil characterized by organic layer of peat only 10 cm thick, sometimes with intrusions of coal layers - traces of past forest fires. Turf-podzolic soils are formed on the elevated places along the banks of the Lielā Kārpa, and peat-clay soils. However, there are no conditions for the formation of a thick layer of peat in the reserve because all the low-lying areas receive excess moisture in the cold season, and in summer completely dry up.

Homogeneity hydrological regime, climatic conditions and soil cover determines the uniformity of the landscape of the reserve: 94% of its territory is covered with forests, 5% are meadows and shrubs and heathers; falls on the former cultivated lands. Grīņu's scenery cannot be called breathtaking. Most of the territory is occupied by low and sparse forests, only on the elevated banks of the river Lielā Kārpa tall slender pines with elegant spruces grow to a limited extent.

Open biocenosis and Grīņu include natural meadows and wastelands, confined to the former hayfields, gardens, cemeteries. It is the meadows, overgrown with heather and shrubs, called grīnis. This landscape is not typical for the Eastern Baltic, so it is carefully protected. Scientists have not yet reached a definitive conclusion about the origin of grīnis. Some consider it a natural biotope formed in unique local conditions, others suggest that the development of grīnis is closely related to human activities, in particular, fires, because without the influence of this factor grīnis quickly overgrown with forest.

== Flora ==
The value of the Grīņu Nature Reserve is that, despite the uniformity of landscapes, it is characterized by botanical diversity. According to incomplete estimates alone, about 300 species vascular plants have been found in its territory, including 33 - rare for Latvia. Approximately 80% of the reserve is covered with pine and birch woodlands with continuous shrub or herbaceous cover. This type of vegetation is locally called grīnis (hence the name of the reserve). This type covers only 0.3% of Latvia's total forest area. Depending on the microrelief, two types of grīnis are distinguished: sphagnum-heather (in elevated areas) and sedge-molin (in low areas covered with hummocks). In the sphagnum-heather grīnis, the arboreal layer is formed by pines, the lower layer is formed by a continuous cover of heather, xerophytic lichens and hygrophytic mosses; there is no undergrowth. In the sedge-molin grīnis, the arboreal layer is also formed by pines, but with a significant admixture of birch, in some places willow undergrowth is developed, interspersed with buckthorn and juniper. Sedges, the common marsh bedstraw (Galium palustre), purple loosestrife (Lythrum salicaria), devil's-bit scabious (Succisa pratensis), and moor grass (Molinia) are common between the hummocks.

Plant communities of Grīņu reserve can be clearly divided into two types: forests and meadows.

=== Forest flora ===
Forest phytocenoses are represented by forests and birches, in which trees have a depressed appearance. They have thin and crooked trunks of Baltic pine (Pinus sylvestris) and European white birch (Betula pubescens) covered with lichen, trees often have broken tops, in places tree stratum sparse so that the forest is dumped on upper swamp. In summer, the landscape is enlivened by a tall cover of grass (Poaceae) and common heather (Calluna vulgaris). But these wet forests differ from real swamps in that they receive a large amount of moisture mainly in autumn and dry up almost completely in summer. Because of this, their species composition combines the features of hygrophytic (moisture-loving) and xerophytic (drought-resistant) vegetation. Alder buckthorn (Frangula alnus) and juniper (Juniperus) have been observed in the undergrowth of such forests, European blueberry (Vaccinium myrtillus), blueberry (Cyanococcus), wavy hair-grass (Deschampsia flexuosa), stiff clubmoss (Spinulum annotinum) predominate in the grass cover, May lily (Maianthemum bifolium), purple moor-grass (Molinia caerulea), heath wood-rush (Luzula multiflora), common heather (Calluna vulgaris), pill sedge (Carex pilulifera), arctic starflower (Lysimachia europaea), common cow-wheat (Melampyrum pratense) There are also many oppressed bushes lingonberry (Vaccinium vitis-idaea).

=== Moist meadows flora ===
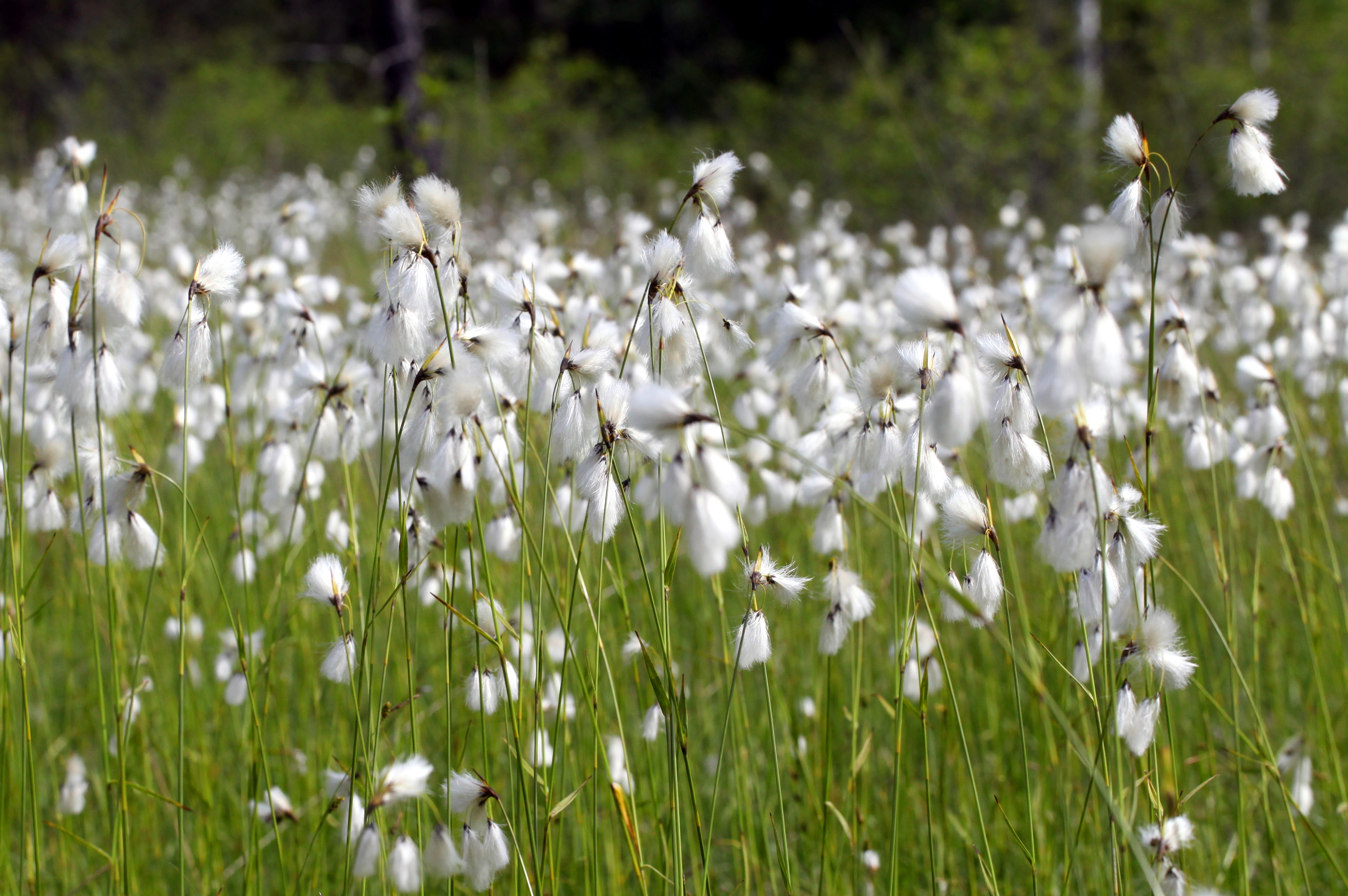
Flowering broad leaved cotton grass (Eriophorum latifolium).

The phytocenoses of the open type are dominated by species inherent in moist meadows, especially those that do not require fertile soils. The species of these habitats are formed by common cottonsedge (Eriophorum angustifolium) and broad leaved cotton grass (Eriophorum latifolium), as well as various specimens of sedge grass (Carex): black sedge (Carex nigra), club sedge (Carex buxbaumii), silvery sedge (Carex canescens), woollyfruit sedge (Carex lasiocarpa), oval sedge (Carex leporina), carnation sedge (Carex panicea), tawny sedge (Carex hostiana) etc. Among these herbs are impurities of unpretentious grass (Poaceae) - blue moor-grass (Sesleria caerulea), purple moor-grass (Molinia caerulea), purple small-reed (Calamagrostis canescens). They are joined by representatives of weeds, among which the most common are common marsh bedstraw (Galium palustre), devil's-bit scabious (Succisa pratensis), marsh marigold (Caltha palustris), buckbean (Menyanthes), marsh cinquefoil (Comarum palustre), marsh hog's fennel (Peucedanum palustre) and to a lesser extent yellow iris (Iris pseudacorus), marsh lousewort (Pedicularis palustris), tufted loosestrife (Lysimachia thyrsiflora). Of the shrubs in the meadows common rosemary leaved willow (Salix rosmarinifolia). Interestingly, the purple moor-grass (Molinia caerulea), both in forests and meadows, forms the characteristic rounded mounds.

=== Dry meadows flora ===
A separate type of plant groups of open places are species of dry meadows. They grow on small areas that were once cultivated. Several species of fescue (Festuca) and meadow grass (Poa), broadleaf plantain (Plantago major), common mugwort (Artemisia vulgaris), field thistle (Cirsium arvense) were found around the abandoned buildings, along the railway and on both sides of the forest roads silverweed (Argentina anserina), yellow toadflax (Linaria vulgaris).

=== Protected and rare flora ===
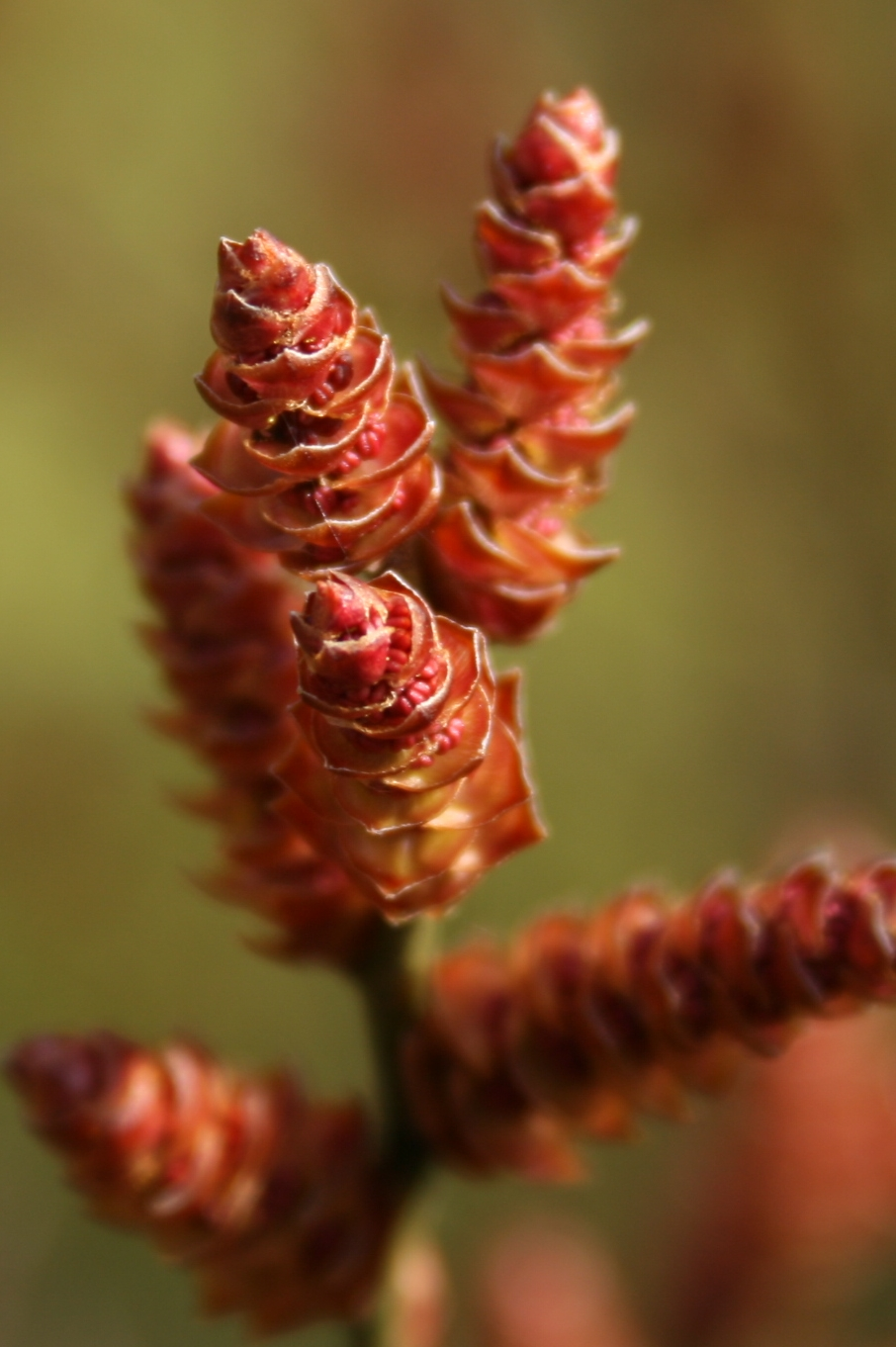
Male inflorescences of sweet gale (Myrica gale).

Crossleaf heath (Erica tetralix) is widespread throughout the Grīņu Preserve and its surroundings, but this plant prefers open sunny places. Crossleaf heath loves light soils - dry in summer and moist in autumn. In Latvia, this species can not compete with other plants and at the slightest deterioration of conditions disappears with the grass. The overgrowth of open areas with forest is especially harmful for it. During flowering, crossleaf heath looks attractive due to the pink flowers-glasses, but often goes unnoticed by outsiders, because it looks like common heather (Calluna vulgaris) and blooms at the same time.

Another object of protection - sweet gale (Myrica gale) - in Grīņu reserve is very common. Its fragrant buds are used to prepare the famous Riga Black Balsam, due to which this shrub quickly disappears. On the territory of the reserve such preparations are prohibited and the population of waxwort is in excellent condition.

Among other rare plants, ornamental species such as martagon lily (Lilium martagon), harsh downy-rose (Rosa tomentosa), lesser butterfly-orchid (Platanthera bifolia), European columbine (Aquilegia vulgaris), common spotted-orchid (Dactylorhiza fuchsii) and heath spotted-orchid (Orchis maculata). Less showy, but also subject to protection curved sicklegrass (Parapholis incurva), allseed flax (Radiola linoides), club sedge (Carex buxbaumii) and tawny sedge (Carex hostiana), marsh pea (Lathyrus palustris), northern firmoss (Huperzia selago), downy willow (Salix lapponum) and close to it creeping willow (Salix repens).

== Fauna ==
Fauna of the Grīņu Reserve has been little studied. The reason for this is both the botanical focus of conservation activities and the small size of the protected area, which does not allow to maintain large animal populations within its boundaries. Species found in the reserve belong to Palearctic faunal area. They are dominated by inhabitants of deciduous forests — red deer (Cervus elaphus), European hare (Lepus europaeus), wild boar (Sus scrofa), European mink (Mustela lutreola), European pine marten (Martes martes) etc. Less common boreal mammals and birds: mountain hare (Lepus timidus), moose (Alces alces), Eurasian lynx (Lynx lynx), red squirrel (Sciurus vulgaris), European badger (Meles meles). The largest predators of the reserve are wolf (Canis lupus), and also play a role red fox (Vulpes vulpes). Of the acclimatized species in Latvia, only raccoon dog (Nyctereutes procyonoides), enter the reserve.

Among the birds of Grīņu are almost ubiquitous common chaffinch (Fringilla coelebs), European robin (Erithacus rubecula), great tit (Parus major), marsh tit (Poecile palustris), willow tit (Poecile montanus), quite common are black grouse (Lyrurus tetrix). Of the large birds in the Grīņu Reserve, several nesting pairs of white (Ciconia ciconia) and black stork (Ciconia nigra) have been observed. A total of 16 species of native birds belong to the rare species.

== Economic and scientific activity ==
As already mentioned in the "History" section, people have been trying to manage the lands of the reserve for a long time, but practically no branch of either agriculture or forestry here had any prospects for development. Cultivated lands were infertile, more or less acceptable on them gave birth only buckwheat, oats and potatoes. At the same time, the cultivation of arable land took a long time, given that they first had to be freed from forest and snags. Pastures were of no value, as marsh plants were generally not very nutritious fodder for cattle. Only deforestation was profitable, but attempts to plant groves of black alder and birch in place of low-grade pines were also unsuccessful.

Including because of this, the establishment of the reserve regime was quick and without complications. Already in the year of the founding of the Grīņu Nature Reserve, it was forbidden to cut down trees, graze cattle and drain wetlands. The lands of the reserve were finally depopulated after the Second World War, as most of the local Latgalians were deported or emigrated. Over time, such neglect led to the rapid renewal of stands, around the farms began to grow Aspen and birch. However, full afforestation of the territory is also not desirable, as it will eliminate the favorable conditions for the growth of the main objects of protection - cross-leaved heath (Erica tetralix) and sweet gale (Myrica gale). Indirectly on Ecosystems, Grīņu land has reclamation measures in the surrounding lands, which since the second half of the 20th century has led to a marked eutrophication of water bodies and swamps.

Currently, the reserve has a strict protection regime, the free crossing of borders by outsiders is prohibited, and for scientific purposes it can be visited only with the permission of the staff of the Slytherin National Park. In the buffer zone of the reserve it is allowed to change the vegetation in the framework of scientific experiments (for example, to conduct test piles). Also in the Grīņu Reserve are partially preserved objects of historical heritage of Latgalians: the cemetery, the buildings of the village "Ceriņi"

The first research of this territory was carried out by Karl Reinhold Kupffer (1872—1935). In 1898, from material collected in Grīņu, he compiled herbarium, which is now stored at the University of Latvia. K. Kupffer confirmed the growth of the cross-leaved heath (Erica tetralix) in these places (the first mention of it dates back to 1846), but the confirmation of the significant size of the population required for the bequest was made only in the late 1930s. In the 1950s, J. Gailis began a systematic study of grīnis. He conducted several interesting experiments on its afforestation, studied soils, types and structure of vegetation. During the same period, other Latvian foresters occasionally joined the study of grīnis. In 1984, M.Lavins described in detail the history of the reserve

== See also ==
- List of protected areas of Latvia
