= Fallowlees Flush =

Protected area in Northumberland, England

- Site of Special Scientific Interest
- Location within Northumberland
- Location of Fallowlees Flush.
- Area of search: Northumberland
- Grid reference: NZ 030937
- Coordinates: 55.236901°N 1.952576°W
- Interest: Biological
- Area: 2.4 hectares (5.9 acres)
- Notification date: 1990
- Location map: DEFRA MAGIC map

Fallowlees Flush is the name given to a Site of Special Scientific Interest (SSSI) in mid-Northumberland, England. The steeply sloping site has calcium-rich springs supporting vegetation rare in the county.

== Location and natural features ==
Fallowlees Flush is situated in the north-east of England in the county of Northumberland, to the west of Fontburn Reservoir and the east of Harwood Forest, 7.8 kilometres (4.8 mi) west-north-west of Netherwitton and 4.5 kilometres (2.8 mi) east-south-east of Forestburn Gate. The 2.4 hectares (5.9 acres) site is situated on a north-east facing slope descending from 210 metres (690 ft) to 190 metres (620 ft), above sea level above a stream feeding the reservoir.

== Flora ==
Flora on the site grades from species rich areas fed by lime-rich springs, through to a wooded fringe by the stream. The SSSI citation sets out four distinct groups of vegetation.

Moss-dominated turf dominates areas where springs arise, and are characterised by stonewort (Charales), flea-sedge (Carex pulicaris), tawny sedge (Carex hostiana), long-stalked yellow-sedge (Carex lepidocarpa) and broad-leaved cottongrass (Eriophorum latifolium).

A wider area is influenced by the springs, and in addition to the sedges and cottongrass, supports dioecious sedge (Carex dioica), marsh lousewort (Pedicularis palustris), creeping willow (Salix repens), devil's-bit scabious (Succisa pratensis), purple moor-grass (Molinia caerulea), marsh cinquefoil (Potentilla palustris), meadowsweet (Filipendula ulmaria), jointed rush (Juncus articulatus) as well as common butterwort (Pinguicula vulgaris), grass-of-Parnassus (Parnassia palustris), marsh valerian (Valeriana dioica), and early marsh-orchid (Dactylorhiza incarnata).

More acidic areas of the site support water plants such as oval sedge (Carex leporina (Note: C. leporina is often called by the nom. illeg. synonym Carex ovalis.)) and star sedge (Carex echinata), as well as greater amounts of jointed rush.

Woodland areas by the stream are composed of alder (Alnus glutinosa), downy birch (Betula pubescens) and hazel (Corylus avellana). Ground flora in the woodland area includes tufted hair-grass (Deschampsia cespitosa), water avens (Geum rivale), wood crane’s-bill (Geranium sylvaticum) and a substantial stand of lesser pond-sedge (Carex acutiformis).

The condition of Fallowlees Flush was judged to be favourable in 2011, with some concerns about bracken encroachment noted.

== See also ==
- List of Sites of Special Scientific Interest in Northumberland
