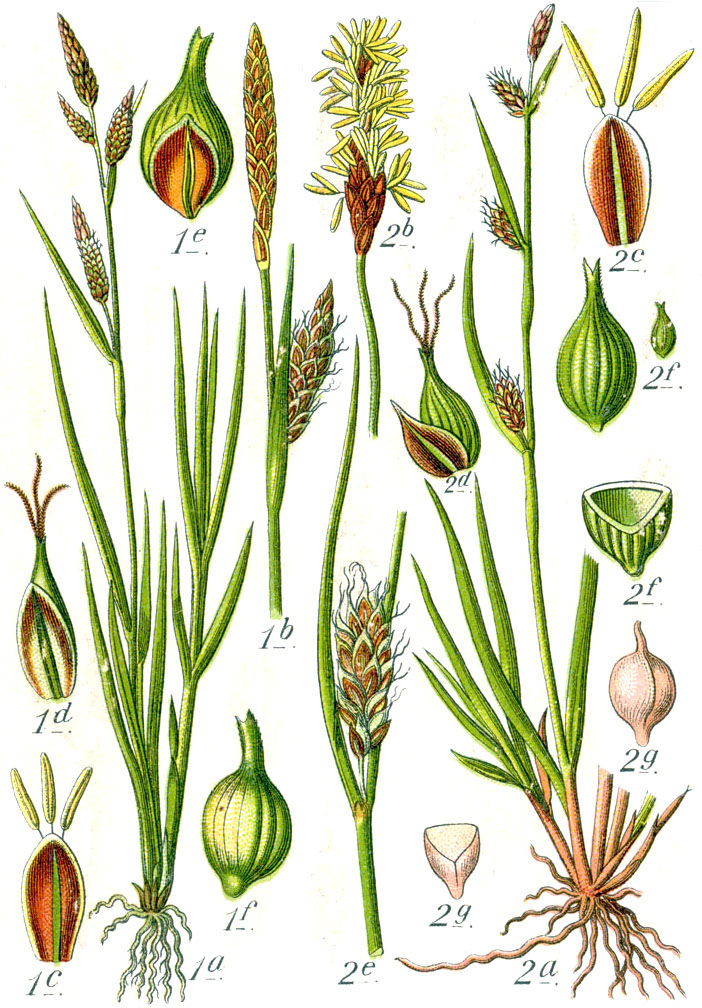

Scientific classification
- Kingdom: Plantae
- Clade: Tracheophytes
- Clade: Angiosperms
- Clade: Monocots
- Clade: Commelinids
- Order: Poales
- Family: Cyperaceae
- Genus: Carex
- Species: C. × xanthocarpa

Binomial name
- Carex × xanthocarpa Degl.

Synonyms
- Carex × chevalieri Corb.; Carex × juncea Scop.; Carex × xanthina Fernald

= Carex × xanthocarpa =

Species of grass-like plant

Carex × xanthocarpa is a hybrid species of sedge and is native to Europe and Quebec in Canada. Its parents are Carex flava and Carex hostiana.
