= Pāvilosta Port =

Port in Latvia

- Click on the map for a fullscreen view

Location
- Country: Latvia
- Coordinates: 56°53′18″N 21°10′28″E

Statistics
- Website pavilostaport.lv

Pāvilosta Port (Latvian: Pāvilostas osta) is the port authority of Pāvilosta, Latvia. The port is located near the Saka River.
