= Pakistānas kebabs =

Fast food chain

- Industry: Catering
- Founded: 2014; 12 years ago
- Area served: Rīga, Liepāja, Jelgava, Sigulda, Ventspils, Latvija
- Production output: Kebabs

Pakistānas kebabs is a fast food chain in Latvia. It has outlets in Riga, Liepaja, Jelgava, Sigulda and Ventspils. The first kebab shop was opened in 2012.

At the end of 2012, the owner of the chain, Ali Sadiq Farman, complained about repeated acts of vandalism against the company and him and the lack of interest of the police in investigating the cases. "Along with 5 other kebab places, Pakistan Kebab was included in the 2016 Kebabbloggers' list of the tastiest kebab places in Riga, which highlighted the service at Pakistan Kebab, the good prices and the bicycle parking facilities.

In April 2016, the company's branch at 17-19 Merķeļa Street was temporarily closed due to hygiene violations, but it reopened about a week later after the violations were corrected and the Food and Veterinary Service (FVS) granted permission. During the PVD raid, the owner of the eatery, Farman, assaulted the accompanying TV3 cameraman and broke his camera, for which a criminal case has been initiated.

In August 2019, due to gross violations of hygiene requirements, the PVD suspended two other establishments operating under the "Pakistānas kebab" brand in Riga - at 14-2 Lienes Street and 79A Aleksandra Čaka Street. At the end of the month, they resumed their operations with the permission of the PVD. Between 2016 and 2019, the PVD suspended a total of 10 establishments operating under the "Pakistānas kebaba" brand for non-compliance with hygiene requirements.
