= Liepāja–Ventspils Railway =

Railway in Latvia

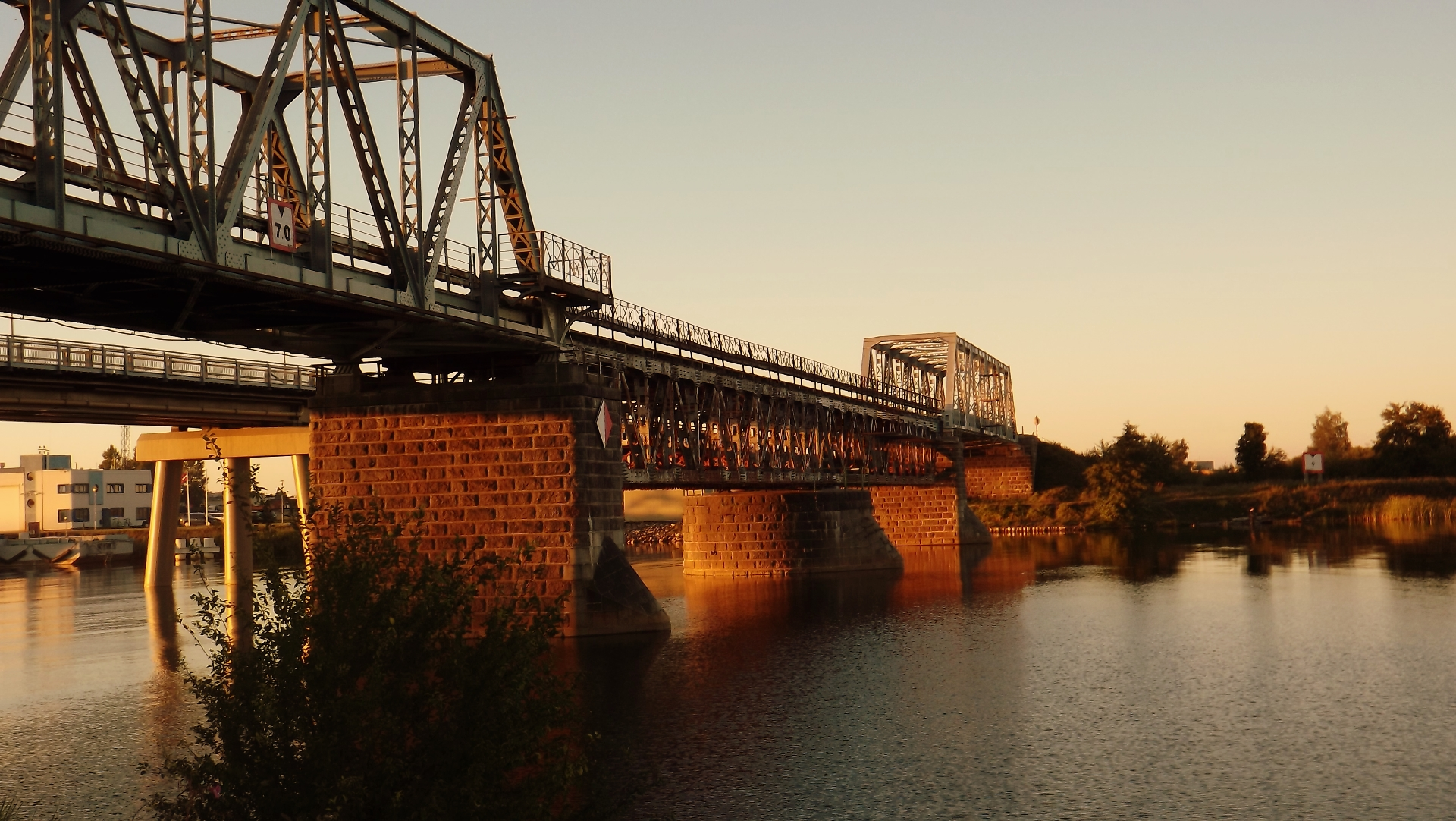
- Railway bridge over Venta in Ventspils.

Overview
- Status: closed
- Locale: Latvia
- Termini: Liepāja; Ventspils
- Stations: 19

History
- Opened: December 1944
- Closed: August 4, 1996

Technical
- Line length: 121 km (75 mi)
- Track gauge: 1520mm

Liepāja–Ventspils Railway was a 121 kilometres long railway built in the 20th century. Until 1996 there was running passenger trains. This railway has been dismantled since 2009.

== History ==
In 1912-1913 a provisional narrow-gauge (600 mm) line was built from Liepaja to Ziemupe, intended for the transportation of stones to the Port of Liepāja, and at the beginning of the First World War - a narrow-gauge line between Pāvilosta and Alsunga. On June 6, 1928, the Latvian Seim adopted a resolution on the construction of a narrow-gauge line Liepaja - Ziemupe - Pāvilosta - Alsunga (Alshvanga), but a little later it was decided that the line passing through such sparsely populated areas would be unprofitable and the line to Alsunga was planned to be built through Vērgale, from track 750 mm. The line was ready on August 14, 1932, and in order not to make a detour, they did not start it in Pāvilosta, which was later connected to the line by a 3-kilometer branch from Upenieki station (since 1933 - Kursa). In 1933, it was decided to extend the line to Kuldiga and on September 1, 1935, the Alsunga - Kuldiga section was put into operation. In 1939, construction began on the Tukums - Kuldiga section. Before the start of World War II, only 8 km of track had been laid from Tukums II station.

=== World War II ===
When in 1944 the German troops found themselves in the Courland Pocket, the Ventspils - Tukums and Liepaja - Biksta railway lines that remained at their disposal were isolated from each other and they were hastily connected by the Berzupe - Dzhukste line, but it was also soon occupied by Soviet troops. The Germans decided to build the next bypass line as far as possible from the front line and it turned out to be the most convenient to connect Liepaja and Ventspils through Alsunga. The unfinished bridge across the river Venta just came in handy. This bridge began to be built before the First World War for the Ventspils - Kuldiga branch, which, due to the war, remained only on paper. In December 1944, the first trains passed the Liepaja - Alsunga section along the new line, which was changed to the European gauge (the narrow gauge rails were not removed - they remained between the broad gauge ones).

=== Post-war period ===
Post-war the new line was given great strategic importance by the USSR, where it ended up in the border zone of a special regime. It was preserved and rebuilt with a track gauge of 1524 mm. Passenger traffic also appeared on the line. An isolated narrow-gauge section Alsunga - Kuldiga has also survived, along which a cargo-passenger train ran until 1963, and, unlike the Liepaja-Ventspils broad-gauge line with one pair of passenger trains per day, two pairs were envisaged here. Cargo transportation on the site was carried out until 1974, for the needs of the Vulkan woodworking plant in Kuldiga, after which, due to the critical condition of the tracks, the site was dismantled. The Kursa-Pāvilosta branch was dismantled earlier, shortly after the end of the war.

On April 30, 1974, a locomotive passing along the Liepaja - Ventspils line caused one of the largest forest fires in history of Latvia. Then, in Vergala (Liepaja's main forestry), the fire spread to an area of 2330 hectares (of which 2194 hectares of forest). The fire was fueled by strong winds and dry grass in the area where young pine trees were planted in the Grīņu Nature Reserve. Three people from the Krasnoyarsk Forestry Institute took part in the investigation of the causes of the fire. When considering the circumstances of the case in Moscow, the interests of Liepaja timber merchants were represented by forester Ivars Petersons and employee of the Ministry of Forest Protection Arnis Roga.

After World War II, passenger traffic on the line was mainly supported by freight-passenger trains, in which two or three cars immediately behind the locomotive were passenger, and the rest were freight cars. After the branch to Alsunga was closed, one passenger train was left, which departed from Ventspils early in the morning, and departed from Liepaja on the way back in the late afternoon. The travel time along the entire line was just over 4 hours. The last train No. 951 departed from Liepaja on July 3, 1996 and from Ventspils on July 4, 1996 (No. 952).

Initially, most of the stopping points on the line had a passing siding, which, in particular, was associated with the task of exporting timber and other goods to Liepaja and later to Ventspils. In 1990, 4 stations with passing siding remained on the line, at which trains could pass: Vergale, Riva, Alsunga and Zuras. Before the closure of the line, it was only Riva and Alsunga, and in 2009, shortly before the closure, Riva was already the only station with passing siding.

=== Dismantling of the tracks ===
The dismantling of the tracks on the line was completed at the end of 2009 and all that remains of it is the bridge over the Rīva, the bridge over the Venta and the access roads of the Ventspils station on the left bank of the river.

== See also ==
- Rail transport in Latvia
- History of rail transport in Latvia
