= Fontburn =

Reservoir in Northumberland, England

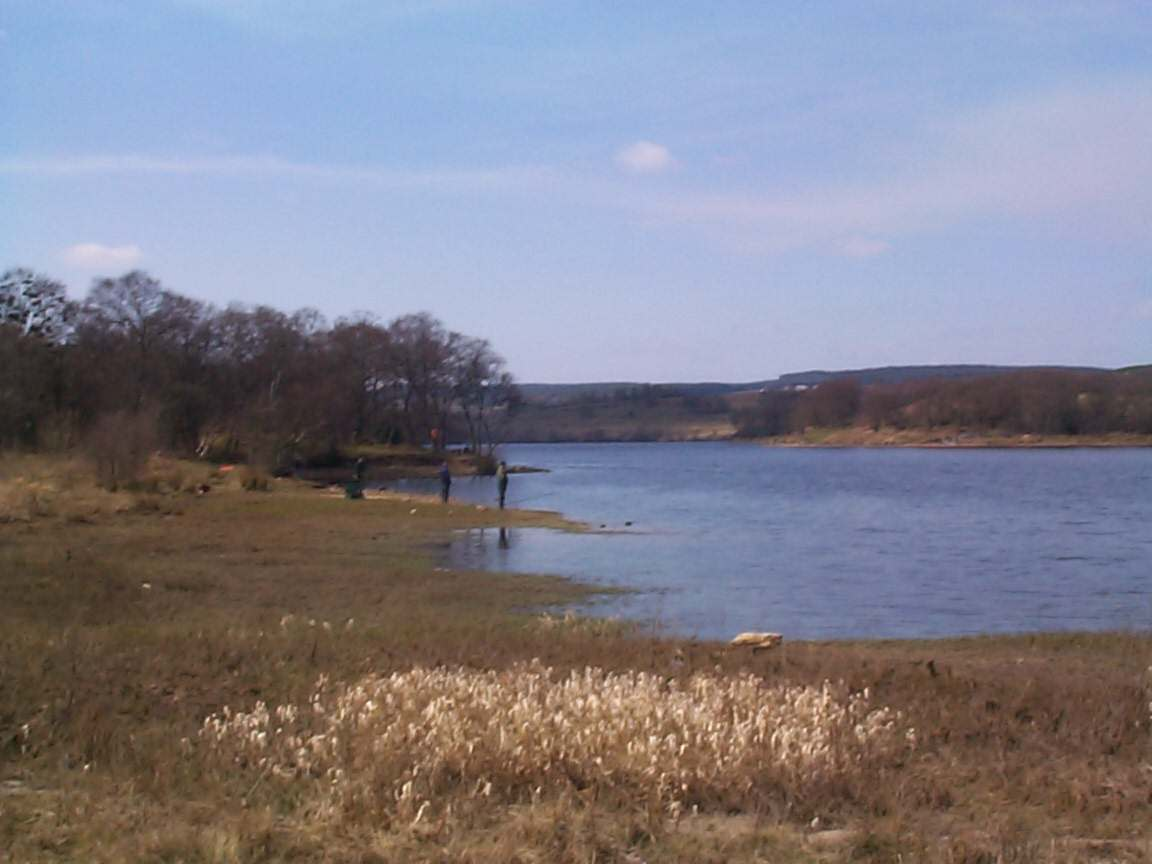
- Fontburn reservoir

- Location in Northumberland
- Location: Northumberland, England, UK
- Coordinates: 55.236°N 1.931°W grid reference NZ045935
- Type: reservoir
- Basin countries: United Kingdom

Fontburn is a drinking water reservoir situated 10 miles (16 km) northwest of the market town of Morpeth, and immediately to the east of Harwood Forest in Northumberland, England. It has a surface area of 34.979 ha and a mean depth of 9.644 m, a catchment area of 3061 ha, and is situated at 185 m altitude.

== History ==
The reservoir was built at the end of the 19th century to provide drinking water for parts of southeast Northumberland.

== Flora and fauna ==
The north shore is mainly vegetated with scrub and woodland, including willow, blackthorn, elder, birch, hawthorn, and hazel. Common spotted orchids grow in the base-rich flushed areas. At the extreme south eastern corner of the site there is an area of marshy grassland with abundant meadow-sweet, wild angelica, common knapweed, and sneezewort and where there is periodic flooding of the shore you can also find species like common spike rush, reed canary grass, lesser spearwort, and amphibious bistort.

The presence of four British reptiles; common lizard, adder, slowworm, and grass snake, and five of Britain's native amphibians; common frog, common toad, smooth newt, palmate newt, and great crested newt mean that this an extremely valuable and important wildlife site. The grass snake records for Fontburn make this one of the most northerly authenticated colonies of this species in Britain.

A Site of Special Scientific Interest, Fallowlees Flush, lies immediately to the west of Fontburn, on the slopes of one of its tributary streams.

== Fishing ==
The reservoir is regularly stocked with trout and is a favoured place with fresh water anglers. As one of the operator's smaller sites, Fontburn Reservoir claims "a reputation as being a friendly, family orientated fishery". For more information on visiting Fontburn Reservoir go to NWWaterside Parks.

== Ancient monuments ==
Close to the reservoir there are ancient Bronze Age sites which are easily reached on foot. The area is also popular with hill walkers.

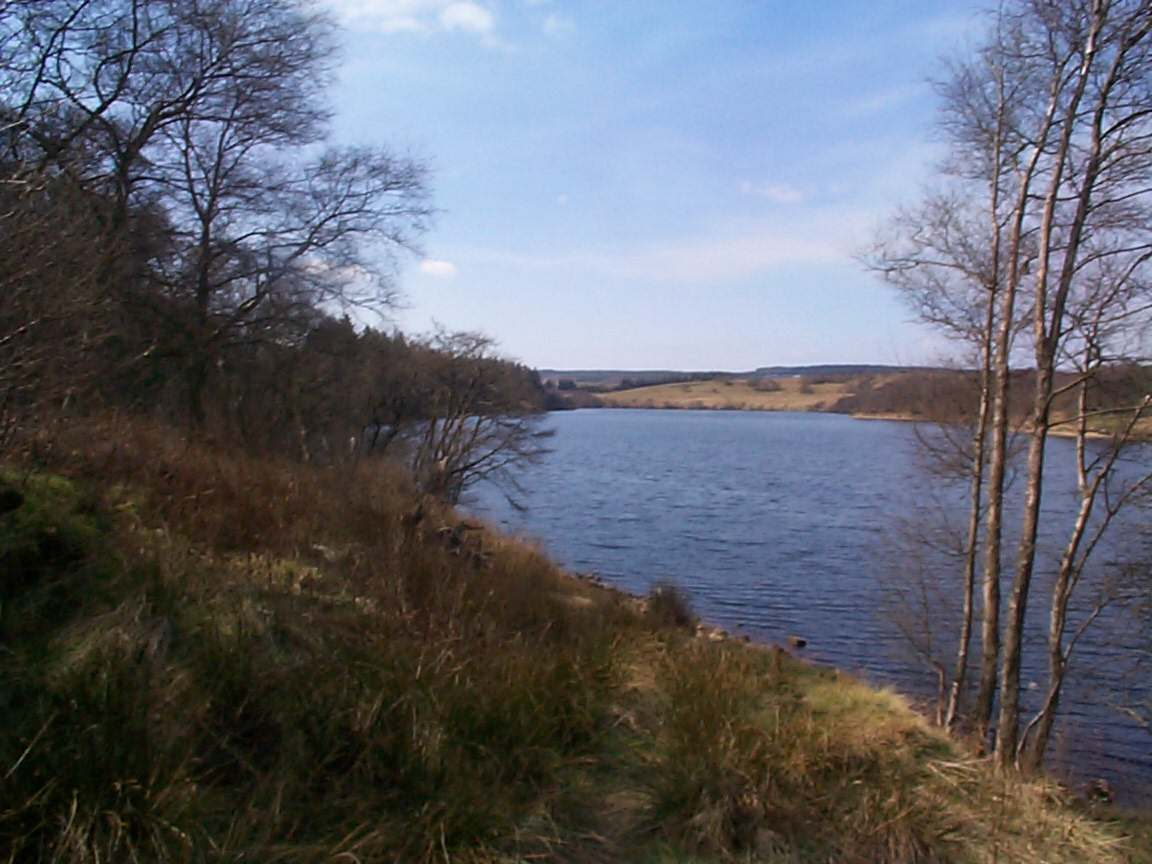
Reservoir View

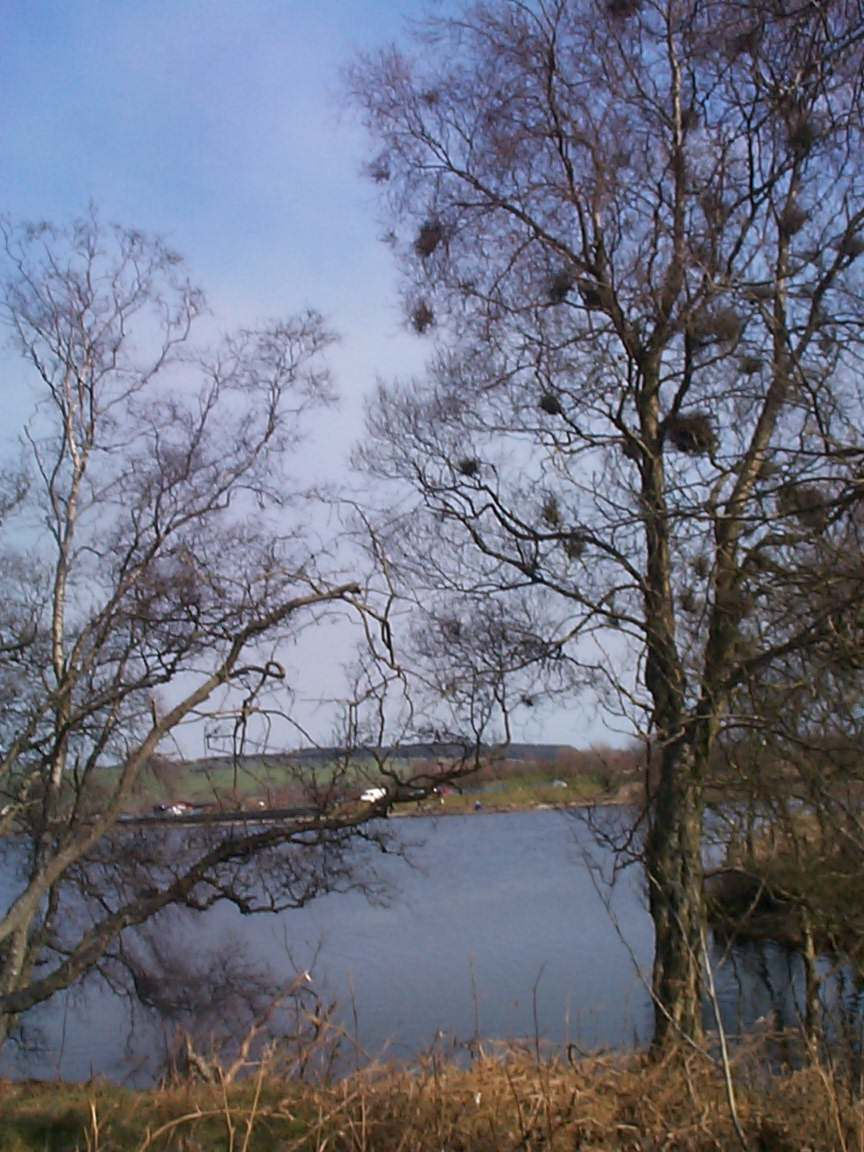
Fontburn reservoir

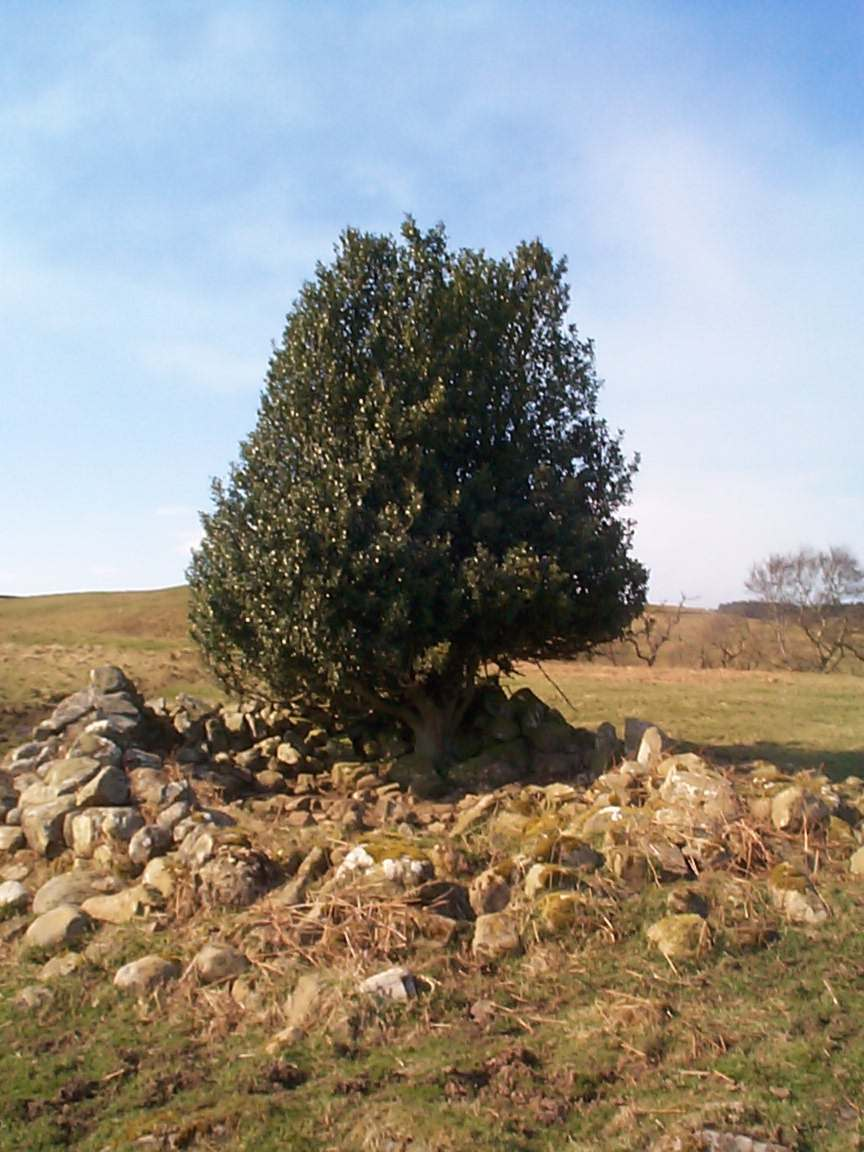
Ancient Bronze Age mounds

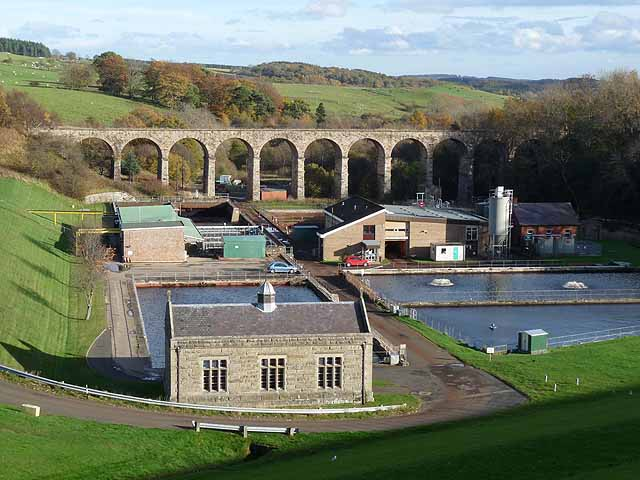
Water treatment works
