= Moricsala Nature Reserve =

Protected area in Latvia

- IUCN category Ib (wilderness area)
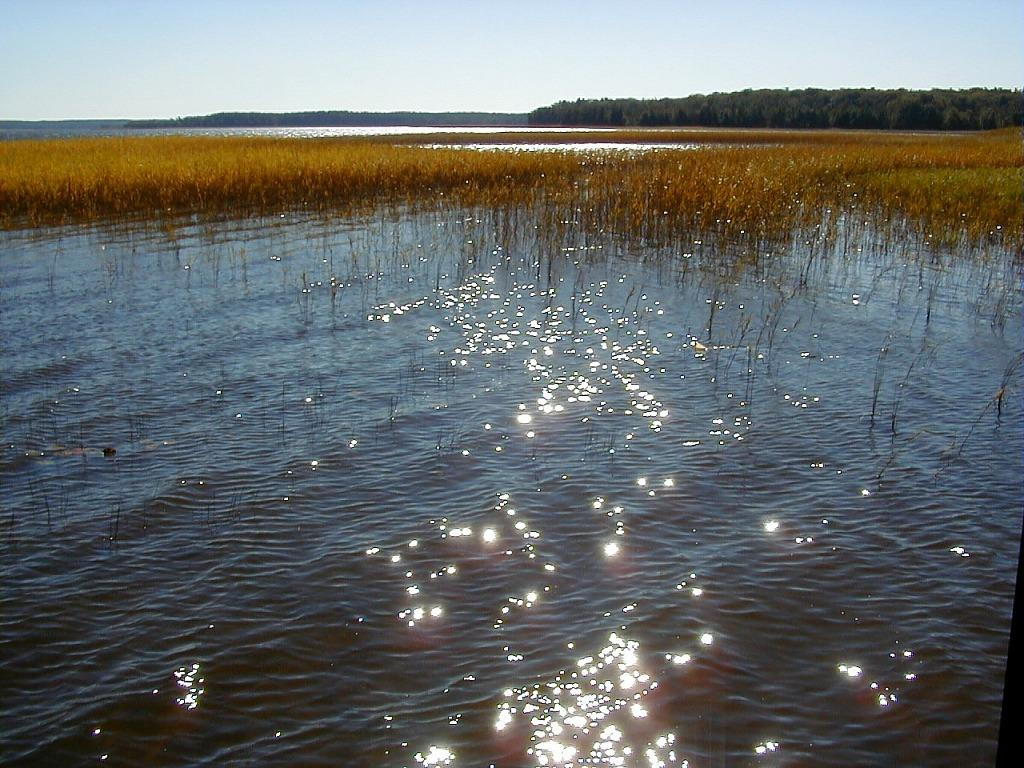
- Lake near Usma

- Location within Latvia
- Location: Latvia
- Coordinates: 57°11′35″N 22°07′47″E
- Area: 815 ha (2,010 acres)
- Established: 1912

Moricsala Nature Reserve (Latvian: Moricsalas dabas rezervāts) is a nature reserve in western Latvia (Courland). It is situated on two islands in Lake Usma and consists of boreal, mixed broad-leaf and oak old-growth forest as well as swamps. Founded in 1912, it is the oldest nature reserve in Latvia. Being a so-called strict nature reserve, entry into the reserve is prohibited except for scientific purposes. The nature reserve serves as a habitat for several rare species of moss, lichen and insects; for example, 222 species of butterflies can be found here. For some of these butterflies, the nature reserve is the only known habitat in the Baltic states.
