= Saka Parish =

Parish of Latvia

- parish of Latvia
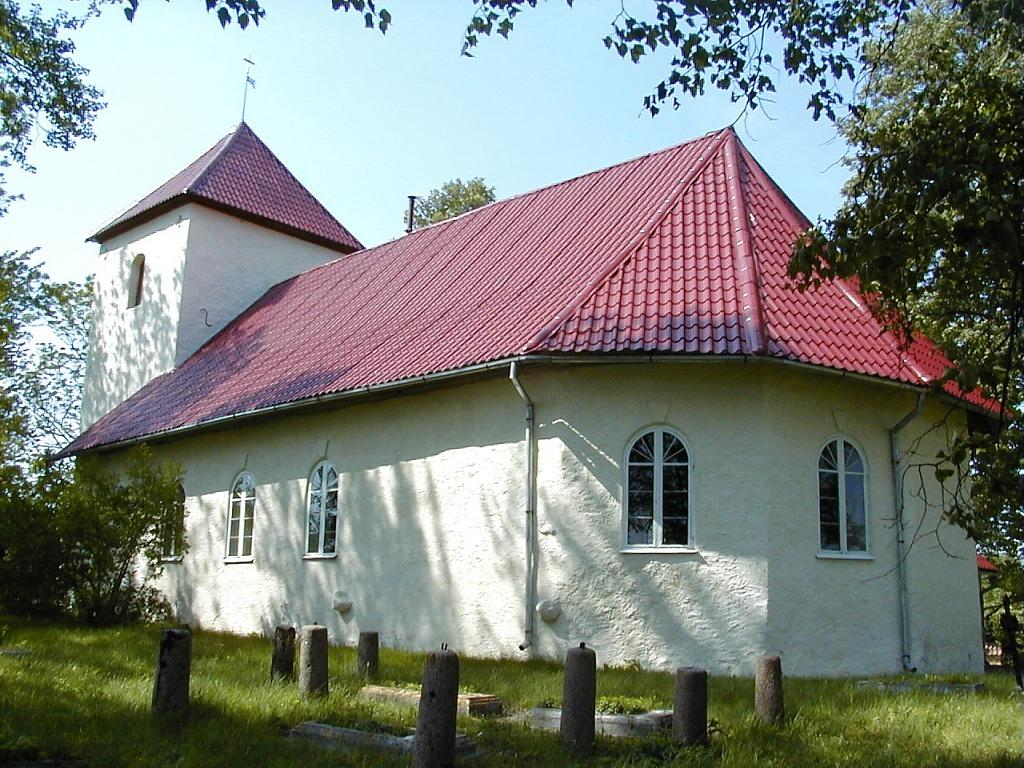

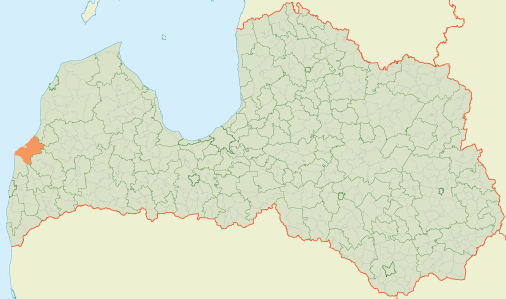
- 56°51′31″N 21°16′49″E

- Location within Latvia
- Country: Latvia

Area
  - Total: 318.15 km^{2} (122.84 sq mi)
  - Land: 308.79 km^{2} (119.22 sq mi)
  - Water: 9.36 km^{2} (3.61 sq mi)

Population (1 January 2026)
  - Total: 414
  - Density: 1.34/km^{2} (3.47/sq mi)

Saka Parish (Latvian: Sakas pagasts) is an administrative unit of South Kurzeme Municipality in the Courland region of Latvia. The parish has a population of 626 (as of 1/07/2010) and covers an area of 318.292 km^{2}.

== Villages of Saka parish ==
- Mežvidi
- Orgsaļiena
- Pievikas (Rīva)
- Saka
- Saliena
- Strante
- Ulmale
- Upsēde
