= Harwood Forest =

Coordinates: 55.2426°N 2.0063°W

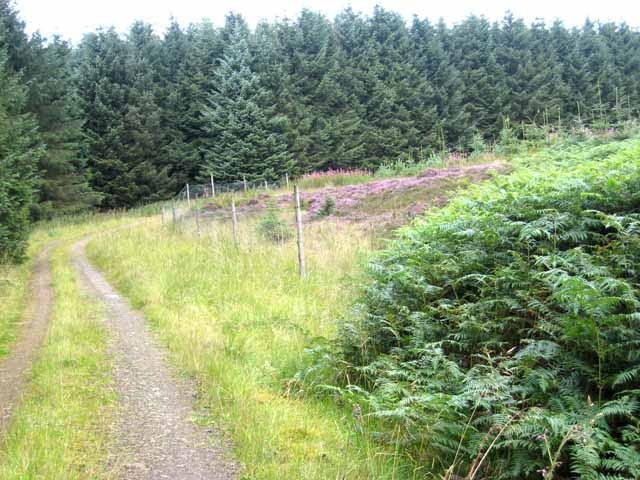
Light green bracken, dark green Sitka spruce, pink rosebay willowherb and purple heather in Harwood Forest.

Harwood Forest is a 3,527-hectare (8,720-acre) conifer plantation located to the south of Rothbury in North Northumberland, England, and managed by Forestry England.

The forest occupies moorland north of the east-west Morpeth to Elsdon road, west of the B6342, extending north to the Simonside Hills; it measures some eleven kilometres (6.8 mi) north-to-south and at its widest is seven kilometres (4.3 mi) east-to-west.

The initial impetus for its establishment was an offer made in 1929 by Sir Charles Trevelyan, 3rd Baronet to sell Harwood Farm to the commission at less than market rate. Trevelyan had inherited Wallington Hall and estate on the death of his father, the 2nd Baronet, in August 1928, and wished to see the estate forested; and although he determined on large-scale planting on other, retained, parts of the estate, he determined that it was reasonable to make arrangements with the commission to expedite his plan by transferring 1,536 acres (622 ha) to it. The farm forms the trapezoid southernmost section of the forest.

The next major acquisition was in 1950, when the Cragside estate of William Watson-Armstrong, 2nd Baron Armstrong, leased 525 acres (212 ha) to the commission, followed in 1951 by another 867 acres (351 ha), to form the Simonside section of the forest. This section is enclosed by the Simonside Hills, Simonside and Tosson Hill constraining the forest to a narrow neck-section, with additional forest to the north of Simonside.

In the same year, 1951, the County Borough of Tyneside leased Chartners, a 1,755-acre (710 ha) farm to the south of the Simonside section, which covered the high watershed of Fontburn Reservoir, to the commission. Subsequent additions to the forest include Redpath farm, which joined the previously isolated Harwood farm area to Chartners and the Simonside section.
