= Saka, Latvia =

Village in Latvia

Saka
- Village
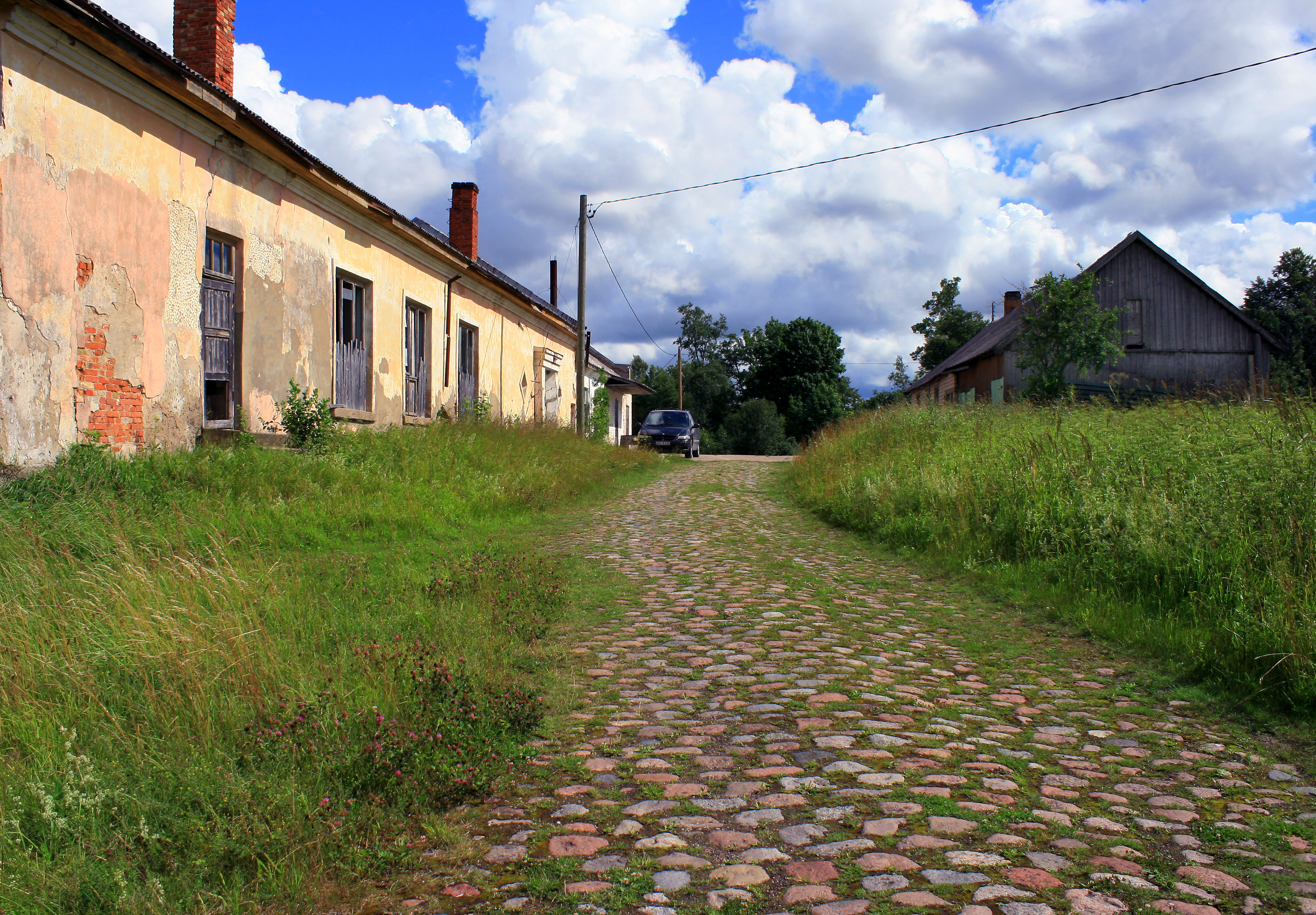
- Old road in Saka.

- Location within Latvia
- Country: Latvia
- Municipality: Pāvilosta
- Parish: Saka
- Elevation: 5 m (16 ft)

Population (2020)
  - Total: 30
- Post code: LV-2142

Saka (Latvian: Saka, until 1918 German: Sackenhausen) is a village in South Kurzeme Municipality in the Courland region of Latvia, the administrative center of Saka Parish. Located at the confluence of the rivers Durba and Tebra, forming the river Saka. The regional highway P111 (Ventspils — Grobiņa) passes nearby. The distance to the city Liepāja is about 52 km.

According to the data for 2017, 33 people lived in the settlement. There is a Parish administration, a library, a guest house, Lutheran and Baptist churches.

== History ==
According to written sources, the name "Saccze" or "Sacese" was first mentioned in 1230 in the documents of Course State. The settlement has formed on the former Sackenhausen estate. The construction of the castle may have started soon after 1386, when Courland bishop Otto acquired place owned by Arnold Lindal. It is believed that the bishop ordered the construction of a castle here to ensure uninterrupted traffic on the then navigable Tebre and to protect the mouth of the Saka River. In 1522 the castle came under the control of the Osten-Sacken family who ruled the castle until 1714. During the Second Northern War, the castle was destroyed in 1660 and has not been restored since. Later the nobility chapel was demolished in 1940 year.

In Soviet times, the village was the center of the Saki Village Council Liepāja district. The central estate of the Tsentiba collective farm was located in the village.
