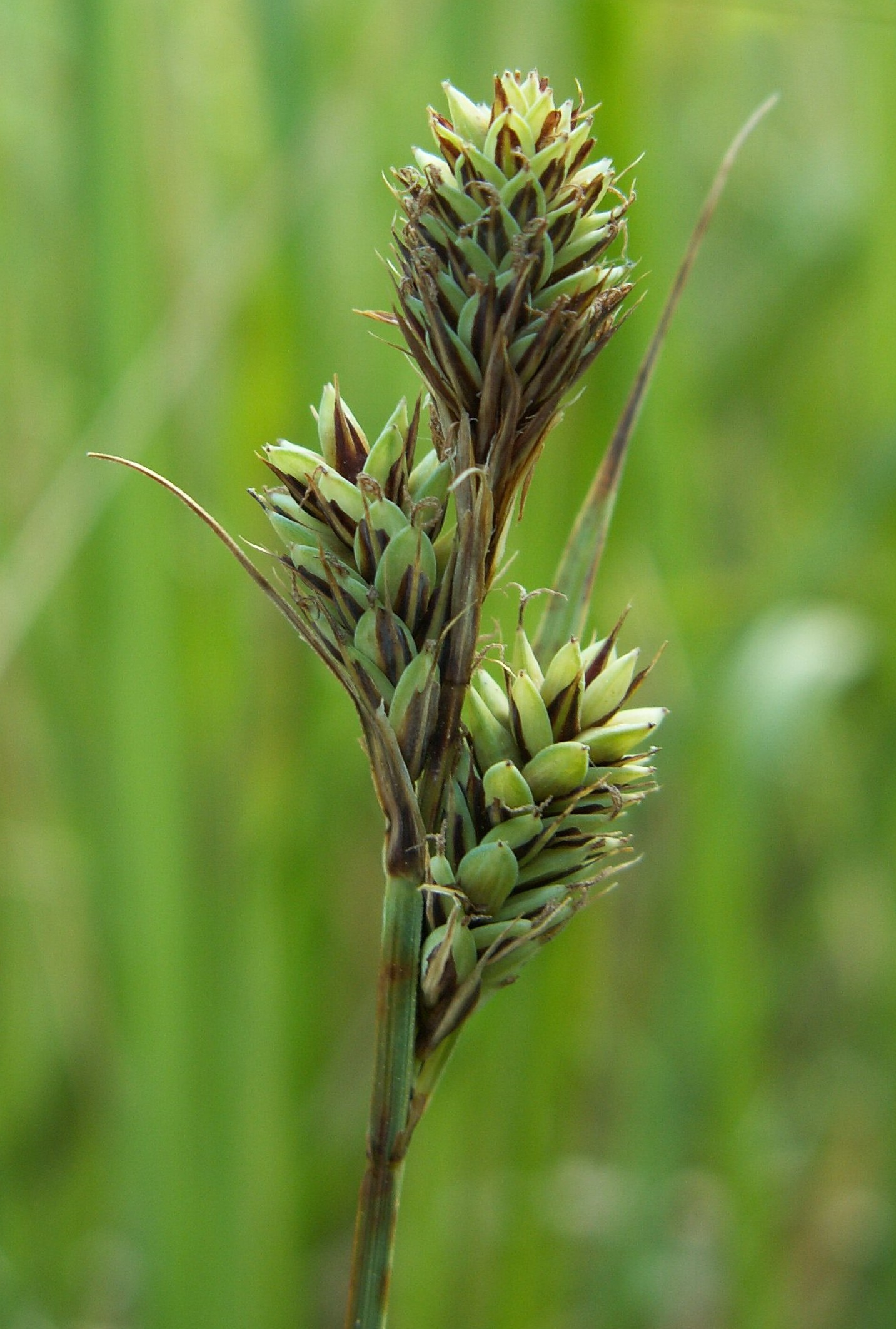

Conservation status
- Least Concern (IUCN 3.1)

Scientific classification
- Kingdom: Plantae
- Clade: Tracheophytes
- Clade: Angiosperms
- Clade: Monocots
- Clade: Commelinids
- Order: Poales
- Family: Cyperaceae
- Genus: Carex
- Section: Carex sect. Racemosae
- Species: C. buxbaumii

Binomial name
- Carex buxbaumii Wahlenb.

= Carex buxbaumii =

Species of grass-like plant

Carex buxbaumii is a species of sedge known as Buxbaum's sedge or club sedge. It is native to much of the northern Northern Hemisphere, from Alaska to Greenland to Eurasia, and including most of Canada and the United States. It grows in wet habitat, such as marshes and fens. This sedge grows in clumps from long rhizomes. The stems are 75–100 cm (30–39 in) in maximum height. The leaves are narrow and small. The inflorescence has a bract which is sometimes longer than the spikes. The fruits have dark-colored bracts and a sac called a perigynium or utricle which is gray-green and rough in texture.
