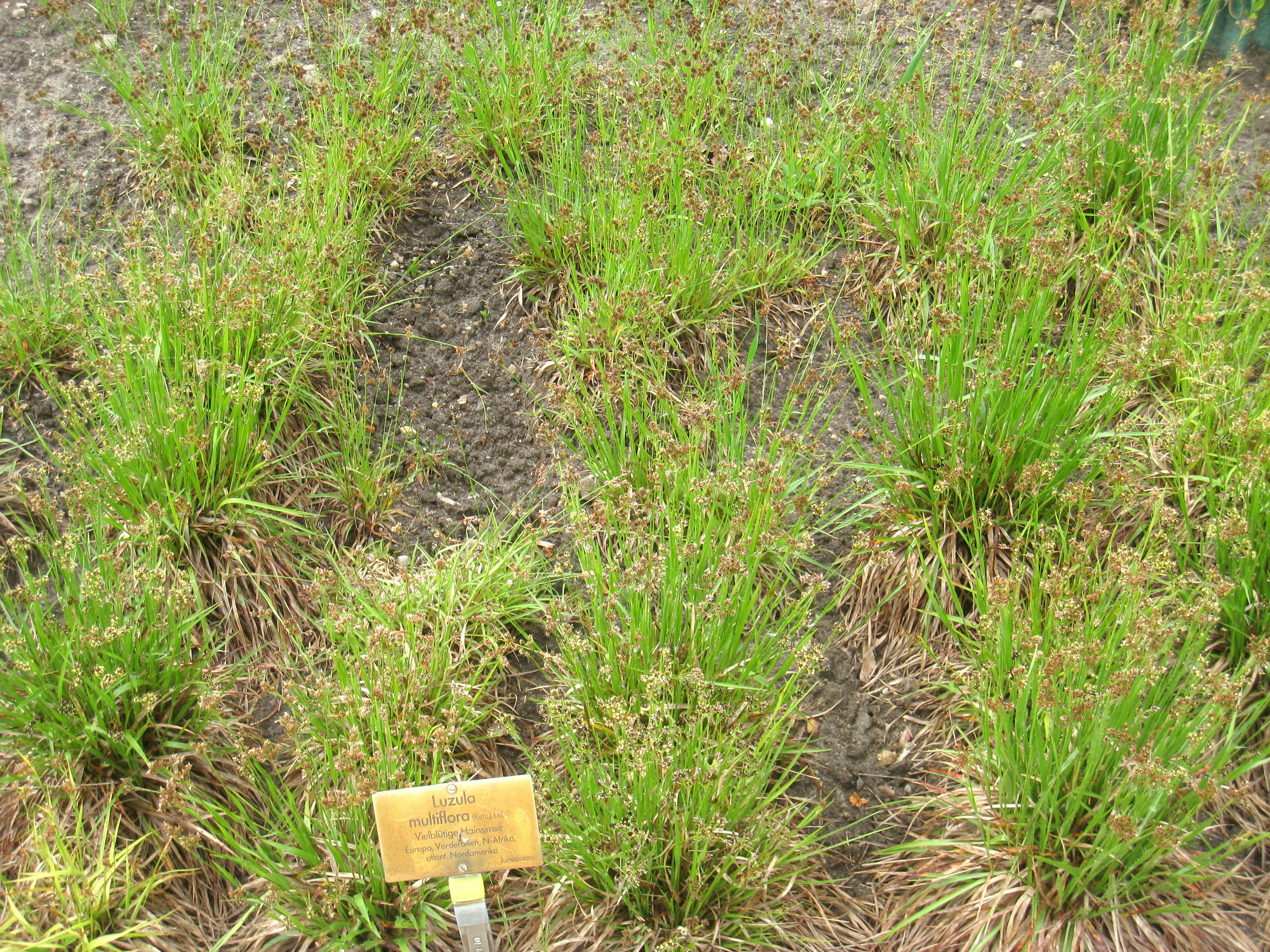

Scientific classification
- Kingdom: Plantae
- Clade: Embryophytes
- Clade: Tracheophytes
- Clade: Spermatophytes
- Clade: Angiosperms
- Clade: Monocots
- Clade: Commelinids
- Order: Poales
- Family: Juncaceae
- Genus: Luzula
- Species: L. multiflora

Binomial name
- Luzula multiflora (Ehrh.) Lej.

Synonyms
- Juncus campestris var. multiflorus Ehrh. (basionym); Juncus multiflorus (Ehrh.) Ehrh.

= Luzula multiflora =

Species of flowering plant in the rush family

Luzula multiflora, the common woodrush or heath wood-rush, is a species of flowering plant in the rush family.

It is native to Europe, eastern Asia, northern Africa, northern North America, including Canada, and in northern regions of the United States. The native status of common woodrush is under some debate. While Flora of North America list it as introduced, the more common opinion is it is a circumpolar species native in North America and in parts of Europe and Asia. The taxonomy of the wood rush complex involving several Luzula spp. has a history of instability. In the past, common woodrush was classified as a variety of a European species, or Luzula campestris multiflora. Both of these species of rush were then also lumped together with another similar species, Luzula echinata (hedgehog woodrush). As a result, Luzula multiflora and Luzula echinata are sometimes confused. Most of the many woodrushes that grow in North America are rather difficult to tell apart. In spite of the resemblance of rushes and woodrushes to grasses or sedges, they have the same number and arrangement of flower parts as lilies.

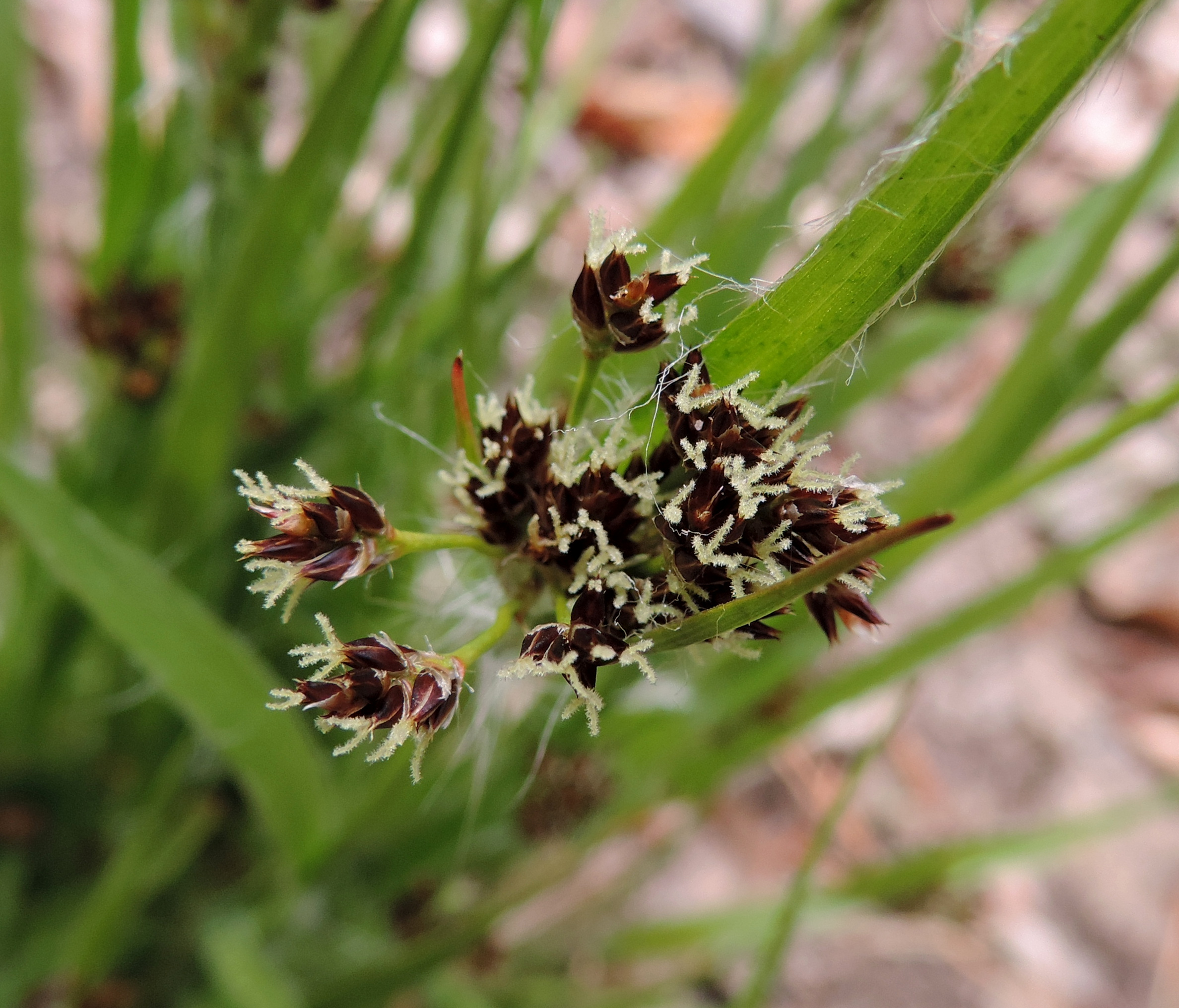
Flowers beginning to open, with stigmas protruding but tepals not yet open, in May near Gniewino, Poland

Common woodrush grows 10 to 40 cm (4 to 16 in) tall with basal leaves 3.5 to 12 cm (1 3/8 to 4 3/4 in) long and 2 to 6 mm (0.08 to 0.24 in) wide. The flowers have six brown to black tepals 2 to 4 mm (0.08 to 0.16 in) long.

Common woodrush is fairly easy to identify with its leaves fringed with long, white hairs (common for Luzula species) and the terminal, spike clusters of 6-parted flowers on variable length stalks, replaced by round capsules starting in late spring. Common woodrush leaves often turn reddish in response to stressful conditions

Luzula multiflora resembles a grass in its vegetative state, but its seeds and scaly tepals are similar to those of other species in the rush family (Juncaceae). It is also unusual in preferring upland woodland habitats, as most species in the rush family prefer habitats that are more wet and sunny. The habitat for common woodrush is anthropogenic (man-made or disturbed habitats), forest edges, forests, meadows and fields.
