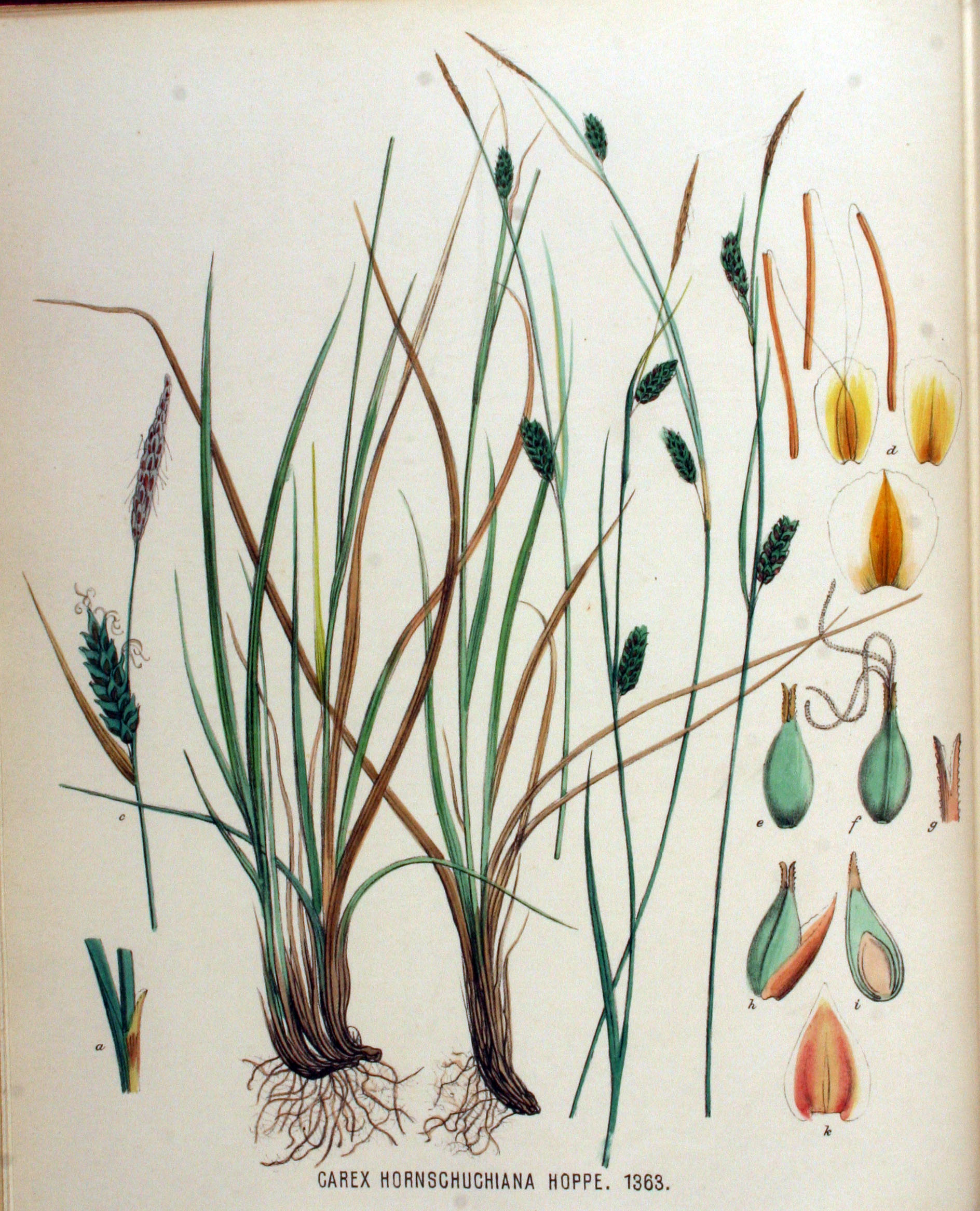
- Botanical illustration
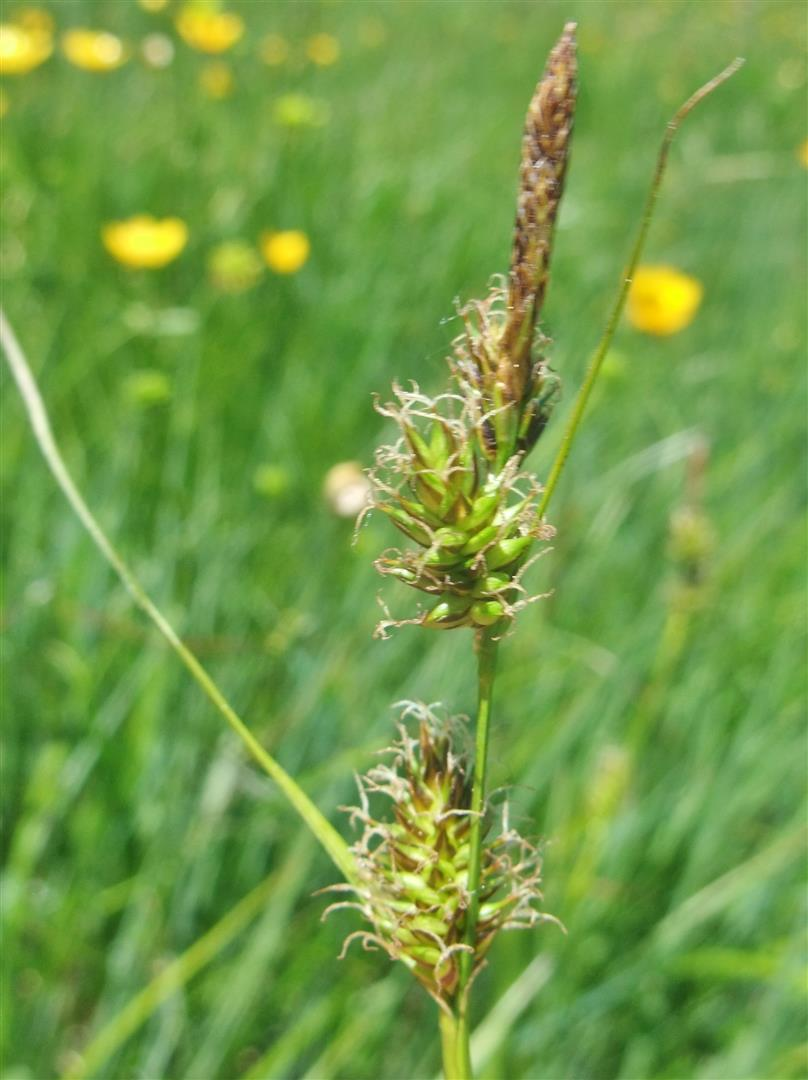
- Inflorescence

Scientific classification
- Kingdom: Plantae
- Clade: Tracheophytes
- Clade: Angiosperms
- Clade: Monocots
- Clade: Commelinids
- Order: Poales
- Family: Cyperaceae
- Genus: Carex
- Species: C. hostiana

Binomial name
- Carex hostiana DC.

Synonyms
- List: Carex armena Boiss.; Carex fulva Host; Carex fulvescens Mack.; Carex greeniana Dewey; Carex halophila Heuff.; Carex hornschuchiana Hoppe; Carex hornschuchiana var. laurentiana Fernald & Wiegand; Carex hostiana var. laurentiana (Fernald & Wiegand) Fernald & Wiegand; Carex speirostachya Sw. ex Sm.; Carex subsalsa Nyman; Carex trigona All.; Trasus fulvus Gray; Trasus hostianus (DC.) Gray

= Carex hostiana =

Species of flowering plant

Carex hostiana, the tawny sedge, is a species of flowering plant in the genus Carex, native to Europe and northeast Canada, and extinct in Massachusetts. It is a member of the Carex flava species complex.

== Description ==
The rhizomatous perennial sedge has a tufted habit and can be evergreen or deciduous It has straight culms with a triangular cross section that are 25 to 60 cm (9.8 to 23.6 in) in length. The linear shaped leaves sound on the flowering stems have a length up to 14 cm (5.5 in) and are 1.5 to 4.5 mm (0.059 to 0.177 in) wide. The inflorescences are found at the tip of the culm in the form of 5 to 70 mm (0.20 to 2.76 in) long spikes.

== Taxonomy ==
The species was first formally described by the botanist Augustin Pyramus de Candolle in 1813 as a part of the work Catalogus Plantarum Horti Botanici Monspeliensis. It has three homotypic synonyms; Carex fulva, Trasus fulvus and Trasus hostianus and 13 heterotypic synonyms including; Carex armena, Carex biformis, Carex fulvescens and Carex subsalsa.

== Distribution ==
In Europe the range of the species extends from Spain in the west to Ukraine in the east and from Italy and Greece in the south to as far north as Finland, Norway and Sweden. In the Americas it is found in Quebec and Newfoundland in Canada.

== See also ==
- List of Carex species
