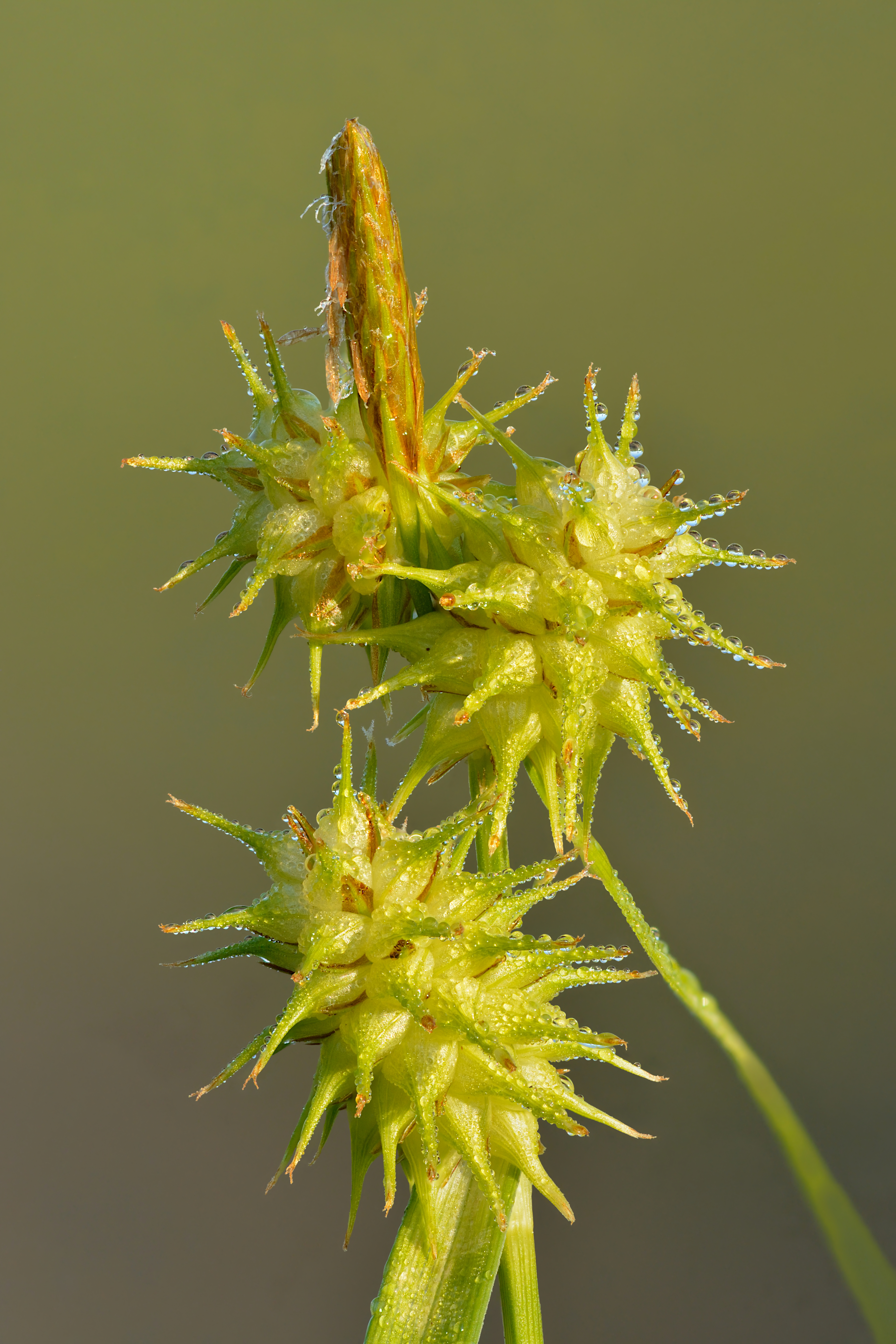
- Seedhead
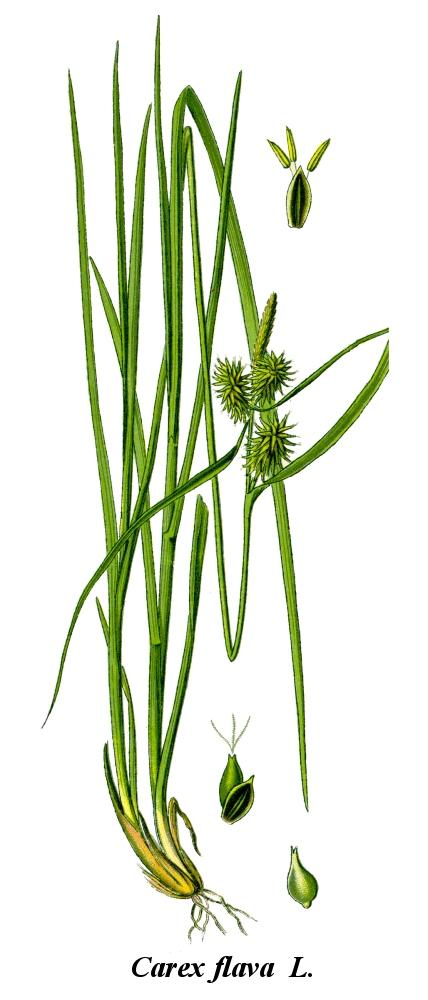
- Botanical illustration

Conservation status
- Least Concern (IUCN 3.1)

Scientific classification
- Kingdom: Plantae
- Clade: Tracheophytes
- Clade: Angiosperms
- Clade: Monocots
- Clade: Commelinids
- Order: Poales
- Family: Cyperaceae
- Genus: Carex
- Species: C. flava

Binomial name
- Carex flava L.

Synonyms
- List: Anithista flava (L.) Raf.; Carex echinata Lam.; Carex flava subsp. alpina (Kneuck.) O.Bolòs, Masalles & Vigo; Carex flava var. barrerae O.Bolòs, Masalles & Vigo; Carex flava var. fertilis Peck; Carex flava var. gaspensis Fernald; Carex flava var. graminis L.H.Bailey; Carex flava f. graminis (L.H.Bailey) Scoggan; Carex flava var. laxior (Kük.) Gleason; Carex flavella V.I.Krecz.; Carex flavofulva Beurl.; Carex foliosa All.; Carex laxior (Kük.) Mack.; Carex lepidocarpa var. laxior Kük.; Carex nevadensis subsp. alpina (Kneuck.) Podlech; Carex patula Host; Carex uetliaca Suter; Carex viridis Honck.; Proteocarpus flavus (L.) Fedde & J.Schust.; Trasus flavus (L.) Gray

= Carex flava =

Species of flowering plant

Carex flava, called hedgehog grass or large yellow sedge, is a widespread species of sedge (genus Carex, family Cyperaceae), native to the northern United States, Canada, Iceland, Europe, the Atlas Mountains in Africa, the Transcaucasus area, and parts of Siberia. It gives its name to the Carex flava species complex.

== Distribution and habitat ==
Carex flava favours calcareous mires and damp woodland conditions. It thrives on peaty soil flushed by calcareous water from adjacent limestone outcrops.
