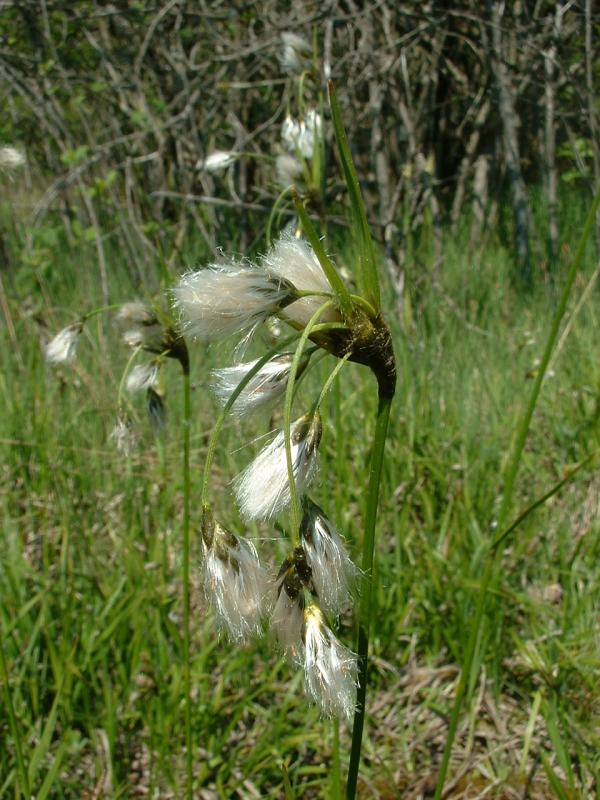

Scientific classification
- Kingdom: Plantae
- Clade: Embryophytes
- Clade: Tracheophytes
- Clade: Angiosperms
- Clade: Monocots
- Clade: Commelinids
- Order: Poales
- Family: Cyperaceae
- Genus: Eriophorum
- Species: E. latifolium

Binomial name
- Eriophorum latifolium Hoppe

= Eriophorum latifolium =

Species of grass-like plant

Eriophorum latifolium, commonly known as broad-leaved bog-cotton and broad-leaved cotton grass, is a species of flowering plant belonging to the family Cyperaceae.

== Taxonomy ==
Eriophorum latifolium was first described by the German pharmacist, botanist, entomologist and physician David Heinrich Hoppe in 1800.

== Distribution and habitat ==
Eriophorum latifolium is native to Europe. Some authorities report that its range extends into Asia as far as North Korea, while others claim it is strictly a European species not found east of the Urals.

== Bibliography ==
- Vrijdaghs, Alexander; Caris, Pieter; Goetghebeur, Paul; Smets, Eric (2005). "Floral ontogeny in Scirpus, Eriophorum and Dulichium (Cyperaceae), with special reference to the perianth". Annals of Botany. 95 (7): 1199–1209. doi:10.1093/aob/mci132. PMC 4246904. PMID 15788436.
- Novoselova, M. S. (1994). "Sistema roda Eriophorum (Cyperaceae): 1. Podrody Erioscirpus, Eriophoropsis, Phyllanthela" [The system of the genus Eriophorum (Cyperaceae): 1. Subgenera Erioscirpus, Eriophoropsis, Phyllanthela]. Botanicheskii Zhurnal. 79 (11): 77–89.
