= Pāvilosta =

Town in South Kurzeme Municipality, Latvia

- Town
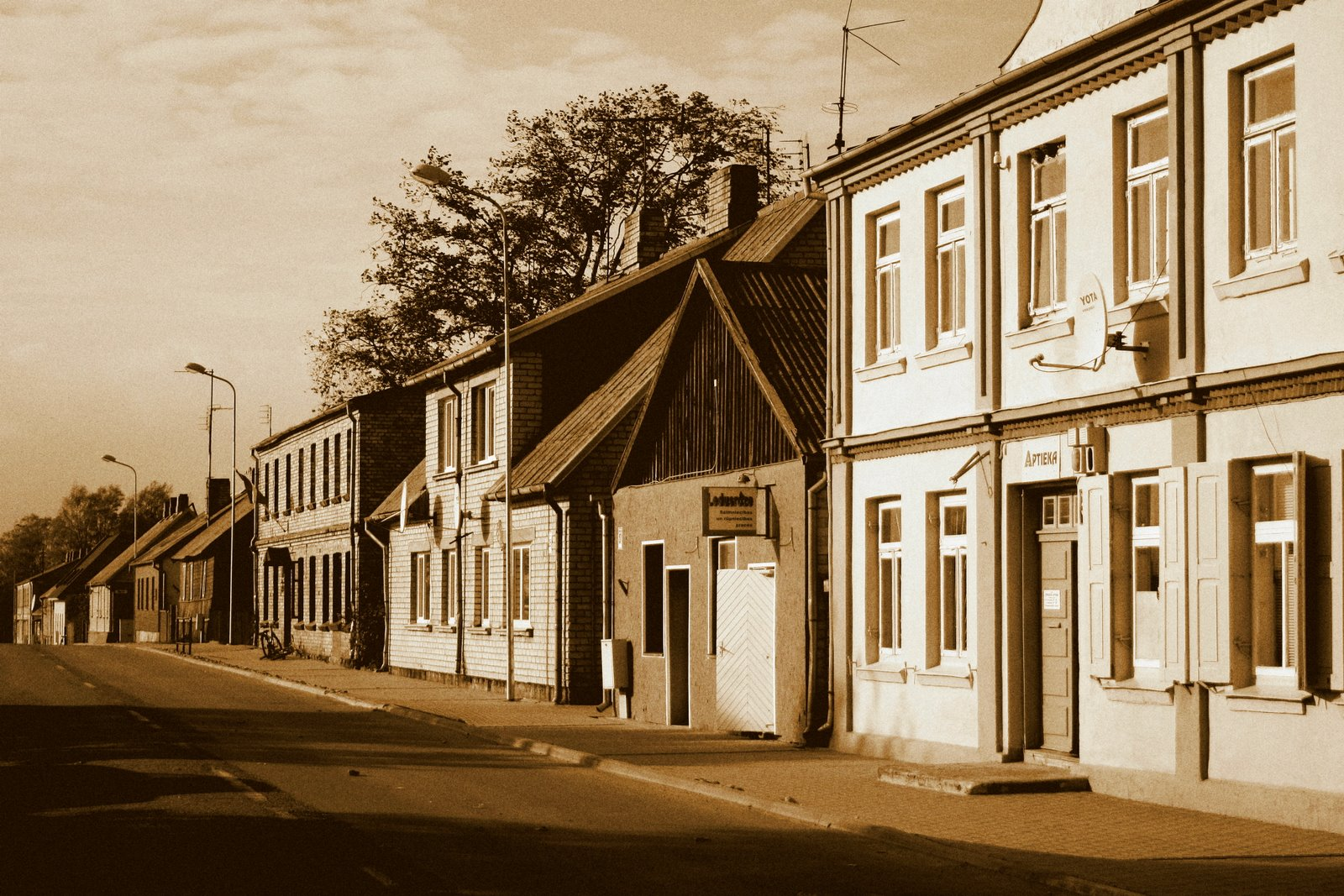
- Houses on Dzintaru Street (Dzintaru iela)

- Flag Coat of arms

- Location in Latvia
- Coordinates: 56°53′N 21°10′E
- Country: Latvia
- District: South Kurzeme Municipality
- Founded: 1879
- Town Rights: 1991

Area
  - Total: 6.34 km^{2} (2.45 sq mi)
  - Land: 6.04 km^{2} (2.33 sq mi)
  - Water: 0.3 km^{2} (0.12 sq mi)

Population (2026)
  - Total: 851
  - Density: 141/km^{2} (365/sq mi)
- Time zone: UTC+2 (EET)
  - Summer (DST): UTC+3 (EEST)
- Postal code: LV-3466
- Calling code: +371 634
- Climate: Cfb
- Website: https://www.pavilosta.lv/

Pāvilosta (German: Paulshafen) is a small port town in South Kurzeme Municipality in the Courland region of Latvia. It is located at the mouth of Saka river. The population in 2020 was 881.

== History ==
The territory of modern Pāvilosta has been inhabited since the Stone Age. During the late Iron Age and the Livonian crusade the territory was inhabited by Curonians and was part of the Piemare land. In 1253 in an agreement between Bishop of Courland and Livonian Order a port at the mouth of Saka river is mentioned for the first time. In the later years small port named Sackenhausen was part of the Bishopric of Courland, Duchy of Courland and Semigallia and since 1795 Russian Empire.

In 1879 local landlord from nearby Upesmuiža manor Otto Friedrich von Lilienfeld started extensive reconstruction works of the small port. The new port town was named Paulshafen, after baron's brother General governor of the Courland Governorate Paul von Lilienfeld. However, development of the town was not as quick as von Lilienfeld has planned. Many construction plots were available for rent but during ten years only ten buildings were built. The port was used only by several fishermen and three small sailboats owned by nearby manors.

The real development of the town started in 1893 when construction of the Liepāja military port (Karosta) started. Pāvilosta became the main hub for transporting stone to the Liepāja. The port was adjusted for stone shipment and many builders, workers and sailors came to the town. When stone shipments stopped, the town already had a good port and shipping infrastructure. Until First World War there were three shipyards in the town where small one mast ships were built. However several bigger two-mast schooners for international voyages also were built in the town. Overall 15 ships were built in the Pāvilosta. In 1913 Pāvilosta received limited town rights.

During the First World War Pāvilosta was occupied by the German Imperial Army and saw heavy destruction. Almost all of the Pāvilosta fleet was destroyed, sold or confiscated. After the war, only two motorboats and four sailors were left in port. In the Republic of Latvia the port shifted its focus from merchant ships to fishery. In 1930 a fishermen cooperative was established in the town. In 1939 a Lutheran church was consecrated in the town.

After the Soviet occupation of Latvia in 1940 all fishermen were forced to unite into an artel. During battles in the Courland Pocket several fishermen families fled from the Soviet re-occupation of Latvia in 1944 with motorboats to Gotland, only 150 kilometres to the west. After the war, Pāvilosta became a port town in the Latvian SSR. Local fishermen artel used motor boats until 1949 when the first fishing ship was bought. In 1951 the artel was transformed into fishermen kolkhoz Dzintarjūra (Amber sea). In 1975 the kolkhoz was merged with Liepāja fishermen kolkhoz Boļševiks (The Bolshevik). In the 1970s there were around 20 fishing trawlers in Pāvilosta port.

After 1991 Pāvilosta again became part of the Republic of Latvia. It was granted town rights in 1991. In 1994 stock company Pāvilosta was established who today owns two fishing trawlers. Today port is used mainly by local fishermen boats and tourist yachts. There is also sailing, surfing and windsurfing school in the town who owns several yachts.

== Climate ==
Pāvilosta has an continental climate (Köppen Dfb) closely bordering on a oceanic climate (Köppen Cfb).

Climate data for Pāvilosta (1991-2020 normals, extremes 1929-present)
Month	Jan	Feb	Mar	Apr	May	Jun	Jul	Aug	Sep	Oct	Nov	Dec	Year
Record high °C (°F)	9.4 (48.9)	14.7 (58.5)	18.7 (65.7)	27.3 (81.1)	30.2 (86.4)	33.7 (92.7)	33.4 (92.1)	35.9 (96.6)	30.5 (86.9)	22.4 (72.3)	15.9 (60.6)	11.7 (53.1)	35.9 (96.6)
Mean daily maximum °C (°F)	1.2 (34.2)	1.3 (34.3)	4.3 (39.7)	10.2 (50.4)	15.1 (59.2)	18.8 (65.8)	21.5 (70.7)	21.7 (71.1)	17.3 (63.1)	11.3 (52.3)	6.0 (42.8)	2.9 (37.2)	11.0 (51.7)
Daily mean °C (°F)	−0.9 (30.4)	−1.2 (29.8)	1.2 (34.2)	5.6 (42.1)	10.3 (50.5)	14.3 (57.7)	17.3 (63.1)	17.2 (63.0)	13.2 (55.8)	8.2 (46.8)	3.9 (39.0)	1.0 (33.8)	7.5 (45.5)
Mean daily minimum °C (°F)	−3.5 (25.7)	−4.0 (24.8)	−2.2 (28.0)	1.3 (34.3)	5.4 (41.7)	9.7 (49.5)	12.7 (54.9)	12.5 (54.5)	9.1 (48.4)	4.8 (40.6)	1.5 (34.7)	−1.4 (29.5)	3.8 (38.9)
Record low °C (°F)	−32.0 (−25.6)	−34.1 (−29.4)	−23.1 (−9.6)	−12.2 (10.0)	−4.6 (23.7)	−1.2 (29.8)	2.1 (35.8)	1.7 (35.1)	−4.0 (24.8)	−9.5 (14.9)	−16.1 (3.0)	−25.7 (−14.3)	−34.1 (−29.4)
Average precipitation mm (inches)	57.3 (2.26)	46.7 (1.84)	39.3 (1.55)	31.6 (1.24)	36.2 (1.43)	50.8 (2.00)	61.5 (2.42)	80.6 (3.17)	68.8 (2.71)	91.1 (3.59)	79.0 (3.11)	72.0 (2.83)	714.9 (28.15)
Average precipitation days (≥ 1 mm)	12	9	8	7	7	8	8	10	10	13	13	14	119
Average relative humidity (%)	86.7	85.3	81.3	77.1	76.7	78.9	80.0	79.4	80.8	82.8	86.8	86.9	81.9
Source 1: LVĢMC
Source 2: NOAA (precipitation days, humidity 1991-2020)

== Gallery ==
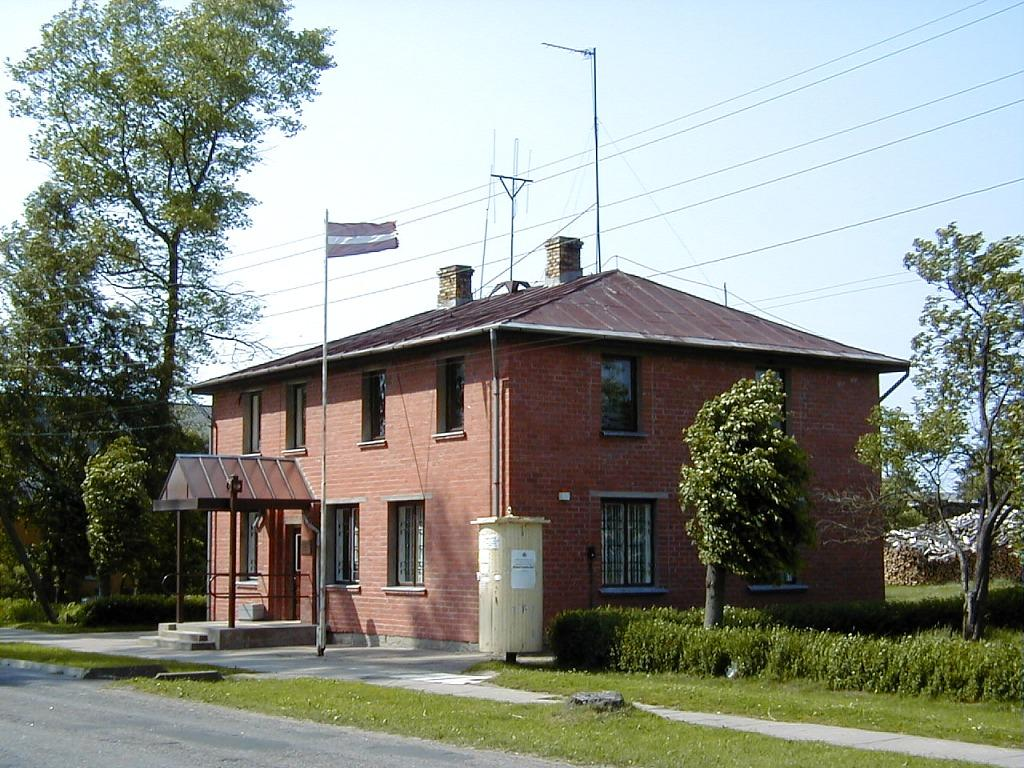
Pāvilosta City Council

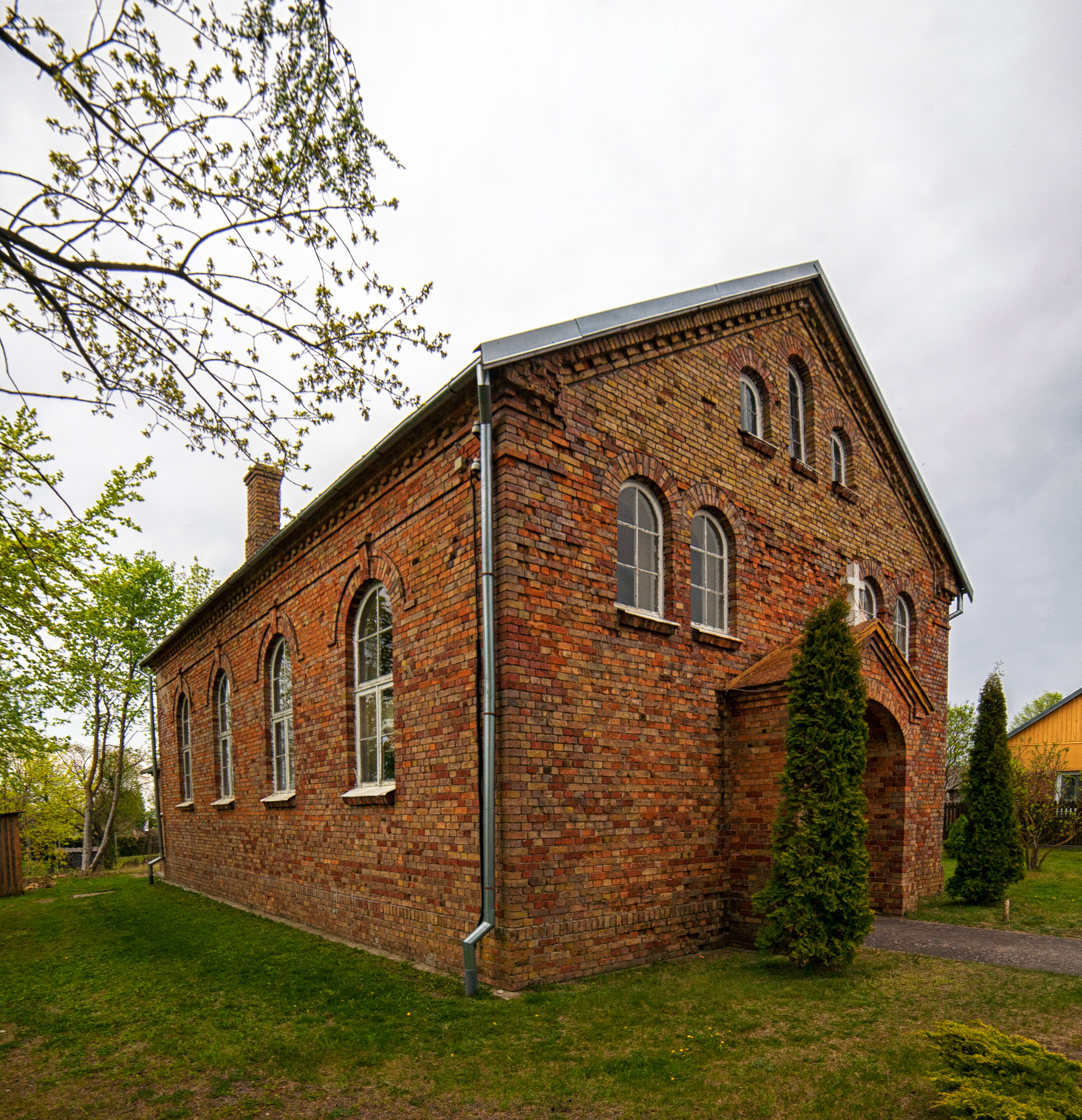
Pāvilosta Lutheran church

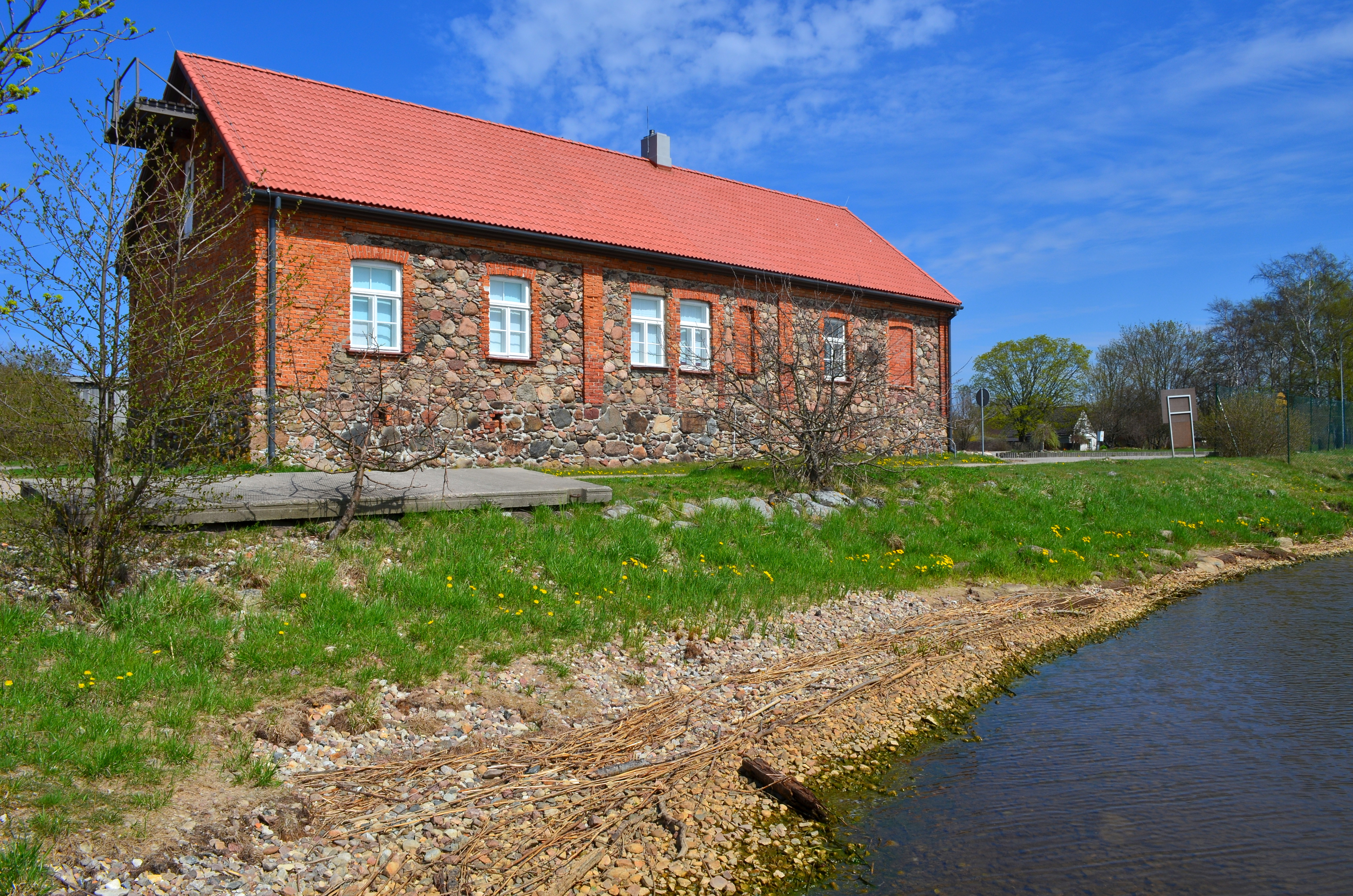
Pāvilosta Local History Museum. The oldest building in the town

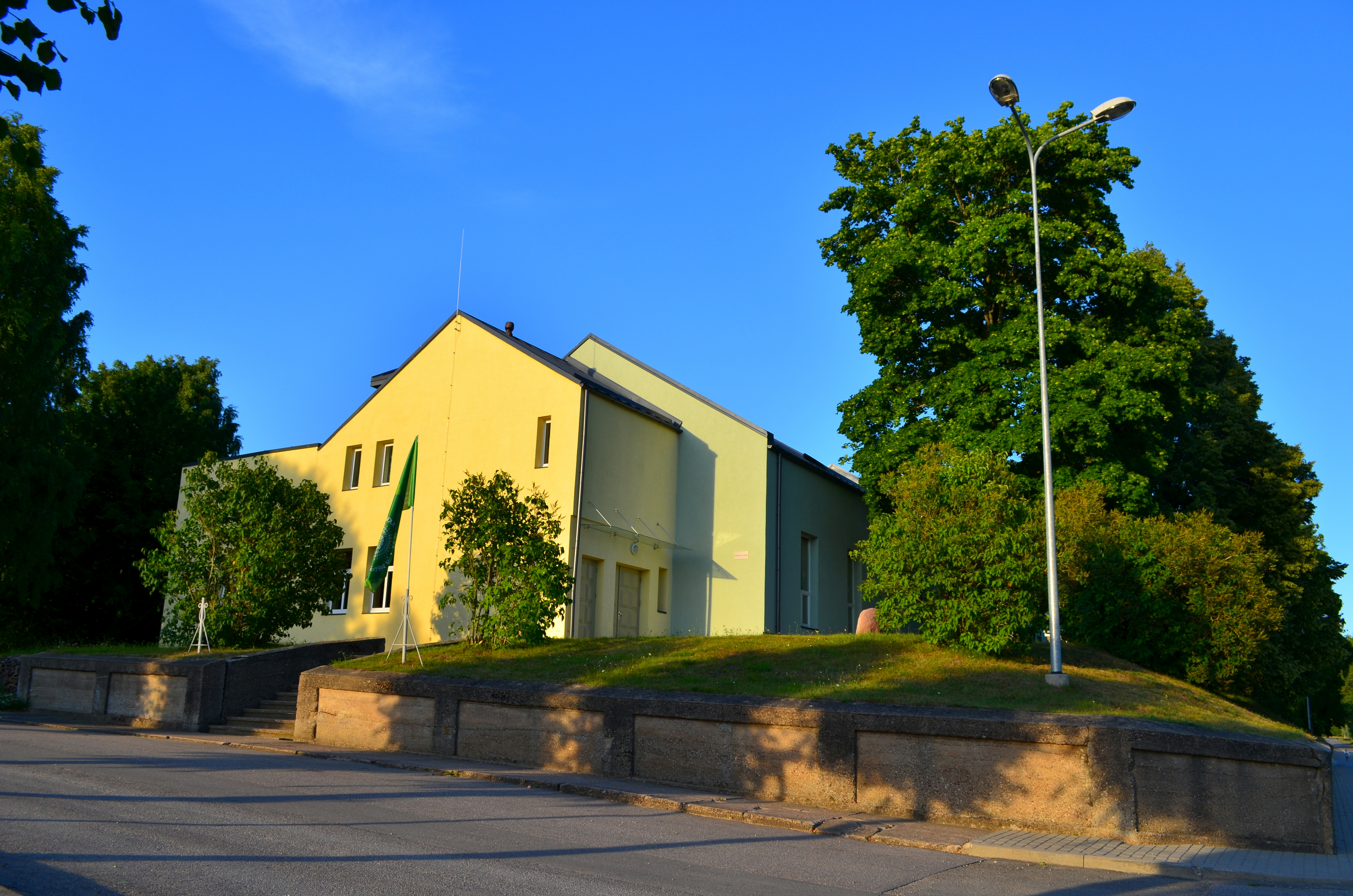
Pāvilosta Culture House

== See also ==
- List of cities and towns in Latvia
