= Lake Brinzio =

Small lake in Brinzio, Varese, Italy

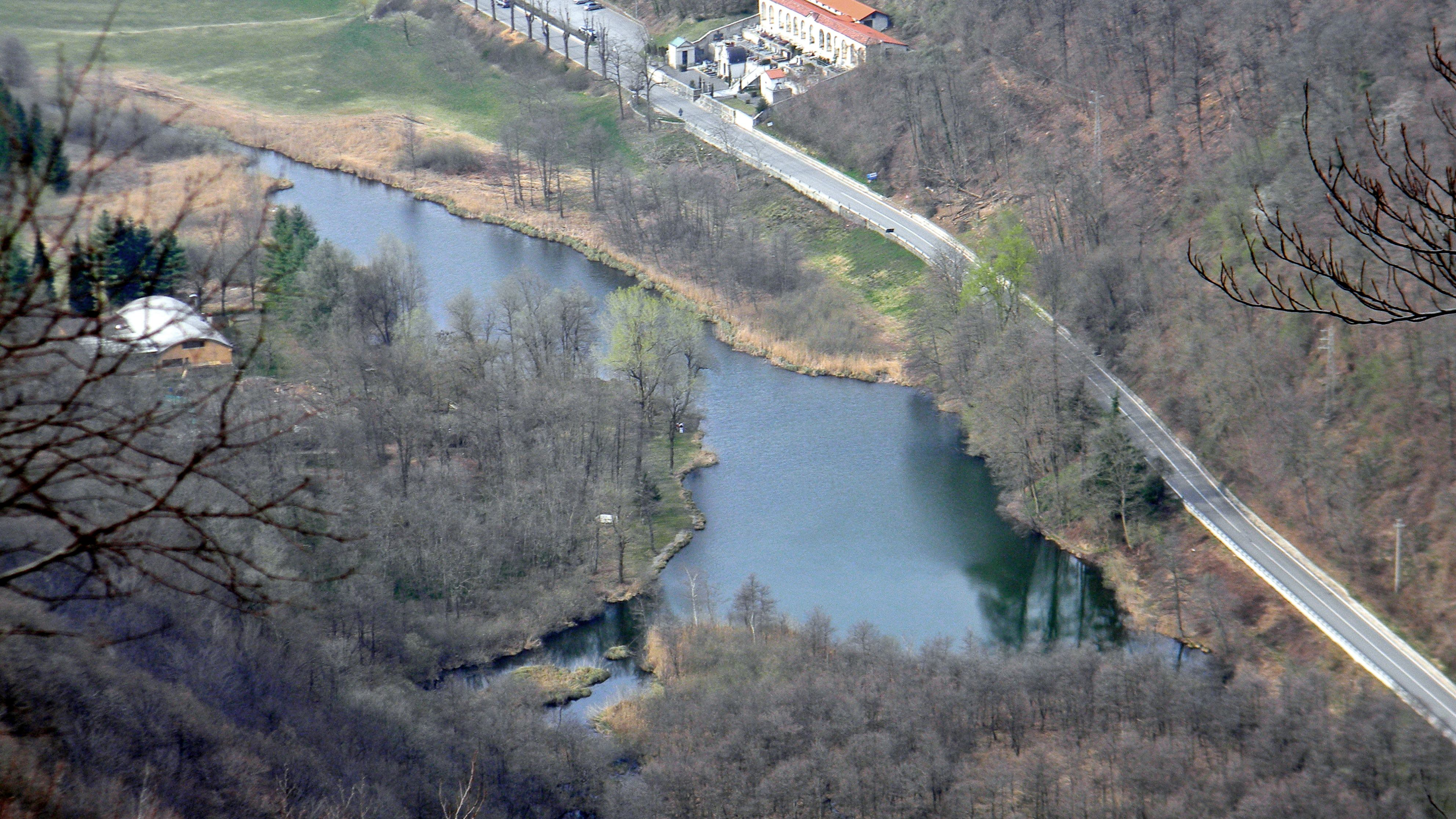
- Aerial view of Lake Brinzio
- Interactive map of Lake Brinzio
- Location: Brinzio, Province of Varese, Lombardy, Italy
- Coordinates: 45°53′07″N 8°47′41″E
- Type: Pond, small lake
- Primary inflows: Intrino, Brinzio River, Buragona
- Primary outflows: Brivola River
- Surface area: 015 km^{2} (5.8 sq mi)
- Max. depth: 35 m (115 ft)
- Surface elevation: 510 m (1,670 ft)

Lake Brinzio, also known as Pond Brinzio, is a small Italian lake located in the eastern part of the Brinzio municipality, in the province of Varese, Lombardy, northern Italy. It is situated at an elevation of approximately 510 metres (1,673 feet) above sea level. The lake has an average depth of 3.5 metres (11 feet) and covers a surface area of about 1.5 hectares (3.7 acres).

== Geography ==
Lake Brinzio is included within an oriented nature reserve established in 1984 and managed by the Campo dei Fiori Regional Park. The reserve encompasses an area of approximately 20 hectares (49 acres). The lake is fed by several tributary streams, including the Rio di Brinzio and Buragona (from the east), and the Intrino (from the south). Additionally, underwater springs located in the eastern part of the basin contribute to its inflow. The lake's sole outflow is the Brivola stream, which exits to the west and flows for less than one kilometre before joining the Valmolina stream near the southern edge of the Brinzio settlement.

The lakebed consists primarily of silt, deposited through the action of inflowing streams. Surrounding the lake is an area of more than 10 hectares (25 acres) characterized by marshland, which contributes to the local biodiversity. Due to environmental protection regulations, activities such as swimming and boating are prohibited.

== History ==
The history of Lake Brinzio is relatively recent in comparison to the major lakes of Lombardy. In the early 20th century, the lake's origin was commonly believed to be the result of water filling an extinct volcanic crater. This theory was considered plausible due to the presence of ancient volcanic activity in the Mount Martica area. However, subsequent advances in geological research have since refuted this hypothesis, confirming that Lake Brinzio is of glacial-moraine origin.

Prior to the Pleistocene glaciations, the Motta Rossa hill did not exist, and the valley between the present-day villages of Brinzio and Rasa featured a uniformly southward slope, shaped by the course of the Olona River. During the Pleistocene epoch, repeated advances of Alpine glaciers filled many of the pre-Alpine valleys—including Valcuvia and the Brinzio basin—with ice up to 900–1,000 metres thick. In some areas, only the highest peaks, such as Mount Campo dei Fiori, Mount Martica, Mount San Martino, and Mount Nudo, remained exposed above the glacial mass, protruding like islands above a frozen expanse.

The last glacial advance, known as the Würm glaciation, reached its maximum extent approximately 18,000 years ago. Although less extensive than previous advances, the Verbano glacier once again extended into the Brinzio valley and the basin of the Intrino stream, transporting large amounts of debris from the Alpine interior.

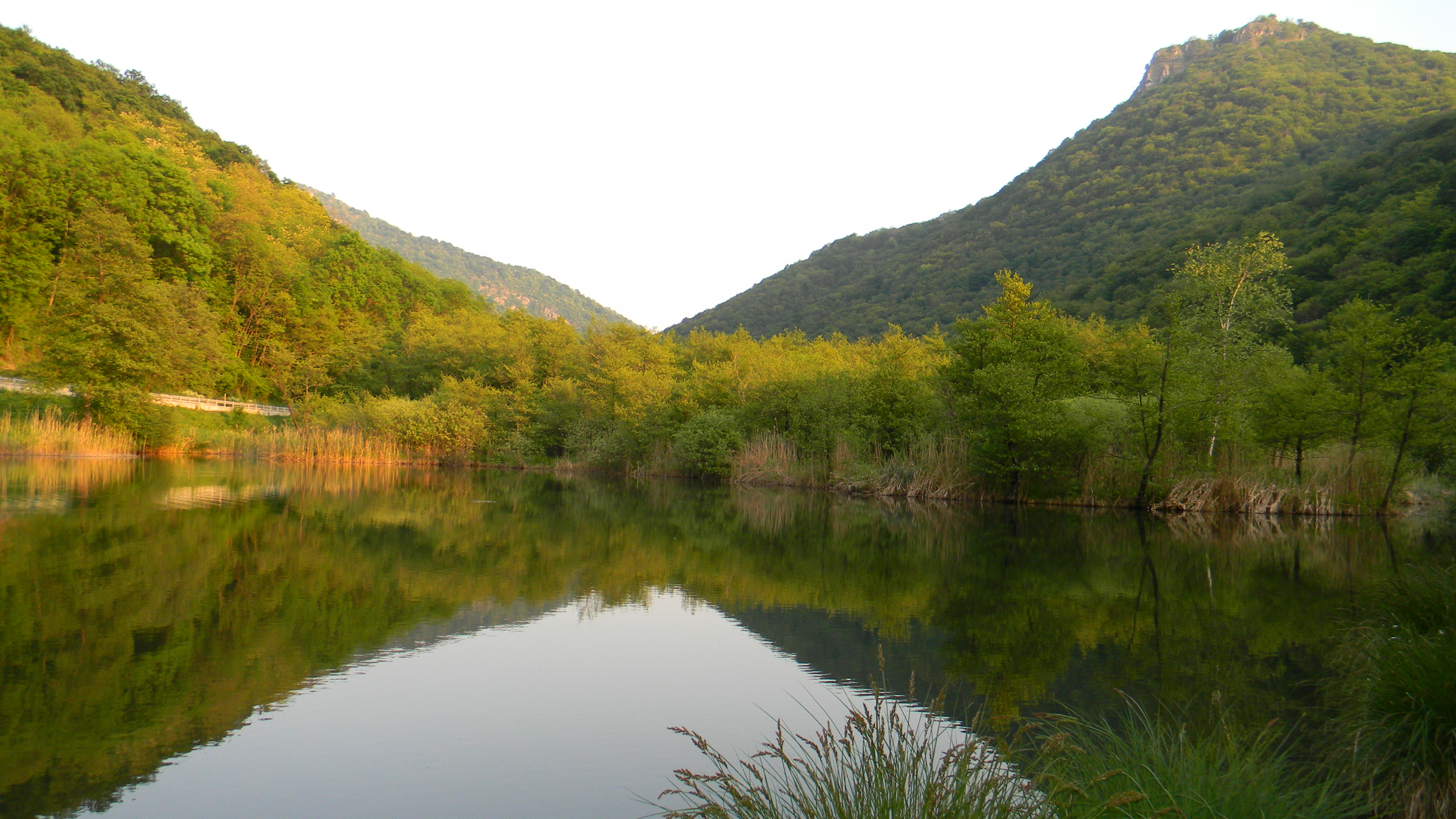
A glimpse of Lake Brinzio towards the Motta Rossa Pass; in the background are the Martica massif (left) and Mt. Legnone (right).

As the glacier retreated, it deposited this material along its path. At the Motta Rossa pass, these deposits formed a prominent moraine—an elongated accumulation of glacial debris—clearly visible along the slopes of Mount Legnone. This formation obstructed the natural southward flow of water, creating a watershed divide that separated the Olona River basin from the hydrological system of Valcuvia, which includes the Rio di Brinzio, Buragona, and Brivola streams.

Simultaneously, the glacier left behind substantial deposits of crushed stone, debris, and erratic boulders in the Intrino stream valley. These glacial remnants remain visible along the wooded trails between Brinzio, the Varrò Pass, and Mount Legnone. In the post-glacial period, before vegetation could stabilize the terrain, water erosion was significant. Streams such as the Intrino, descending from the northern slopes of Mount Campo dei Fiori, carried large quantities of sediment that accumulated at the base of the slopes, forming alluvial fans or dejection cones. These are still evident today as grassy mounds south of Brinzio, on which a Nordic ski trail has been established.

Over time, especially during flood events, sediment accumulation partially obstructed the Brivola stream, narrowing its channel. This obstruction led to the formation of a small body of water, giving rise to what is now Lake Brinzio.

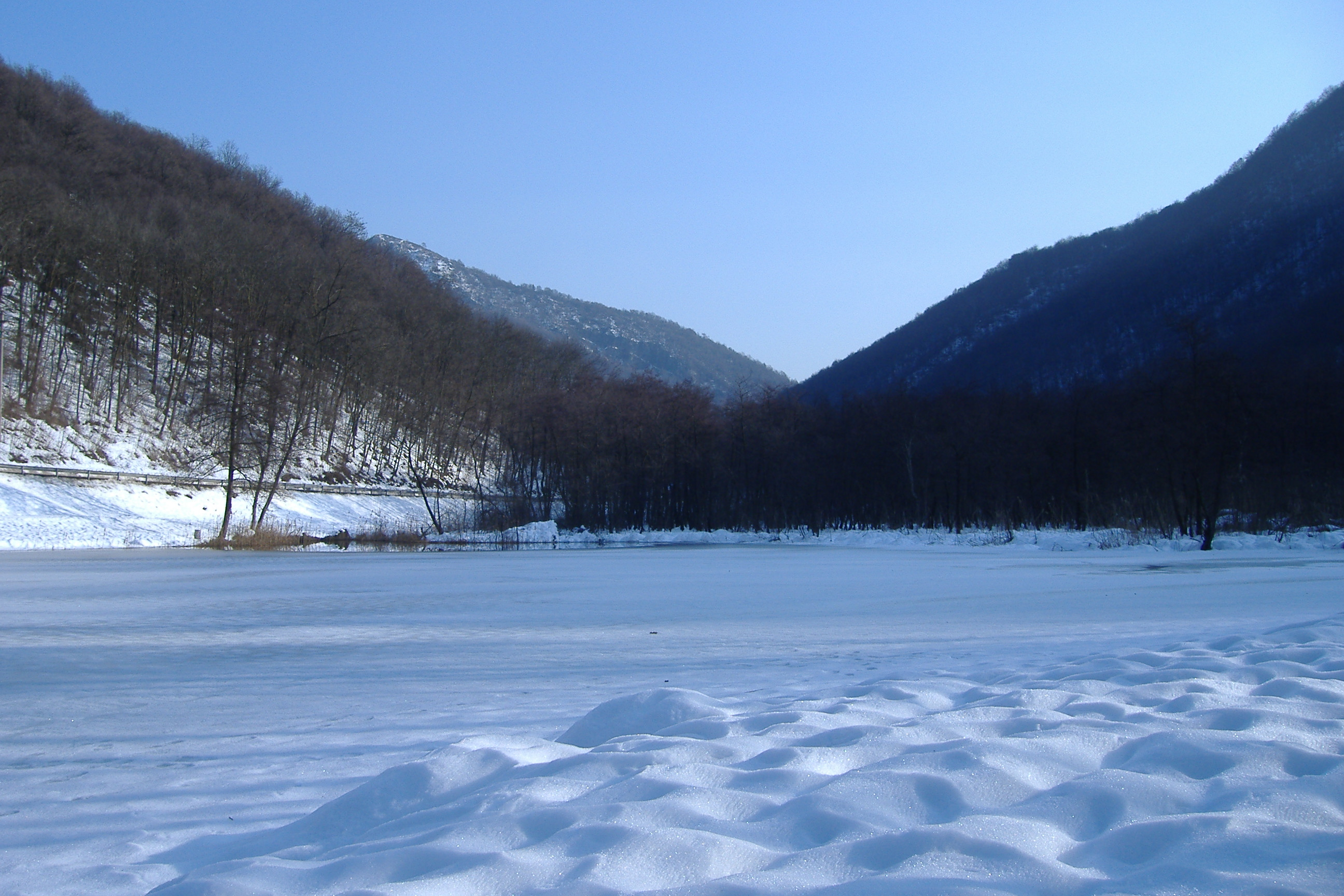
Lake Brinzio frozen.

Until the 19th century, Lake Brinzio was fed exclusively by the Rio di Brinzio, the Buragona stream, and several underwater springs within the basin. However, water input was highly variable, and even short periods of drought often caused significant drops in water level. In order to ensure a more consistent water supply and to protect the nearby town and agricultural areas from flooding, the course of the Intrino stream was diverted in the mid-19th century. Previously, the Intrino had joined the Brivola stream near the bridge by the public washhouse.

Engineer Giuseppe Quaglia, in his 1884 publication Laghi e torbie del circondario di Varese, referred to the lake as the “Brinzio pond” and observed that, over a span of twenty years, the water body had more than halved in size. He predicted that the lake would eventually fill in completely due to sedimentation from its tributaries. At the time, Quaglia supported this prospect, describing the lake as “fruitless” and a source of “noxious miasmas and unhealthiness.” He advocated for its drainage and transformation into a channel for spring and rainwater, arguing that efforts and resources should be devoted to eliminating the perceived health hazard.

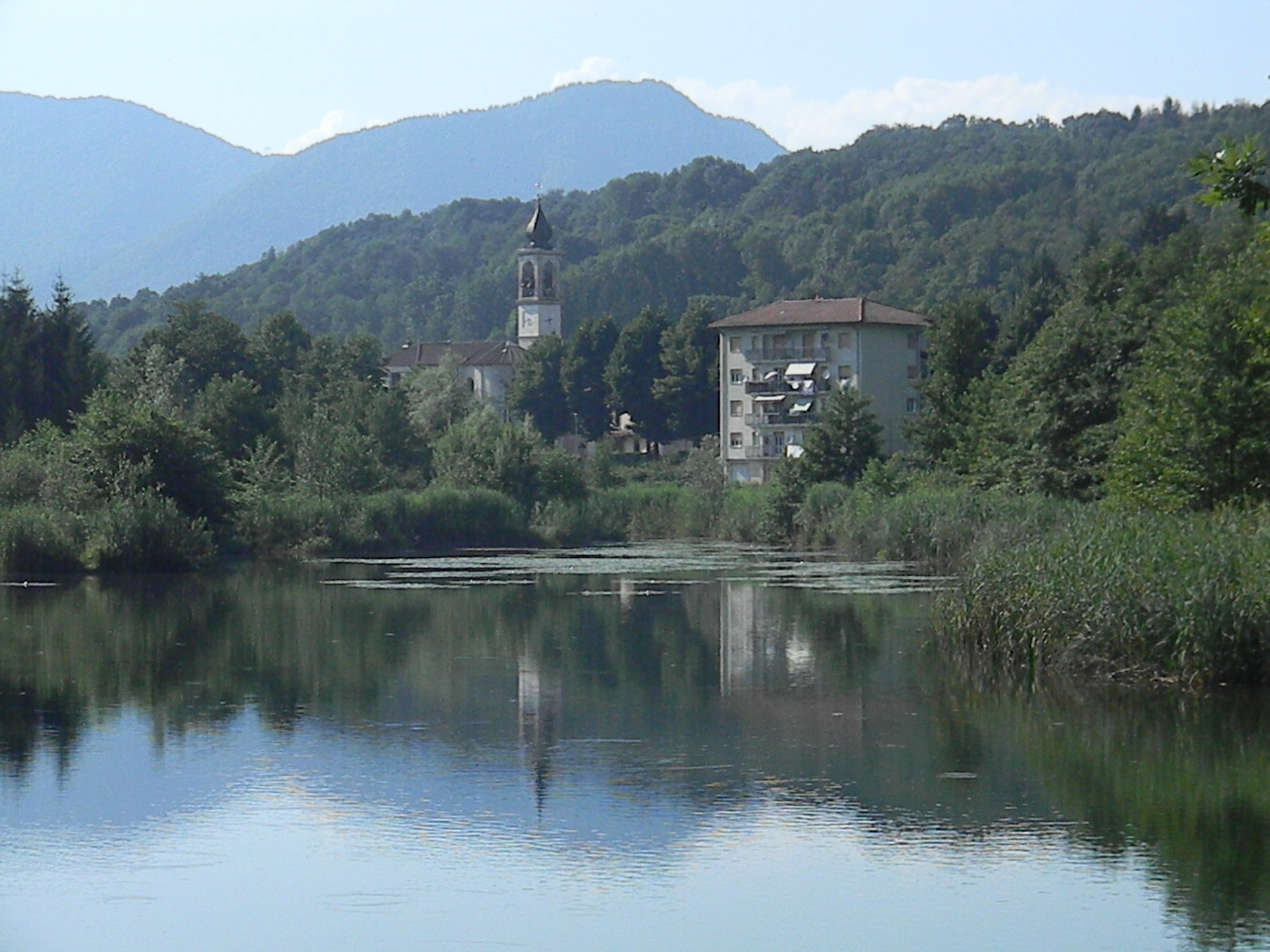
Brinzio church as seen from the lake.

During the 20th century, perspectives on Lake Brinzio shifted, and it came to be appreciated for its scenic and ecological value. Nonetheless, environmental pressures increased, particularly following the opening of a porphyry quarry on Mount Martica. Quarrying activities—including vegetation clearance, soil removal, and exposure of bare rock—intensified sediment transport in the Rio di Brinzio, accelerating the lake’s natural silting process. To address this issue, the quarry concessionaire constructed sedimentation basins in the lower part of the excavation site during the late 1990s to reduce the downstream movement of debris.

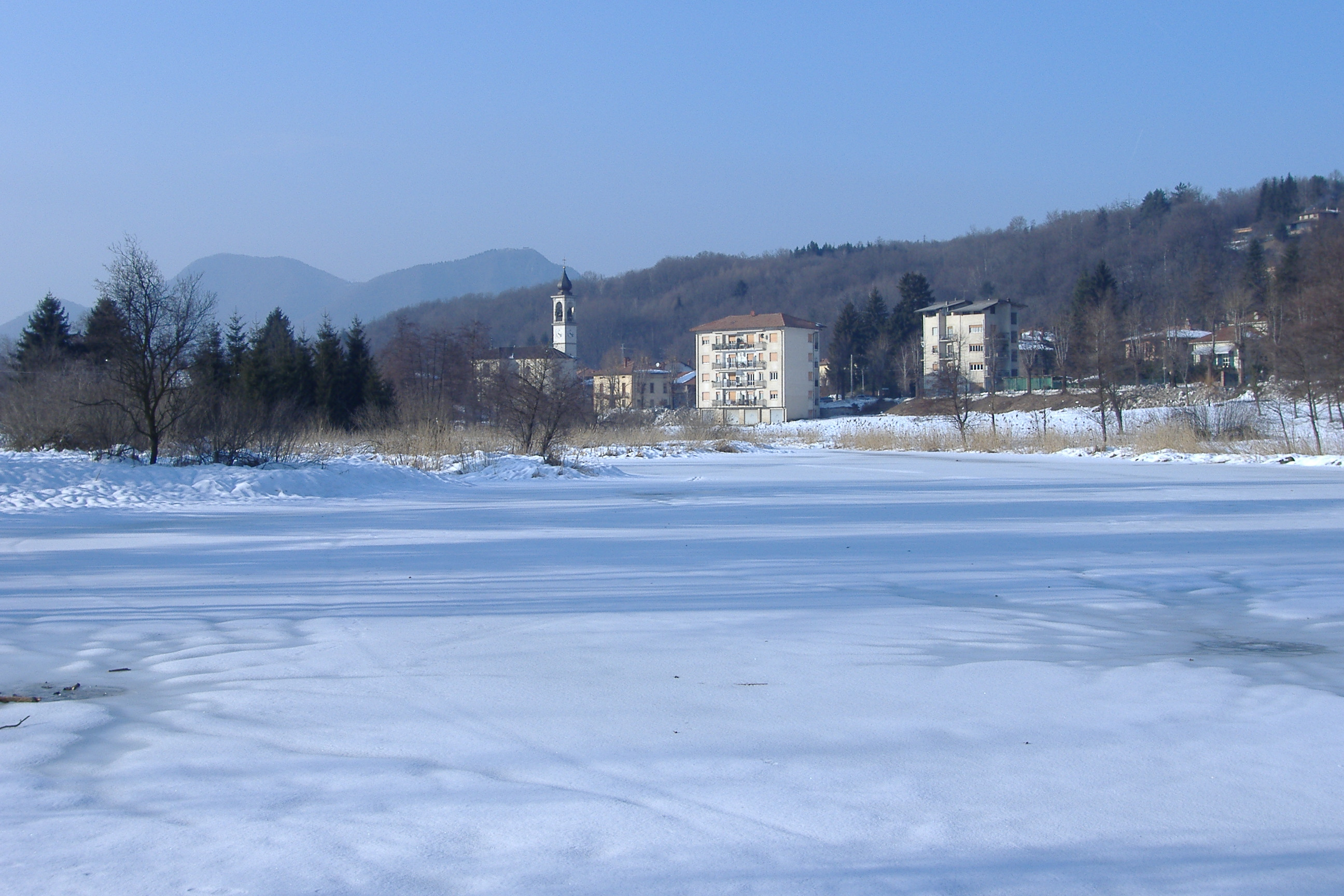
Panorama toward the town on the frozen lake.

By the late 1970s, the lake had stabilized in terms of shape, with a maximum depth of approximately 4 metres. However, sedimentation continued to progress rapidly in the final decades of the 20th century. A dredging operation was undertaken in the mid-1990s, but its effects proved insufficient. From 1990 onward, the phenomenon intensified, partly due to increasingly frequent and intense rainfall events. A bathymetric survey conducted in 2003 revealed that the downstream sector of the lake had a maximum depth of just 70 centimetres. An islet had formed at the mouth of the Intrino, and aquatic vegetation had proliferated across the basin.

In response, a major environmental intervention was carried out in 2004. This included dredging the lake basin to restore a maximum depth of one metre, reducing the density of aquatic vegetation, and deepening the Brivola stream bed for a length of 300 metres downstream. In addition, a series of naturalistic engineering measures, such as sediment traps, vegetated filters, and artificial rapids, were implemented in the Intrino valley to stabilize landslide-prone areas, limit bank erosion, and reduce sediment inflow into the lake during flood events.

Despite these efforts, silting resumed in the 2020s, as intense rainfall events once again increased the sediment load carried by watercourses in the Brinzio basin. As a result, the lake waters became turbid, and new islets formed at the mouth of the Intrino stream.

== Environmental data ==
=== Climate ===
The climate of the Lake Brinzio area is continental, characterized by cold winters and mild summers. Minimum temperatures in winter can fall as low as −10 °C, while summer maximums rarely exceed 25 °C.

=== Flora ===
The vegetation surrounding Lake Brinzio is representative of mid-mountain lacustrine ecosystems. Botanical surveys conducted between 1996 and 1998 recorded 181 species of vascular plants within the lake basin, including protected species such as Lilium martagon, Anemone nemorosa, Hepatica nobilis, Typha latifolia, Nymphaea alba, Iris pseudoacorus, and Iris graminea. Other noteworthy species include rare taxa within the Campo dei Fiori Park territory (e.g.,Thelypteris palustris, Allium angulosum, Carex appropinquata), species in regression (Valeriana dioica, Senecio aquaticus), and species more typical of higher altitudes (Alnus incana, Epilobium angustifolium).

There are eight vegetation types detected in the lacustrine zone:

- On the southwestern edge of the reserve (between the Motta Rossa pass and the valley meadows separating it from Brinzio, traversed by provincial road 62) is the mesophyll broadleaf forest, dominated by beech, ash, and white hornbeam and characterized by a uniform distribution of species such as Carex digitata, Cardamine sphenophylla, Aruncus dioicus, Euphorbia dulcis, Melica nutans, Iris graminea, and Lilium martagon. The legacy of silviculture practiced in past centuries is evident where the dominant beech is accompanied by Carpinus betulus, Prunus avium, and Sorbus aucuparia. Among the grasses, geophytes such as Allium ursinum, Cardamine bulbifera, Cardamine heptaphylla, Polygonatum multiflorum, and Helleborus viridis are present. Where the soil is more sloping (at the slopes of Mt. Legnone), increased runoff alters the undergrowth, where Luzula nivea, Phegopteris connectilis, and Ilex aquifolium appear. Among the allochthonous species (subject to removal during ecosystem maintenance activities) are Robinia pseudoacacia and Buddleja davidii, introduced by humans for silvicultural purposes and gradually naturalized.
- Closer to the reservoir (in constantly waterlogged and often flooded soil) are marsh forests, dominated by black alder (Alnus glutinosa) and, residually, ash willow (Salix cinerea), which colonizes spaces not shaded by alders. In the undergrowth, Phragmites australis, Carex elata, Iris pseudoacorus, and a pronounced layer of Climacium dendroides appear. In places, the marsh forest alternates with hygrophilous forest, in which alder is subordinate to ash, includes dense shrubland, and the undergrowth features Equisetum telmateia, Scirpus sylvaticus, Carex remota, and Viburnum opulus. This habitat also includes fungi such as Lactarius lilacinus, Gyrodon lividus, and Alnicola escharoides.
- Moving away from the wetland (with soil still moist but less frequently flooded), one encounters the ash grove, a hygrophilous forest where Fraxinus excelsior dominates, accompanied by various shrubs (Euonymus europaeus, Viburnum opulus, Rubus spectabilis) and a more diverse complex of grasses (Carex remota, Dryopteris dilatata, Athyrium filix-femina, Equisetum telmateia, among others). Where ash trees have colonized former cultivated meadows, Deschampsia caespitosa, Carex brizoides, and Filipendula ulmaria are also found.
- Bank vegetation (well-present in the southwest) is characterized by reeds, specifically Phragmites australis, with the addition of Filipendula ulmaria, Carex elata, Allium angulosum, and Carex pseudocyperus. More submerged in the water are Schoenoplectus lacustris and Cladium mariscus. A fern rare for the area, Thelypteris palustris, is also very present, along with remnants of Phragmites australis and Carex appropinquata. Where the lake tends to fill with sediment (e.g., after heavy rains) and without anthropogenic intervention, bank vegetation tends to proliferate further into the basin.
- In the water, vegetation depends on the current: where it is very weak, the lamineto appears, composed of Nymphaea alba and Potamogeton crispus; where it is strong, Lagarosiphon major dominates. At the resurgences below provincial road 62 are Cardamine amara and water lentil (Lemna minor).
- Meadows cultivated for forage, although diminished due to reduced grassland and weather damage, remain a notable vegetation type in the lake basin. Their biodiversity depends on anthropogenic activity (frequency of mowing and fertilization), but typically Arrhenatherum elatius, Festuca rubra, Anthoxanthum odoratum, Leontodon hispidus, Centaurea nigrescens, Poa trivialis, and Holcus lanatus are found. Where the meadow is abandoned near the wetland, weeds (Deschampsia caespitosa, Agrostis stolonifera, Filipendula ulmaria, and Scirpus sylvaticus) develop, while in mowed areas, Geum rivale, Filipendula ulmaria, Cynosurus cristatus, and the moss Climacium dendroides are present. Rare species such as Valeriana dioica and Senecio aquaticus are also present. On the other hand, abandoned meadows in less humid areas tend to turn into ash woodland or be colonized by nitrophilous grasses (Anthriscus sylvestris, Urtica dioica, Galeopsis pubescens, Geum urbanum).
- Some former grassland areas toward the south have been replanted with allochthonous species such as Pinus strobus, Larix kaempferi, and Picea abies, which, as their needles fall, acidify the soil, reducing or eliminating the variety of undergrowth. This is also the case where Platanus hybrida has been planted.
- Due to human intervention (and subject to replacement where possible, as they are sometimes weeds) are formations of Prunus laurocerasus, Cedrus deodara, Pseudotsuga menziesii, Sambucus nigra, Bromus sterilis, Parietaria officinalis, Lamium maculatum, Chelidonium majus, Plantago major, and Lolium perenne.

=== Fauna ===
Lake Brinzio serves as an ecologically important biotope, providing breeding grounds for amphibians such as the common toad and supporting various fish species, including trout, pike, and tench. No invasive crayfish, catfish, or torpedo fish have been recorded in the lake.

Nests of birds such as mallard, grey heron, moorhen, water hen, water rail, kingfisher, and yellow wagtail can be spotted on the banks.

== Lake Brinzio in mass culture ==
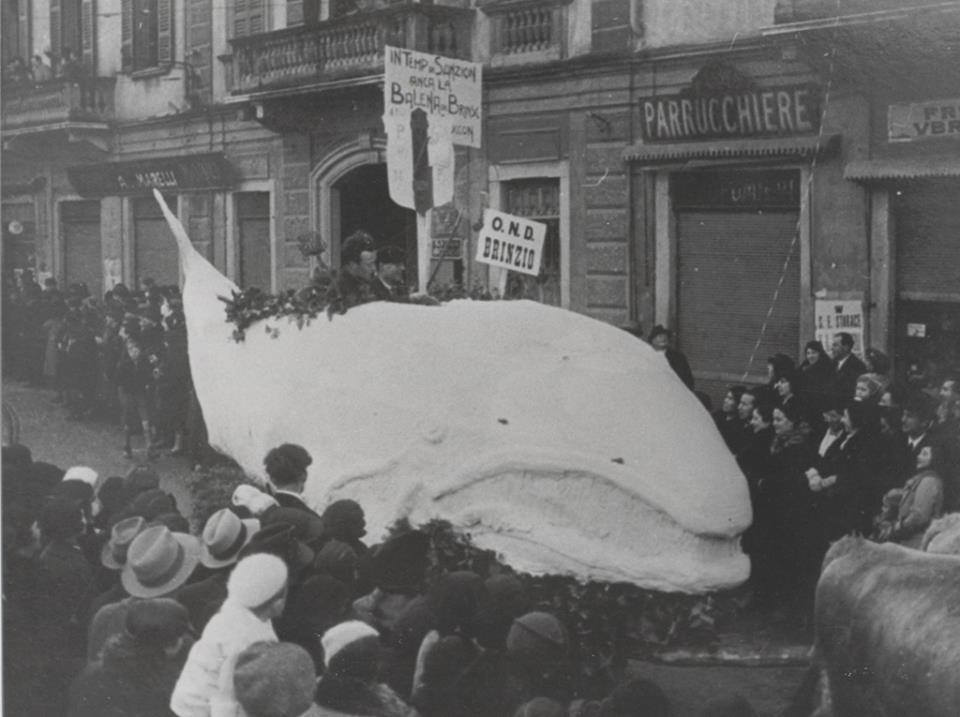
An allegorical float depicting the Whale of Brinzio, presented by the Brinzio section of the OND at the Varese carnival parade in 1935.

A local legend associated with Lake Brinzio dates back to at least the 18th century. According to the tale, during a violent storm, passers-by observed a dark silhouette in the water, which they mistook for a large fish or even a whale. A group of villagers attempted to retrieve the object, only to discover that it was a large log, likely dislodged and carried into the lake by the storm. Despite the misidentification, the story gained popularity throughout the Varese area, and Lake Brinzio became colloquially known as the “Whale Lake”. As a result, residents of Brinzio are sometimes referred to by the local nickname "whales".

Over time, the whale has become a symbolic element of Brinzio's local identity. It has been incorporated into various forms of cultural expression and territorial branding. Notably, in both 1935 and 2000, residents of Brinzio participated in the Varese Carnival parade with floats depicting a whale, emphasizing the folkloric and emblematic significance of the legend.

== Bibliography ==
- Quaglia, Giuseppe (1884). Laghi e torbiere del circondario di Varese [Lakes and peat bogs in the Varese district] (PDF) (in Italian). Varese: Tipografia Macchi & Brusa. Archived from the original (PDF) on 7 March 2022.
- Scaramuzzi, Carlo (2010). Ricordi di un Brinzio lontano, collana Il vento della memoria [Memories of a distant Brinzio, The Wind of Memory series] (in Italian). Macchione Editore. ISBN 978-88-6570-000-6.
