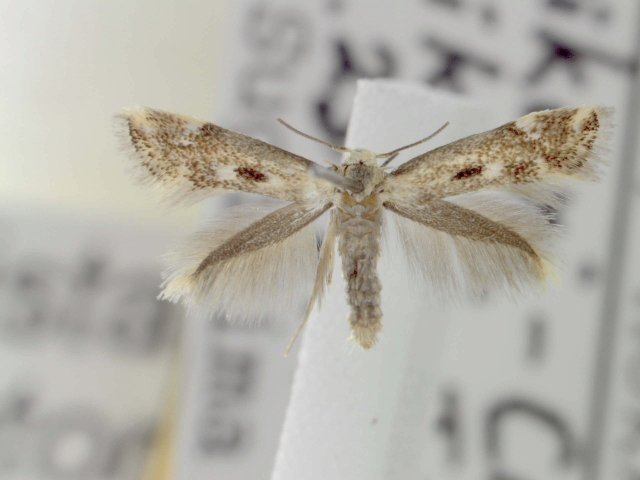

Scientific classification
- Domain: Eukaryota
- Kingdom: Animalia
- Phylum: Arthropoda
- Class: Insecta
- Order: Lepidoptera
- Family: Elachistidae
- Genus: Elachista
- Species: E. utonella

Binomial name
- Elachista utonella Frey, 1856

Synonyms
- Biselachista utonella; Elachista paludum Frey, 1859; Elachista caricis Stainton, 1859; Elachista palustrella Morris, 1870; Elachista carinisella Morris, 1870

= Elachista utonella =

Species of moth

Elachista utonella is a moth of the family Elachistidae found in Asia and Europe.

== Description ==
The wingspan is 8–9 millimetres (0.31–0.35 in). The head is grey in the male, whitish in the female. Forewings are rather dark fuscous or ochreous-grey, pale-sprinkled, lighter in female; plical stigma elongate, black, preceded and followed by whitish marks; a small tornal spot, and larger triangular anteriorly dark-edged opposite costal spot white. Hindwings are dark grey. The larva is grey; head brown; 2 pale yellowish, with two brown spots. Dissection is necessary to separate the moth from the similar Elachista albidella and Elachista eleochariella.

There is one generation per year in Great Britain, but there are possibly two generations in continental Europe.

The larvae feed on lesser pond-sedge (Carex acutiformis), Carex brizoides, distant sedge (Carex distans), brown sedge (Carex disticha), star sedge (Carex echinata), Carex elata, glaucous sedge (Carex flacca), hairy sedge (Carex hirta), Carex muricata, greater tussock-sedge (Carex paniculata), Carex remota, greater pond sedge (Carex riparia), spiked sedge (Carex spicata), bladder sedge (Carex vesicaria), fescue (Festuca species), saltmarsh rush (Juncus gerardii) and Scirus sylvaticus. They mine the leaves of their host plant.

== Distribution ==
Elachista utonella is found from Fennoscandia to the Pyrenees and Italy and from Ireland to Romania. It is also found in the Russian Far East and Japan.
