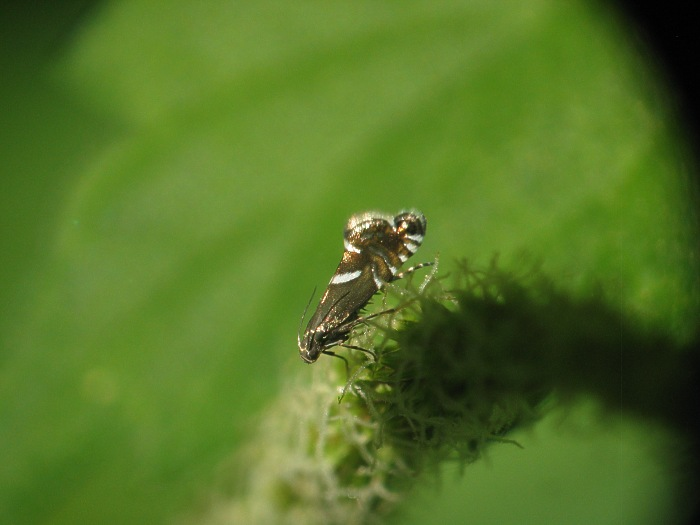

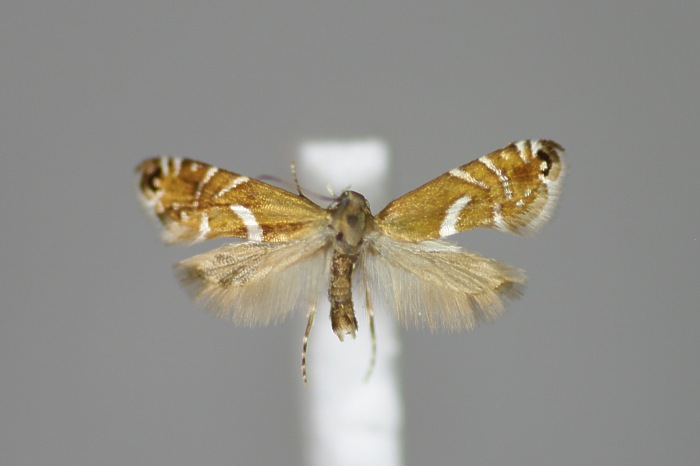

Scientific classification
- Kingdom: Animalia
- Phylum: Arthropoda
- Clade: Pancrustacea
- Class: Insecta
- Order: Lepidoptera
- Family: Glyphipterigidae
- Genus: Glyphipterix
- Species: G. forsterella

Binomial name
- Glyphipterix forsterella (Fabricius, 1781)

Synonyms
- Tinea forsterella Fabricius, 1781; Aechmia lucasella Duponchel, 1838; Glyphiptryx variella Zeller, 1850 (nec Fabricius, 1794); Aechmia oculatella Zeller, 1850; Glyphipteryx albimaculella von Heinemann, 1877; Glyphipterix forsterella f. nivicaput Diakonoff, 1979

= Glyphipterix forsterella =

Species of moth

Glyphipterix forsterella is a moth of the family Glyphipterigidae. It is found from most of Europe (except most of the Balkan Peninsula, Portugal and Ukraine), east to Japan.

The wingspan is 11–15 mm (0.43–0.59 in). The forewings are rather broad, dark bronzy - fuscous; five white streaks from posterior half of costa, second becoming silvery-metallic and reaching beyond middle; a broader slightly curved oblique white mark from middle of dorsum, reaching half across wing a short white mark before tornus; two or three silvery-metallic dots about tornus; a black apical spot enclosing a silvery- metallic dot; dark line of cilia indented below apex; a dark hook above apex. Hindwings are grey.

Adults are on wing from May to June and feed on the flowers of the larval host plant. There is one generation per year.

The larvae feed on the seeds of Carex species, including Carex vulpina and Carex remota. The species overwinters in the larval stage within the spikes of the host plant.

== Subspecies ==
- Glyphipterix forsterella forsterella
- Glyphipterix forsterella albimaculella von Heinemann, 1876 (Central Europe)
- Glyphipterix forsterella nivicaput Diakonoff, 1979 (Japan: Honshu)
