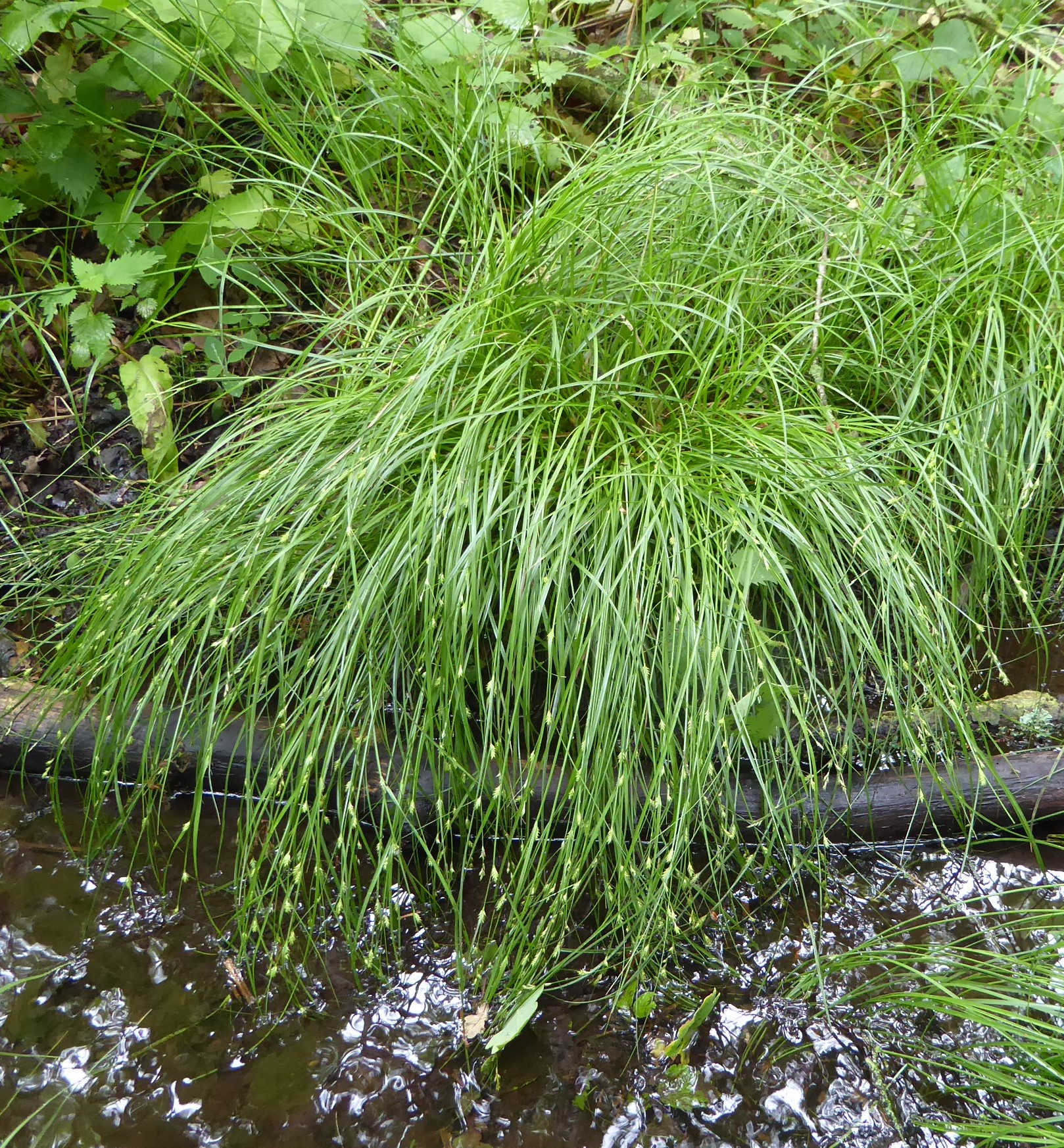
- Ripening seedhead

Conservation status
- Least Concern (IUCN 3.1)

Scientific classification
- Kingdom: Plantae
- Clade: Tracheophytes
- Clade: Angiosperms
- Clade: Monocots
- Clade: Commelinids
- Order: Poales
- Family: Cyperaceae
- Genus: Carex
- Species: C. remota

Binomial name
- Carex remota L.

Synonyms
- List: Caricina remota (L.) St.-Lag.; Diemisa remota (L.) Raf.; Vignea remota (L.) Rchb.

= Carex remota =

Species of flowering plant

Carex remota, the remote sedge, is a species in the genus Carex, native to Europe, the Atlas Mountains in Africa, and western Asia. It is a riparian forest specialist. It is known as one of the most frequently hybridizing species of Carex, forming hybrids with C. appropinquata, C. arenaria, C. brizoides, C. canescens, C. divulsa, C. echinata, C. elongata, C. leporina, (Note: C. leporina is often called by the synonym, a nom. illeg., Carex ovalis.) C. otrubae, C. paniculata, and C. spicata.

== Description ==
Remote sedge forms grass-like clumps up to 75 cm tall by 30 cm in diameter. The stems are green, trigonous (i.e. triangular in section) and faintly serrated above the top leaf (which is, technically, the peduncle). The leaves are 30–60 cm long, v-shaped and upright, turning flat and drooping towards the tips, bright green and finely serrated. The inflorescence consists of 4–10 sessile spikes which corkscrew up the stem, typically about 5 mm long and very pale green.

== Subspecies ==
The following subspecies are currently accepted:

- Carex remota subsp. remota
- Carex remota subsp. stewartii Kukkonen
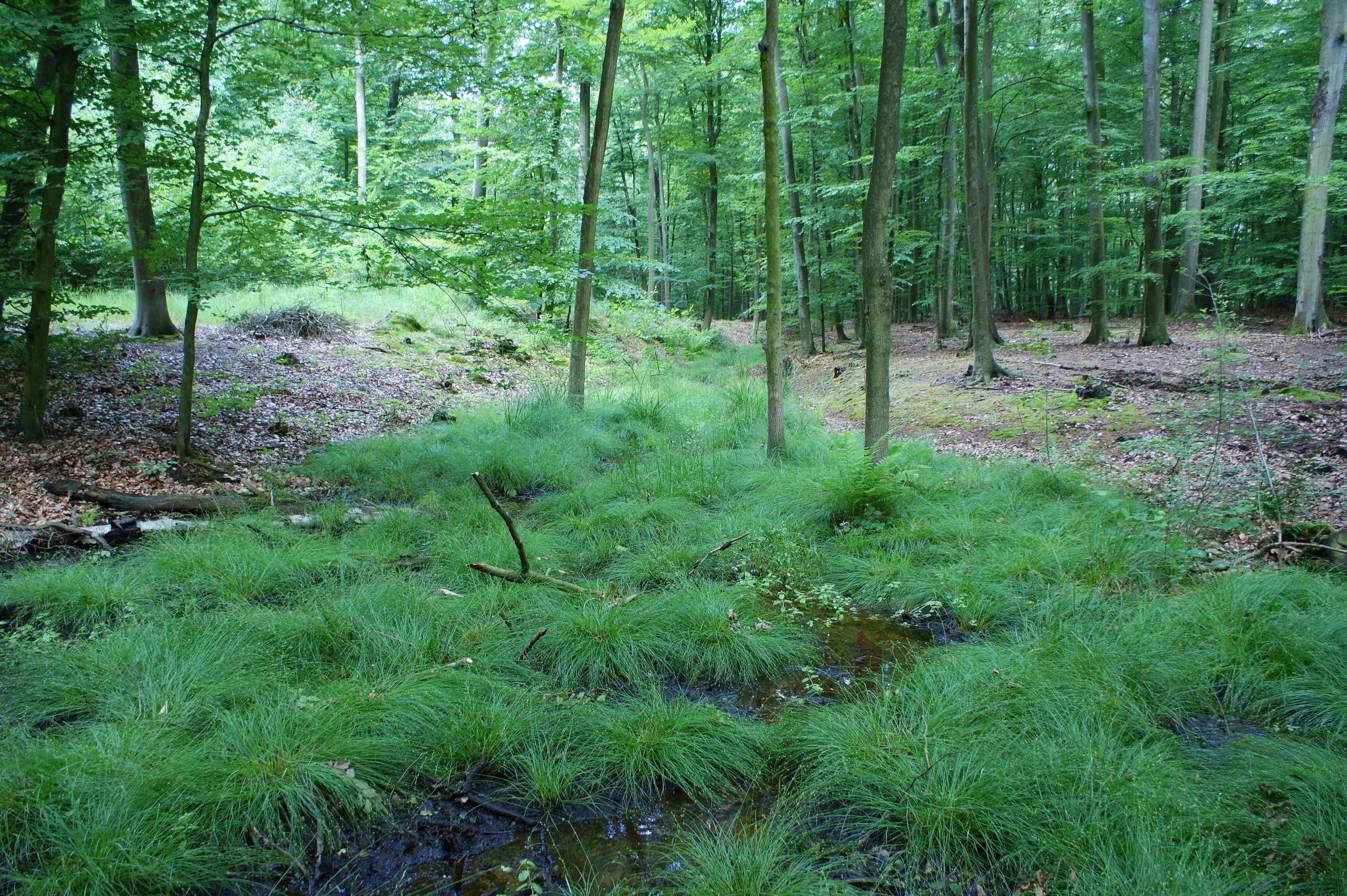
In its typical habitat
