= Fox sedge =

Fox sedge is a common name for several plants and may refer to:

- Carex vulpina, native to Europe and western Asia
- Carex vulpinoidea, native to North America and naturalized in Europe and New Zealand
