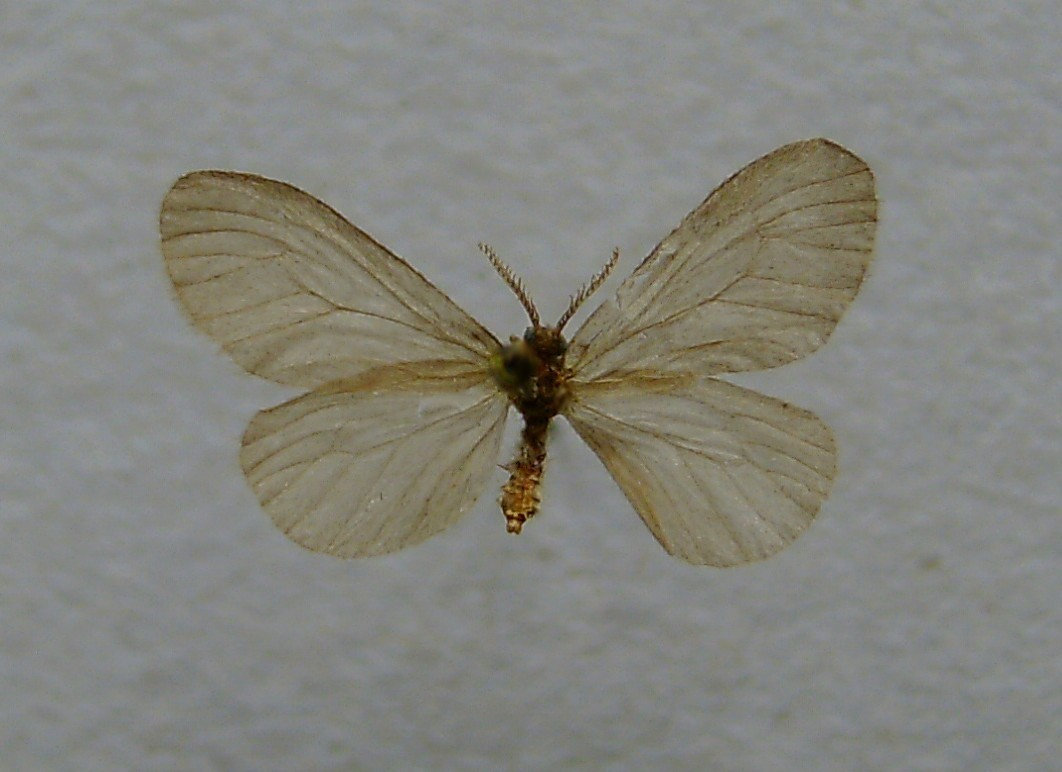

Scientific classification
- Domain: Eukaryota
- Kingdom: Animalia
- Phylum: Arthropoda
- Class: Insecta
- Order: Lepidoptera
- Family: Psychidae
- Genus: Sterrhopterix
- Species: S. fusca

Binomial name
- Sterrhopterix fusca (Haworth, 1809)

Synonyms
- Sterrhopterix hirsutella Hübner, 1793

= Sterrhopterix fusca =

Species of moth

Sterrhopterix fusca is a moth of the Psychidae family. It is found from England through central Europe, east to Russia, north to Fennoscandia, the Baltic States and Karelia. The southern limit of its range ranges from northern Italy to Romania.

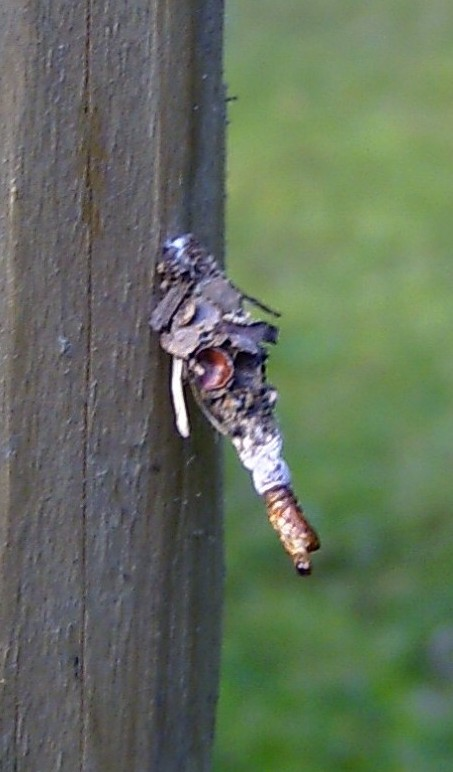
Male case

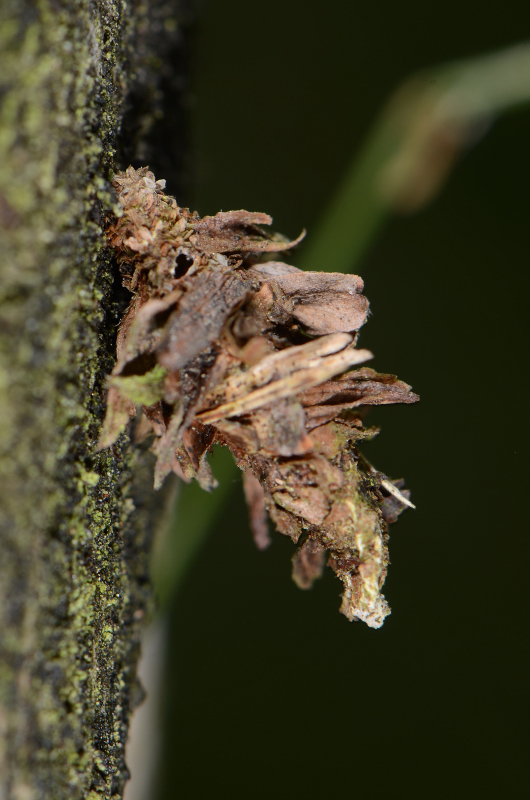
Case

There is strong sexual dimorphism in the adults. Males have a wingspan of 16–20 mm, females reach a length of 6–8 mm and are wingless. Adults are on wing from June to July in one generation.

The larvae feed on various plants, including Bromus erectus, Carex brizoides, Ulmus, Alnus, Betula, Quercus, Prunus spinosa, Hippophae rhamnoides and Vaccinium uliginosum.
