= Sterrhopterix =

Scientific classification
- Kingdom: Animalia
- Phylum: Arthropoda
- Clade: Pancrustacea
- Class: Insecta
- Order: Lepidoptera
- Family: Psychidae
- Genus: Sterrhopterix; Hübner, 1825

Genus of moths

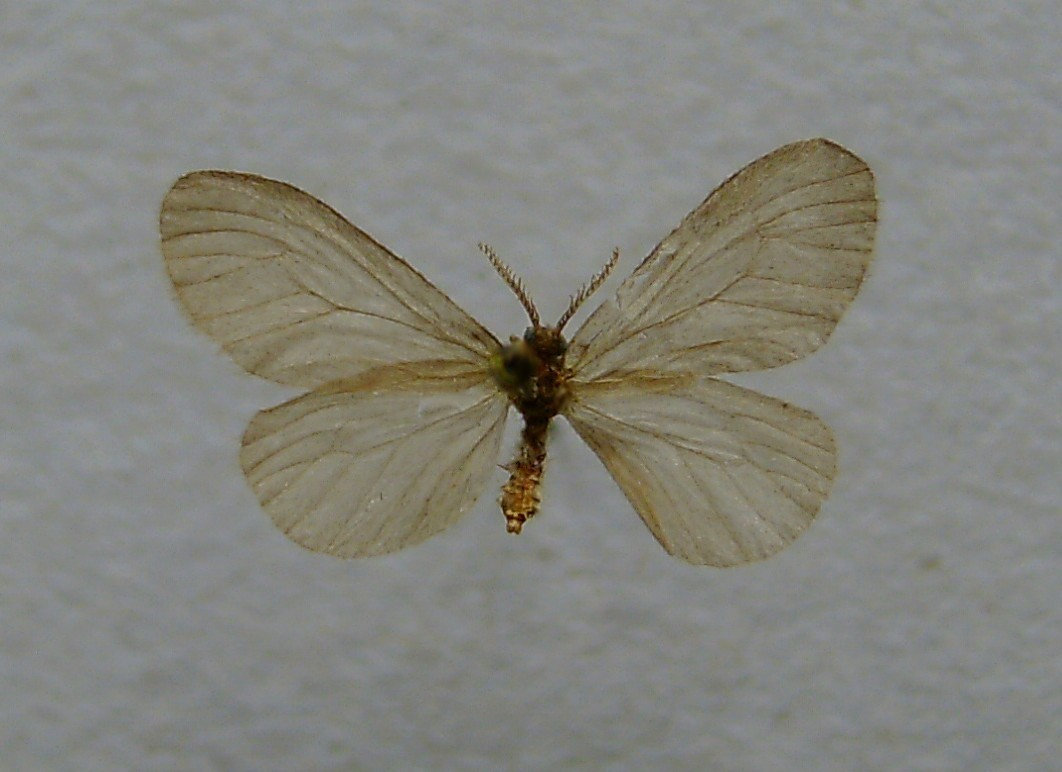
Sterrhopterix fusca

Sterrhopterix is a genus of moths belonging to the family Psychidae.

The species of this genus are found in Europe and Russia.

Species:

- Sterrhopterix fusca (Haworth, 1809)
- Sterrhopterix standfussi (Wocke, 1851)
