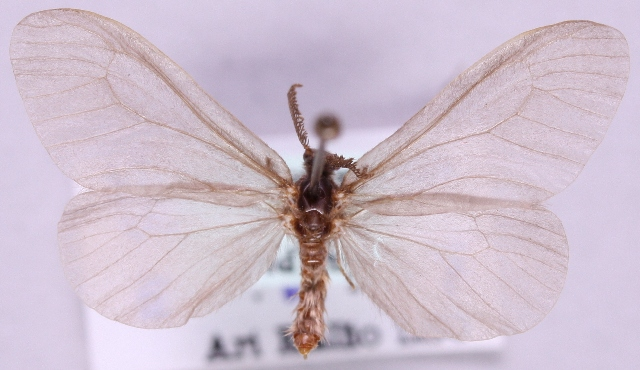

Scientific classification
- Domain: Eukaryota
- Kingdom: Animalia
- Phylum: Arthropoda
- Class: Insecta
- Order: Lepidoptera
- Family: Psychidae
- Genus: Sterrhopterix
- Species: S. standfussi

Binomial name
- Sterrhopterix standfussi (Wocke, 1851)

Synonyms
- Psyche standfussi Wocke, 1851; Psyche zermattensis Frey, 1880; Sterrhopteryx kurenzovi Filipjev, 1927; Sterrhopteryx sajanella Kozhanchikov, 1929; Sterrhopteryx constrastella Kozhanchikov, 1929

= Sterrhopterix standfussi =

Species of moth

Sterrhopterix standfussi is a moth of the Psychidae family. It was described by Wocke in 1851. It is found in northern and central Europe.

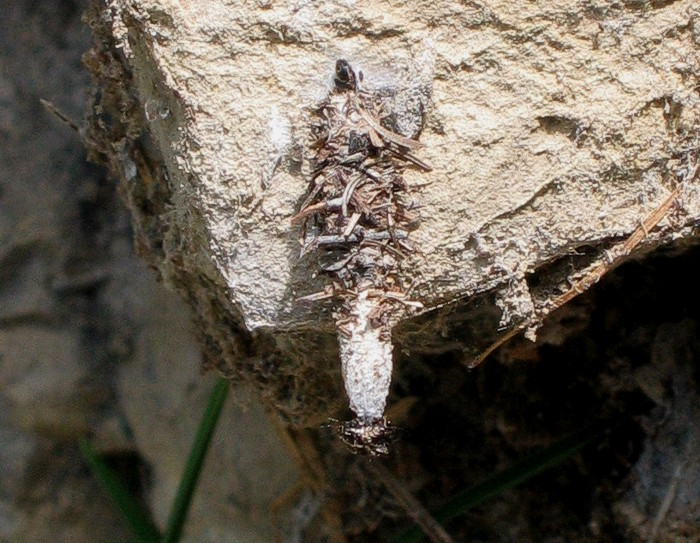
Case

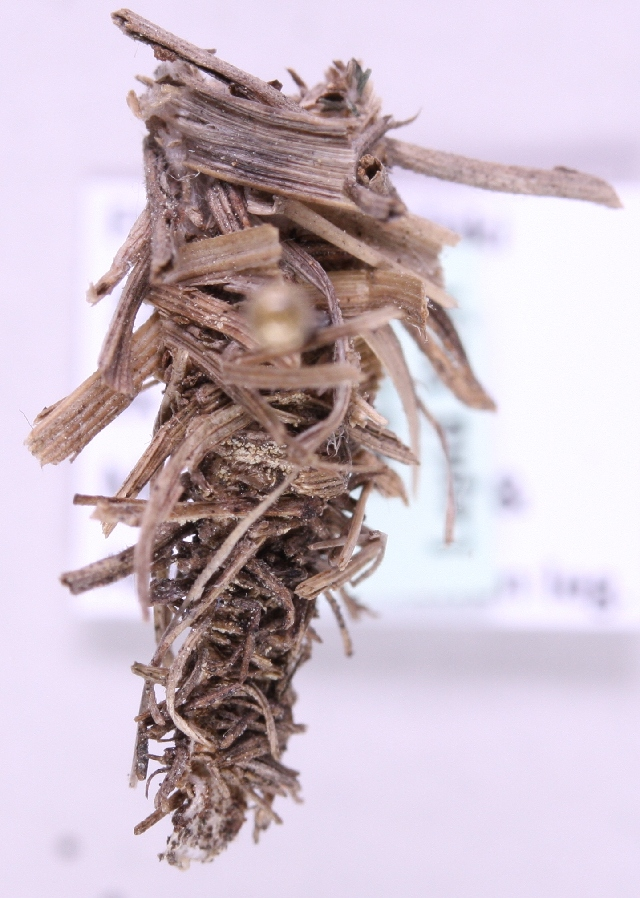
Case

The wingspan is 27–29 mm. Adults are on wing in June.

The larvae feed on a wide range of plants, including Betula species (Betula verrucosa, Betula pubescens, Betula nana), Alnus incana, Salix caprea, Salix pentandra, Salix aurita, Salix cinerea, Salix phylicifolia, Populus tremula, Philadelphus coronarius, Rubus idaeus, Filipendula ulmaria, Sorbus aucuparia, Vaccinium uliginosum and Ledum palustre.
