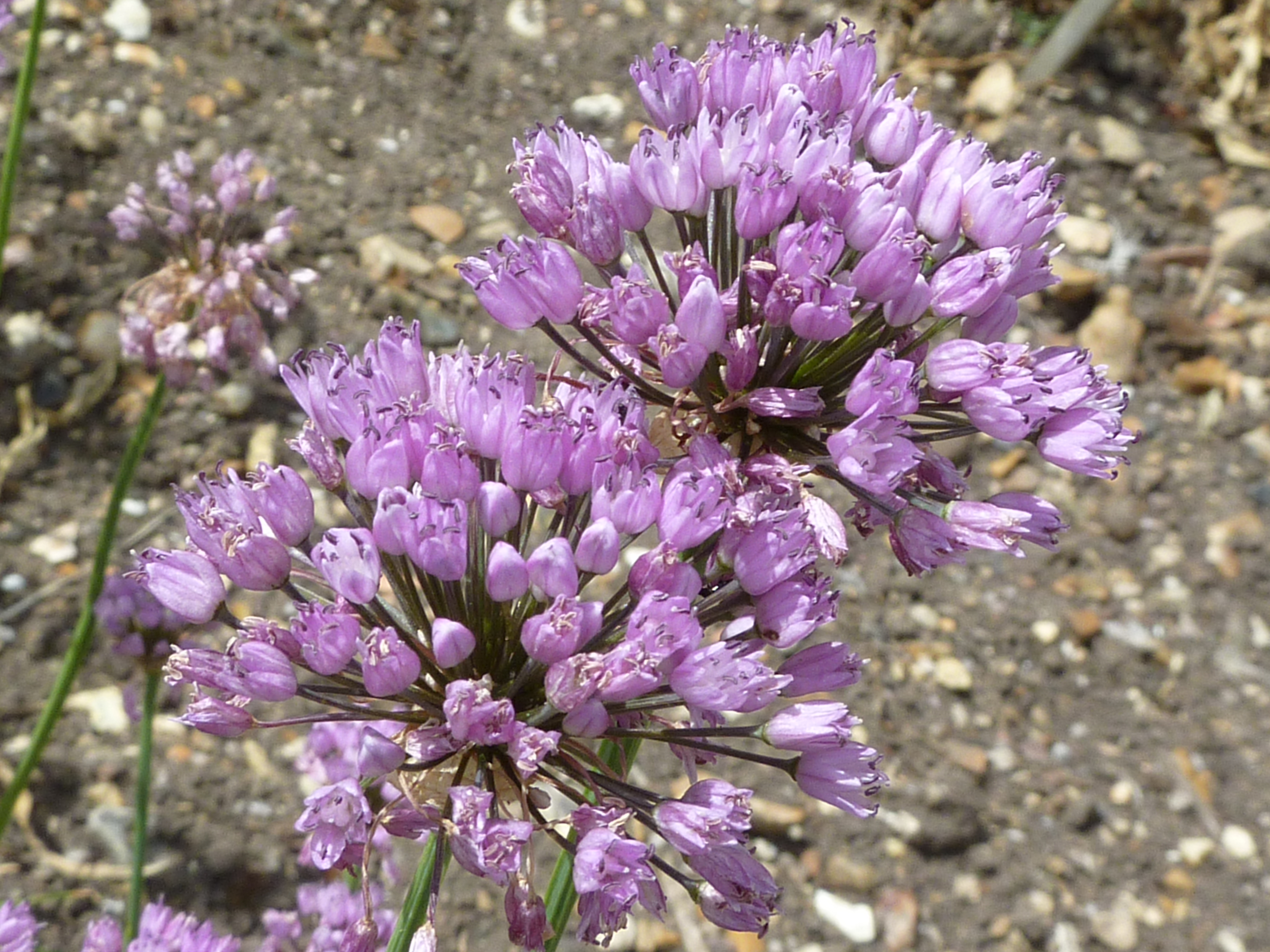

Scientific classification
- Kingdom: Plantae
- Clade: Tracheophytes
- Clade: Angiosperms
- Clade: Monocots
- Order: Asparagales
- Family: Amaryllidaceae
- Subfamily: Allioideae
- Genus: Allium
- Subgenus: A. subg. Rhizirideum
- Species: A. angulosum

Binomial name
- Allium angulosum L. 1753 not All. 1785 nor Krock. 1787 nor Lour. 1790 nor DC. 1805 nor Pursh. 1813

Synonyms
- Species synonymy: Allium acutangulum Schrad.; Allium acutangulum var. senescens Nyman; Allium angulare Pall.; Allium angulatum Pall.; Allium angulosum Krock.; Allium angulosum var. danubiale (Spreng.) Trevir.; Allium angulosum var. latifolium Regel; Allium angulosum subsp. latifolium (Regel) K.Richt.; Allium calcareum Wallr.; Allium danubiale Spreng.; Allium flavescens var. stramineum Nyman; Allium inodorum Willd.; Allium laxum G.Don; Allium lusitanicum F.Delaroche; Allium microcephalum Willd. ex Kunth; Allium odorum Kar. & Kir.; Allium reticulatum Wallr.; Allium senescens Suter; Allium stramineum Schur; Allium triquetrum Schrad. ex Schult. & Schult.f.; Allium uliginosum Kanitz; Cepa angulosa (L.) Bernh.; Maligia fastigiata Raf.; Xylorhiza angulosa (L.) Salisb.

= Allium angulosum =

Mouse garlic

Species of flowering plant

Allium angulosum, the mouse garlic, is a species of garlic native to a wide region of central Europe and northern Asia, from France and Italy to Siberia and Kazakhstan.

Allium angulosum is a perennial herb up to 50 cm tall. Bulbs are narrow and elongated, about 5 mm in diameter. The plant produces a hemispherical umbel of small pink flowers on long pedicels.

== Uses ==
Allium angulosum is cultivated as an ornamental and also as an herb for kitchen gardens. Bulbs and leaves are edible cooked or in salads. There are, however, some reports of being toxic in large quantities.
