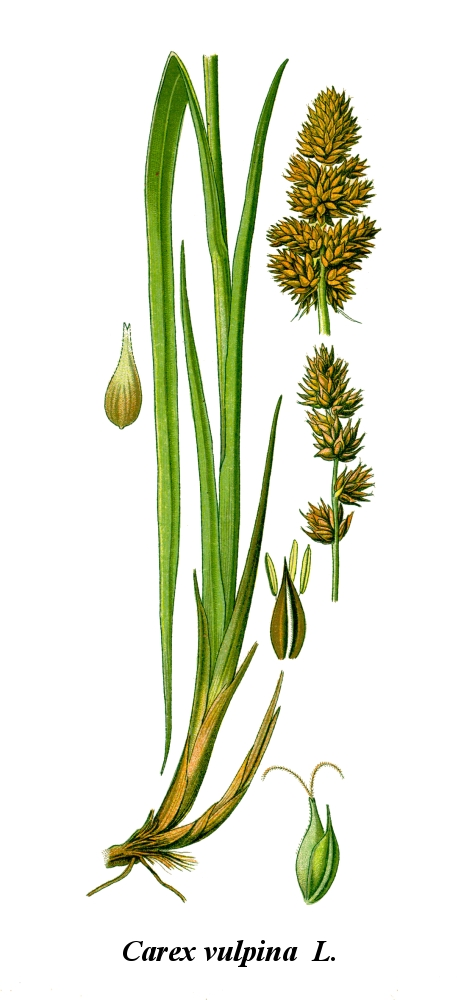
- Botanical illustration
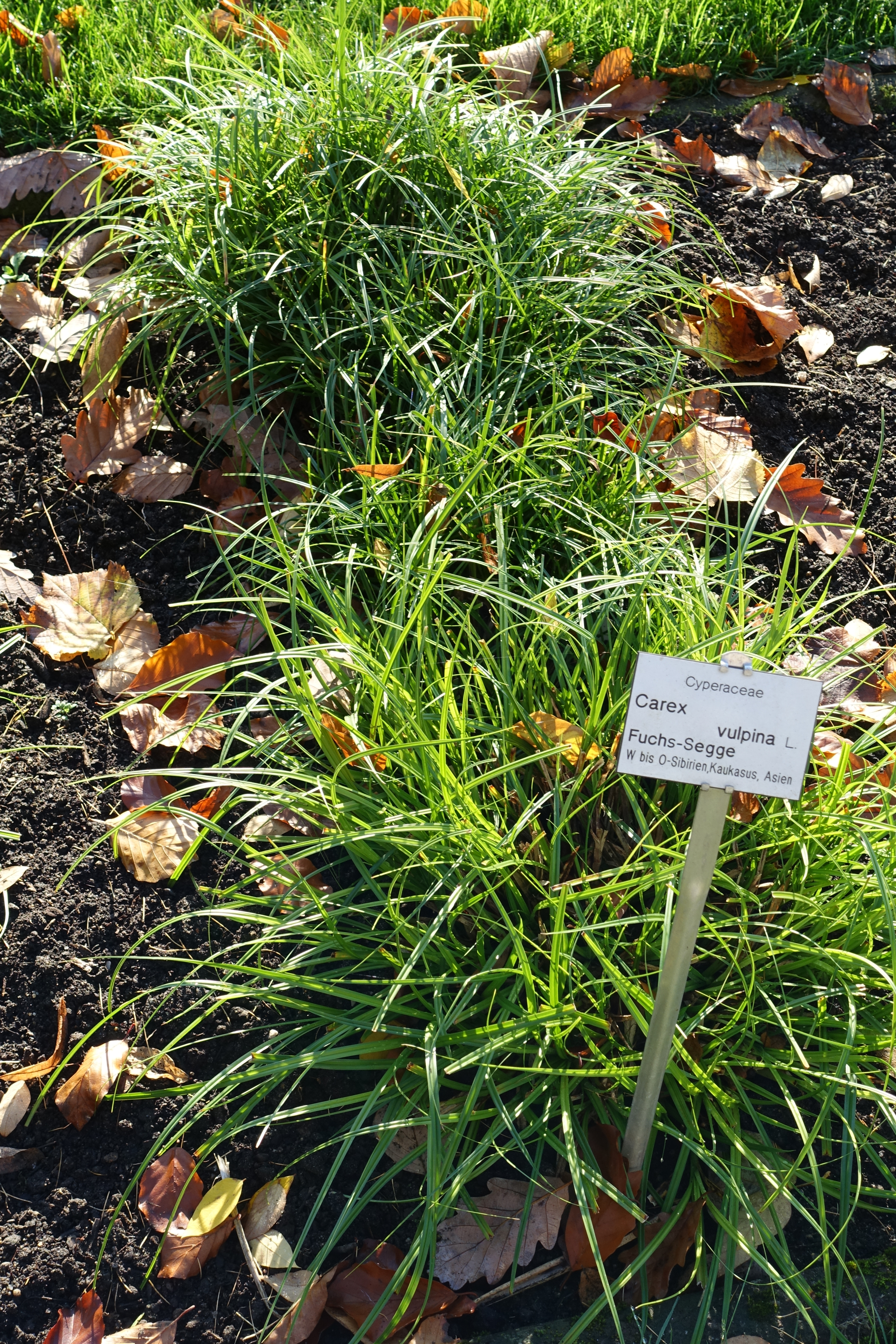
- At the Botanical Garden Munich-Nymphenburg

Conservation status
- Least Concern (IUCN 3.1)

Scientific classification
- Kingdom: Plantae
- Clade: Tracheophytes
- Clade: Angiosperms
- Clade: Monocots
- Clade: Commelinids
- Order: Poales
- Family: Cyperaceae
- Genus: Carex
- Species: C. vulpina

Binomial name
- Carex vulpina L.

Synonyms
- List: Carex brotherorum Christ; Carex compacta Lam.; Carex glomerata Gilib. ex Bubani; Carex mertensis Weihe ex Kunth; Carex reflexa D.Dietr. ex Kunth; Carex spicata Thuill.; Carex vulpina f. capitulata (Peterm.) Soó; Edritria vulpina (L.) Raf.; Vignea vulpina (L.) Rchb.

= Carex vulpina =

Species of grass-like plant in the sedge family

Carex vulpina, the true fox sedge, is a species in the genus Carex, native to Europe and western Asia.

== Description ==
Carex vulpina can be identified by its reddish-brown inflorescence, appearing in June and July. It has sturdy, triangular stems, winged in cross-section, with bright green, flat leaves. It can reach 0.95m in height, and is often confused with its relative Carex otrubae, the False Fox-sedge.

== Distribution and habitat ==
Carex vulpina is widespread throughout Europe to Xinjiang.

It favours a lowland wetland habitat, such as river banks, ditches and seasonally flooding meadows. Though not considered to be a species of global concern, it is considered vulnerable in the UK.
