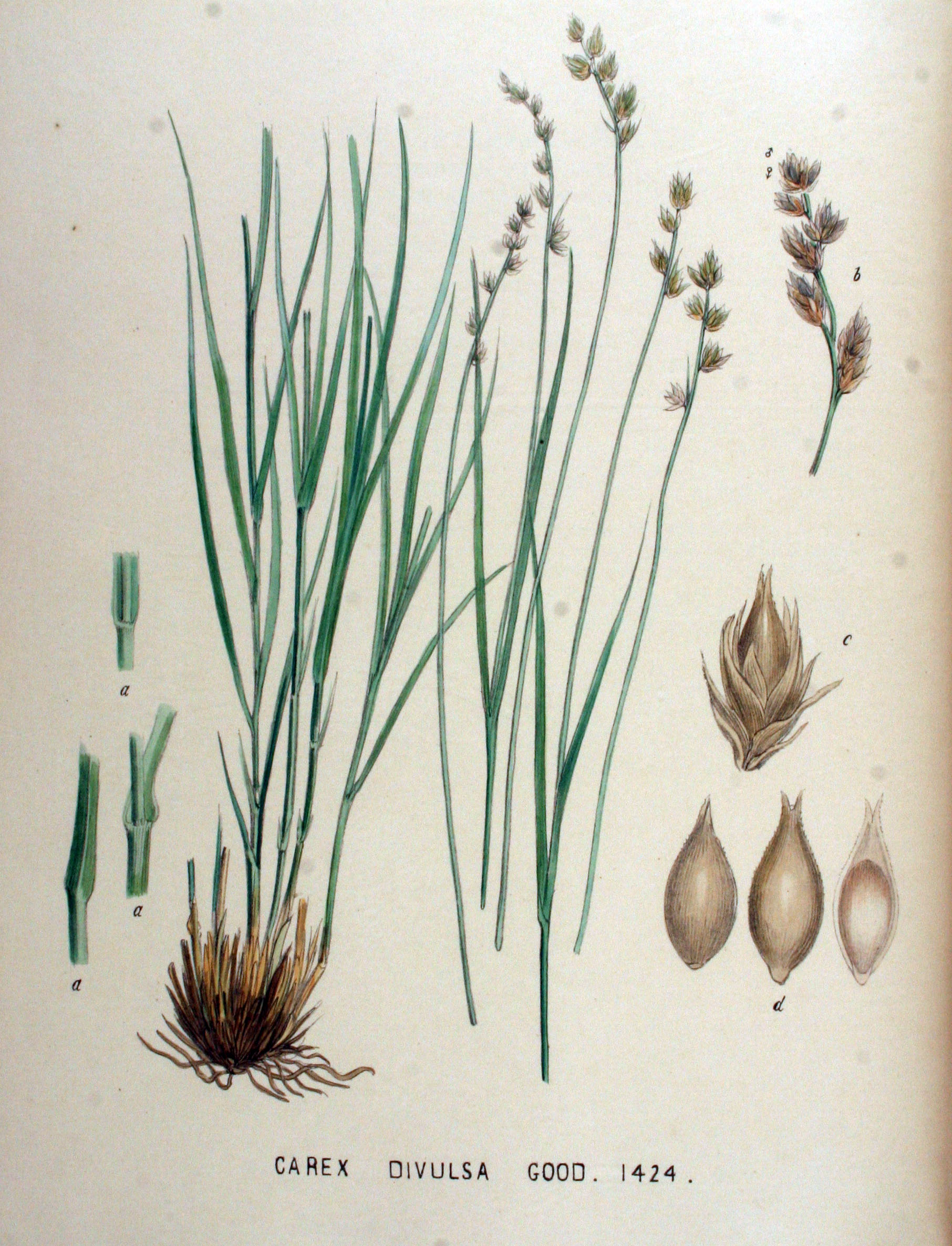
- Botanical illustration

Scientific classification
- Kingdom: Plantae
- Clade: Tracheophytes
- Clade: Angiosperms
- Clade: Monocots
- Clade: Commelinids
- Order: Poales
- Family: Cyperaceae
- Genus: Carex
- Species: C. divulsa

Binomial name
- Carex divulsa Stokes

Synonyms
- List: Carex canescens Huds.; Carex divulsa f. angustifolia (Podp.) Soó; Carex muricata proles lumnitzeri Rouy; Carex muricata var. virens (Lam.) Rchb.; Carex nemorosa Lumn.; Carex persica Nelmes; Carex subramosa Willd. ex Kunth; Carex virens Lam.; Carex virens var. divulsa (Stokes) F.W.Schultz; Caricina divulsa (Stokes) St.-Lag.; Vignea divulsa (Stokes) Rchb.; Vignea guestphalica Rchb.; Vignea persica (Nelmes) Soják; Vignea virens (Lam.) Rchb.

= Carex divulsa =

Species of grass-like plant

Carex divulsa, the grey sedge, is a species of flowering plant in the genus Carex, native to Macaronesia, Europe, northwest Africa, the Caucasus region, and the Middle East as far east as Turkmenistan. It has been introduced to northeast Argentina, the District of Columbia and Pennsylvania in the United States, Ontario in Canada, the North Island of New Zealand, and Tasmania and Victoria in Australia. It is the namesake of the Carex divulsa aggregate.

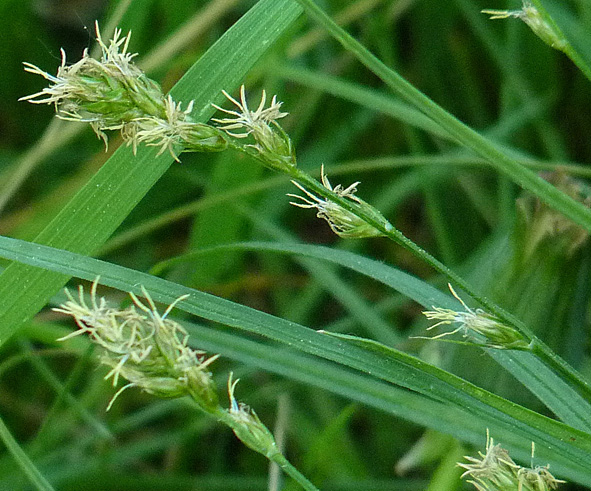
Inflorescences

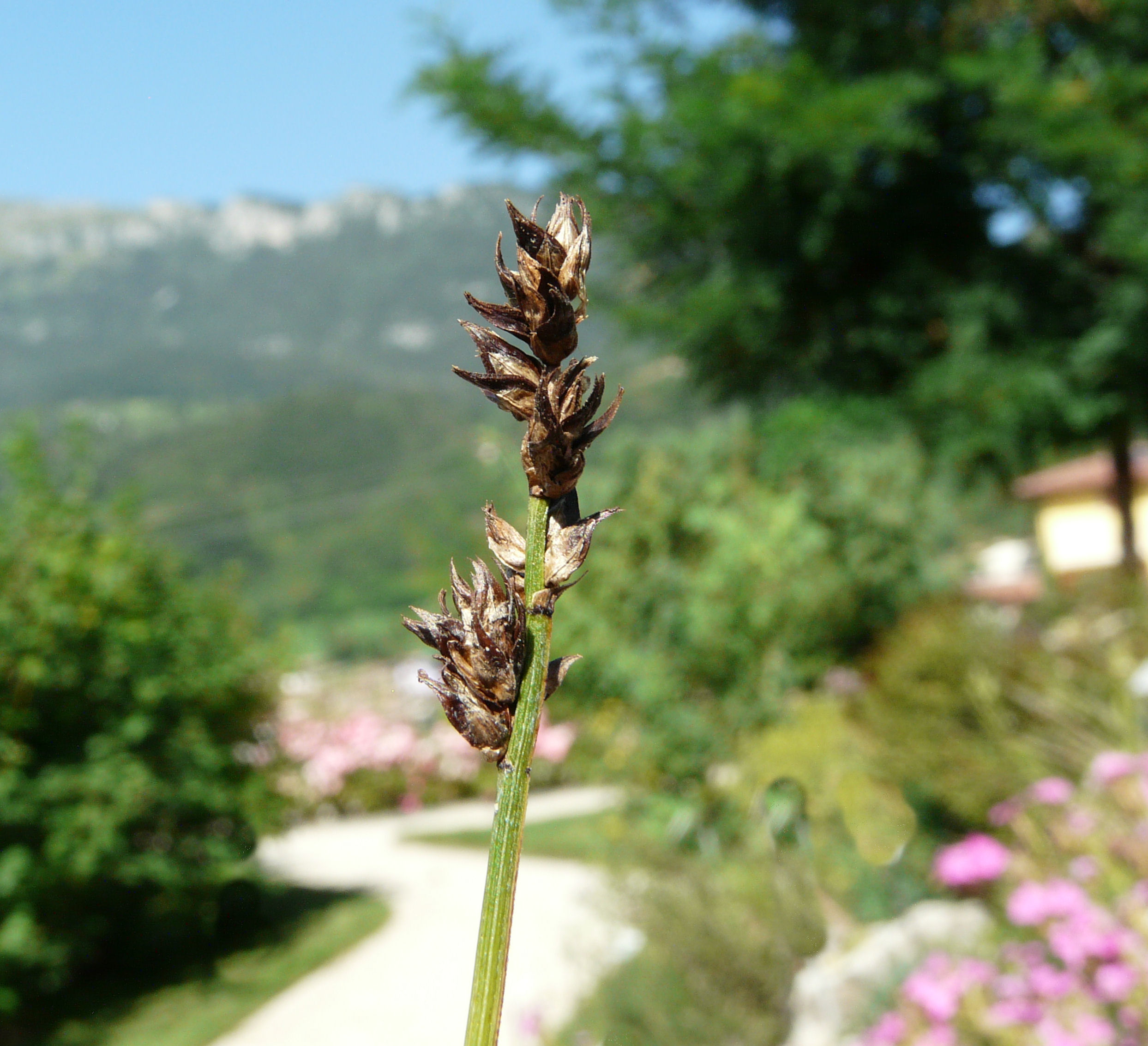
Seedhead

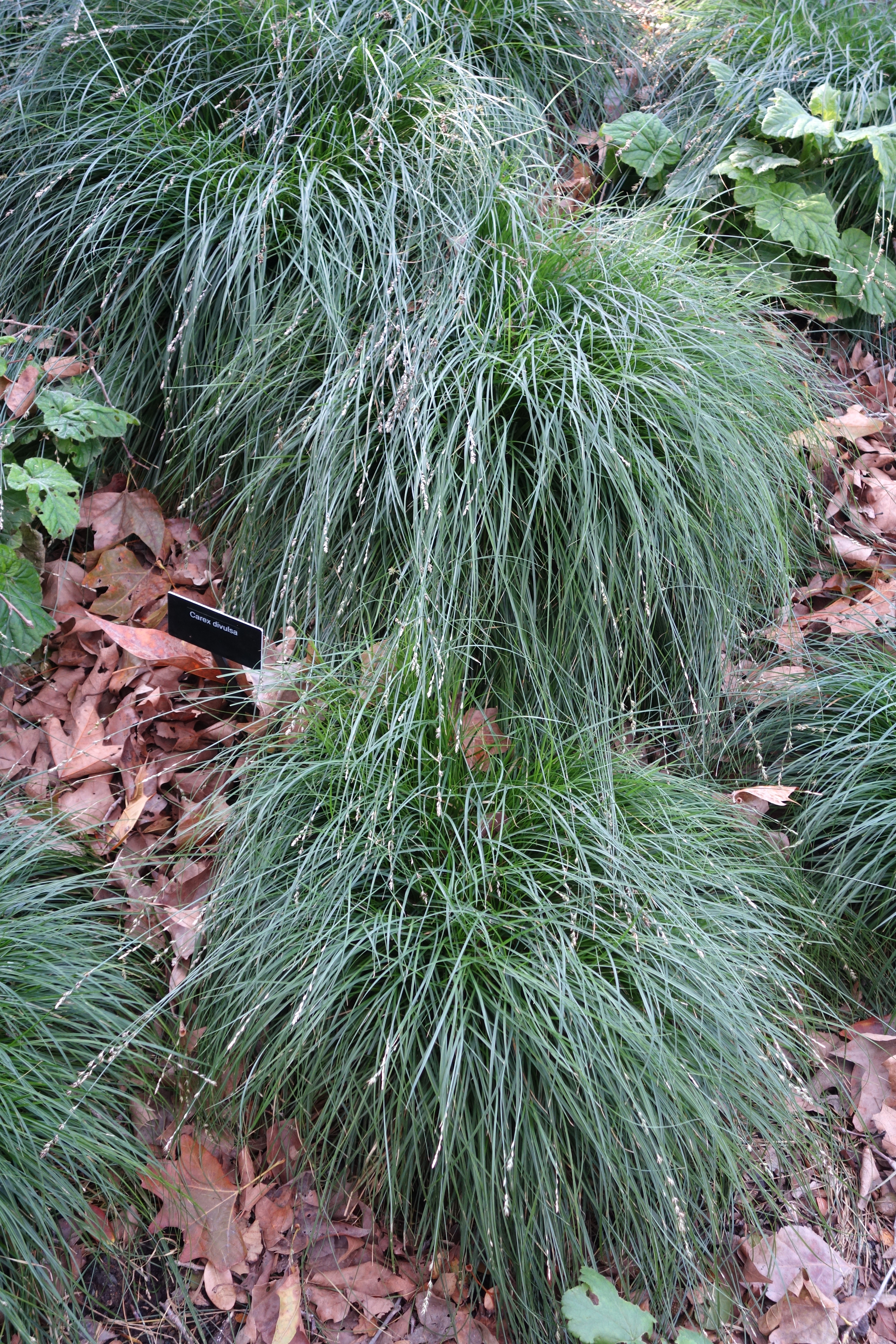
Habit

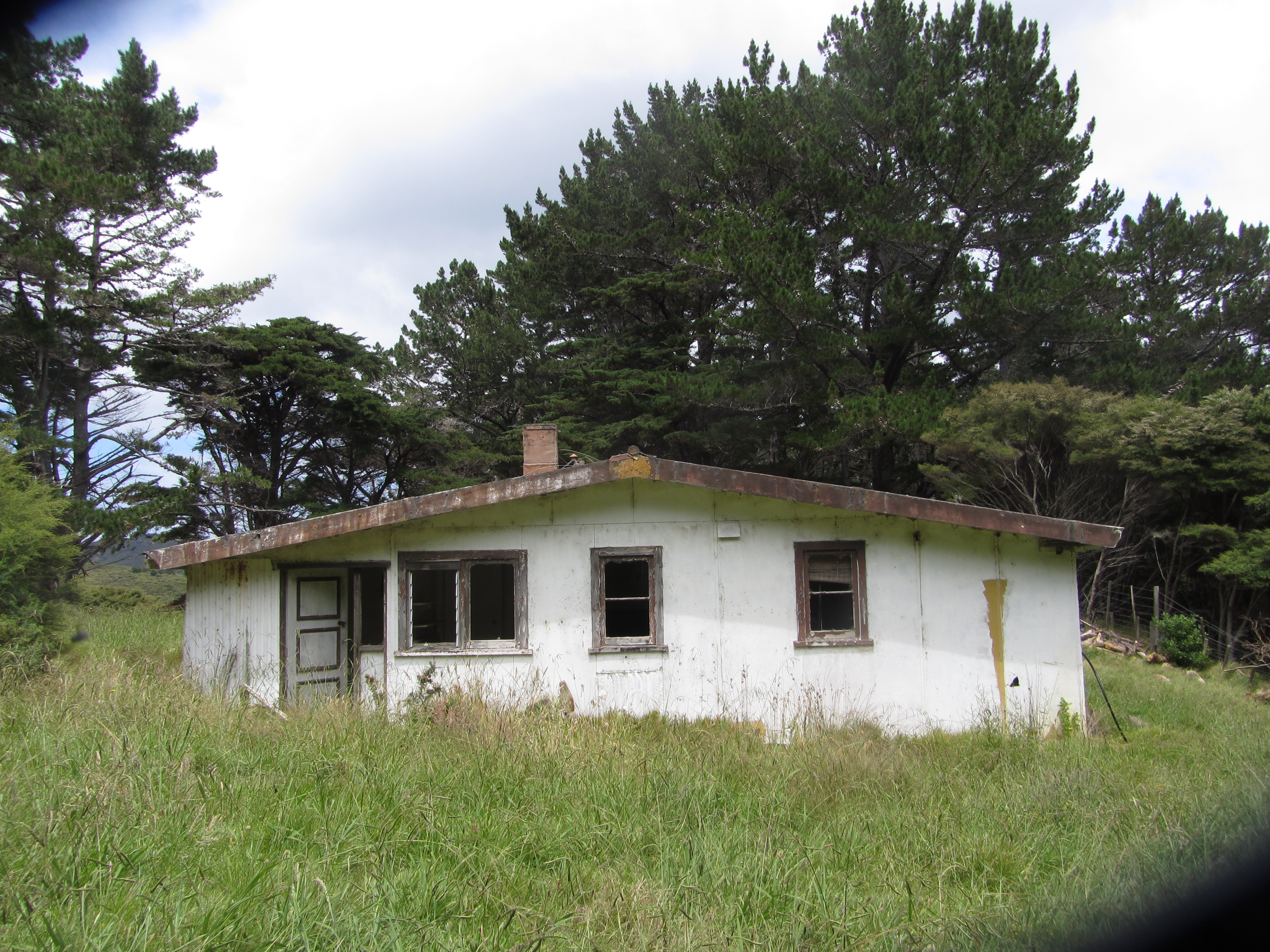
In New Zealand
