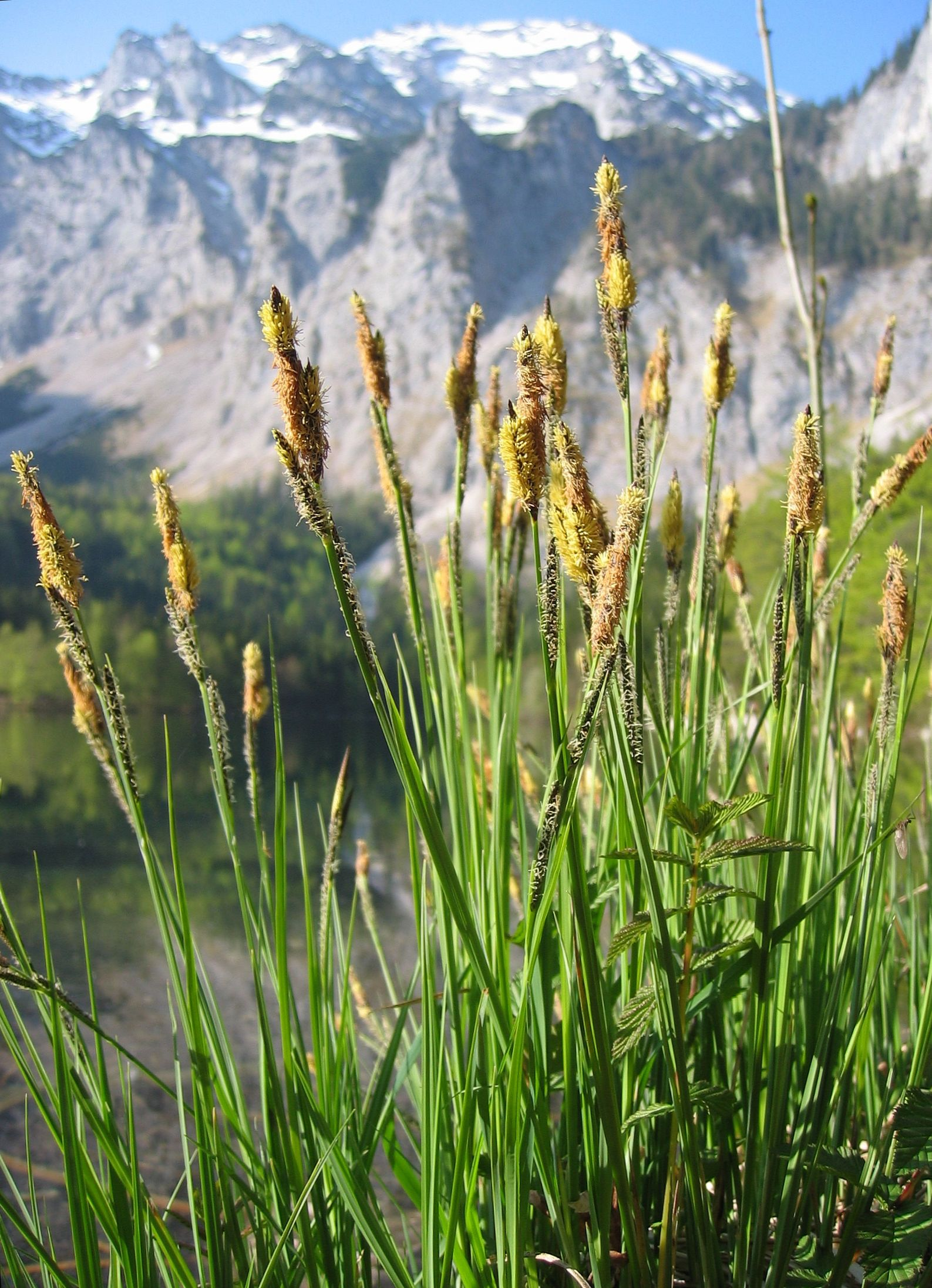

Conservation status
- Least Concern (IUCN 3.1)

Scientific classification
- Kingdom: Plantae
- Clade: Tracheophytes
- Clade: Angiosperms
- Clade: Monocots
- Clade: Commelinids
- Order: Poales
- Family: Cyperaceae
- Genus: Carex
- Species: C. elata

Binomial name
- Carex elata All.

Synonyms
- Carex cespitosa var. elata (All.) Fiori

= Carex elata =

Species of flowering plant in the sedge family

Carex elata (common name, tufted sedge), is a species of tussock-forming, grass-like plant in the Cyperaceae family. It is native to all of Europe, the Atlas Mountains of Africa, Turkey, Iran and Central Asia.

== Description ==
Carex elata is a tussock-forming, evergreen perennial, growing to 1.2 m (4ft) by 1.5 m (5ft). Foliage is bright gold, with green margins. It flowers from May to June, and seeds ripen from July to August. The species is monoecious (individual flowers are either male or female, but both sexes can be found on the same plant).

Its cultivar 'Aurea' has gained the Royal Horticultural Society's Award of Garden Merit.

== Distribution and habitat ==
Carex elata grows best in nutrient-rich, wetland conditions, such as marshes, fens, wet woods, and shallow water margins.

== Subspecies ==
The following subspecies are currently accepted:

- Carex elata subsp. elata
- Carex elata subsp. omskiana (Meinsh.) Jalas (synonym: Carex omskiana Meinsh.)
