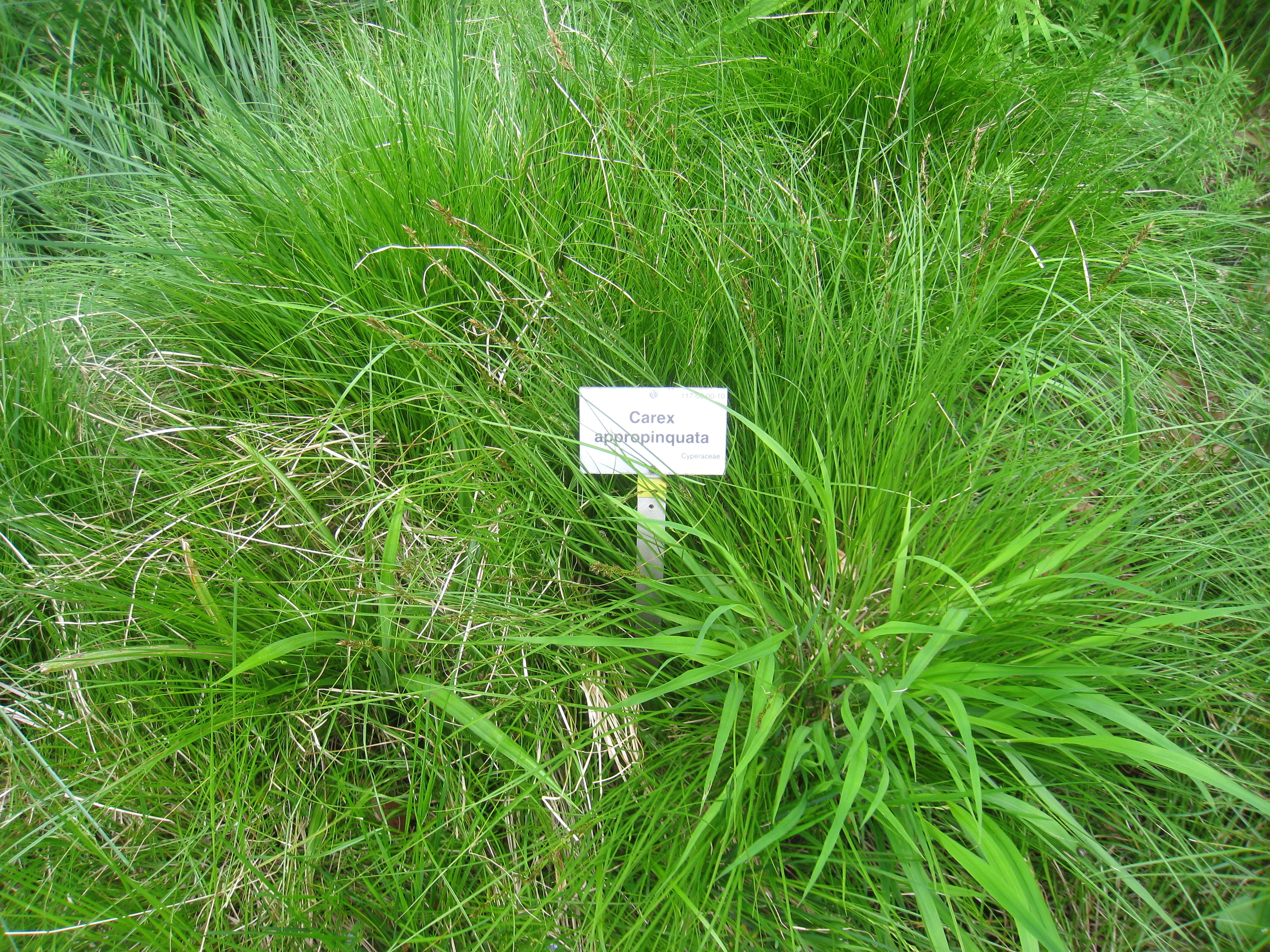

Scientific classification
- Kingdom: Plantae
- Clade: Tracheophytes
- Clade: Angiosperms
- Clade: Monocots
- Clade: Commelinids
- Order: Poales
- Family: Cyperaceae
- Genus: Carex
- Species: C. appropinquata

Binomial name
- Carex appropinquata Schumach.

Synonyms
- Carex paniculata var. paradoxa (Rchb.) Fiori; Carex paradoxa Willd.; Carex paradoxa forma brachystachya Schatz; Carex paradoxa forma sparsiflora Lange; Caricina paradoxa (Rchb.) St.-Lag.; Vignea appropinquata (Schumach.) Soják; Vignea paradoxa Rchb.

= Carex appropinquata =

Species of grass-like plant

Carex appropinquata, known as fibrous tussock-sedge, is a species of flowering plant in the family Cyperaceae, commonly known as sedges.
