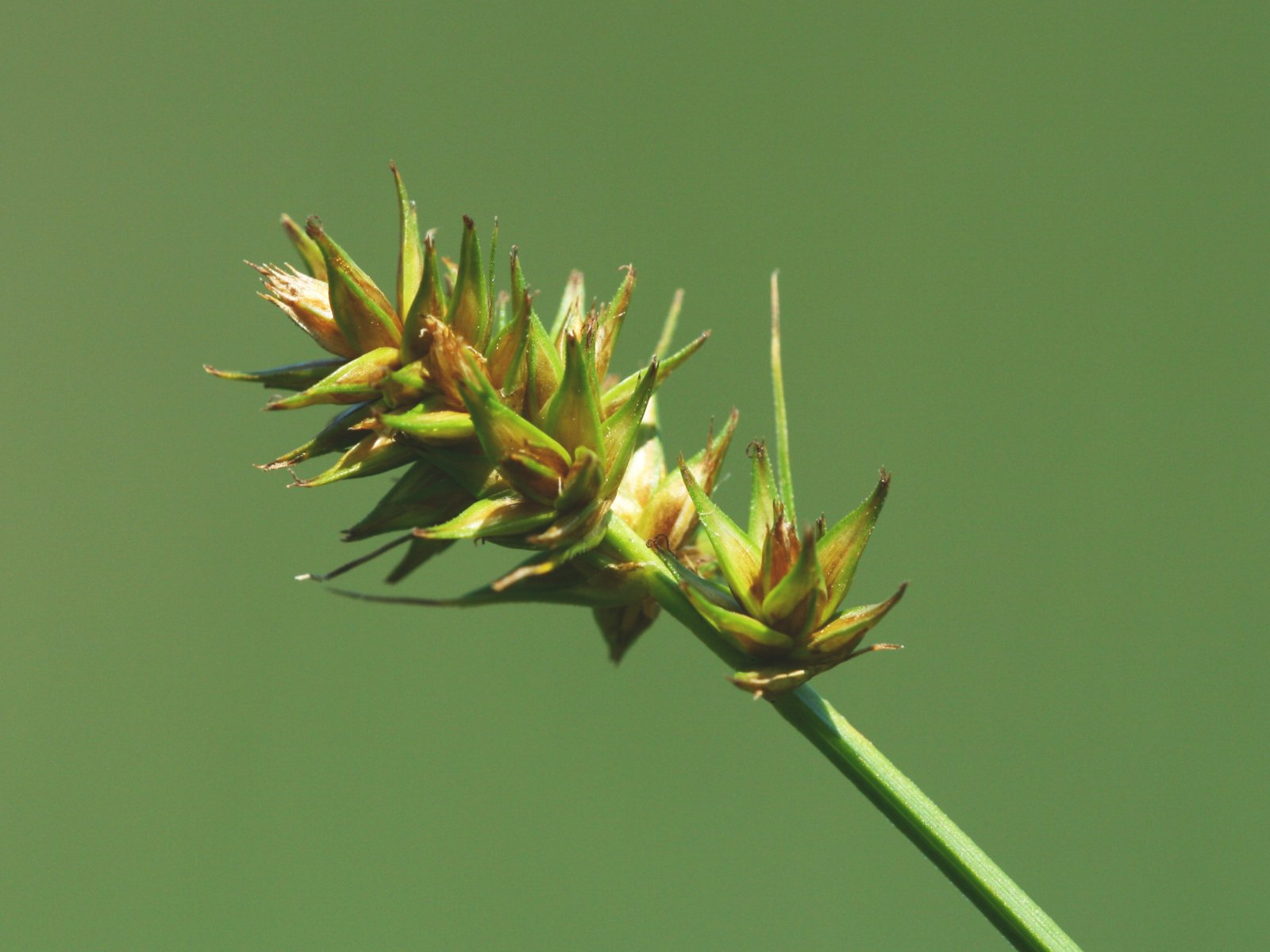

Conservation status
- Least Concern (IUCN 3.1)

Scientific classification
- Kingdom: Plantae
- Clade: Tracheophytes
- Clade: Angiosperms
- Clade: Monocots
- Clade: Commelinids
- Order: Poales
- Family: Cyperaceae
- Genus: Carex
- Species: C. otrubae

Binomial name
- Carex otrubae Podp.

= Carex otrubae =

Species of grass-like plant

Carex otrubae, the false fox-sedge, is a species of flowering plant in the sedge family, Cyperaceae.

== Description ==
It grows 40–70 centimetres (16–28 in) tall with the leaves being linear and 3–7 millimetres (0.12–0.28 in) wide. Both inflorescence and lanceolate are 5 centimetres (2.0 in) long. Its utricles are either pale green or orange-brown. Female specimens have pale orange-brown glumes which are ovate and are 3 millimetres (0.12 in) in length.

== Distribution and habitat ==
This species occurs in Europe, Central Asia, West Siberia, and Xinjiang, China. It thrives in wetlands on heavy soils and especially in lowland areas and can be found near lakes, rivers and reservoirs, as well as coastal areas.
