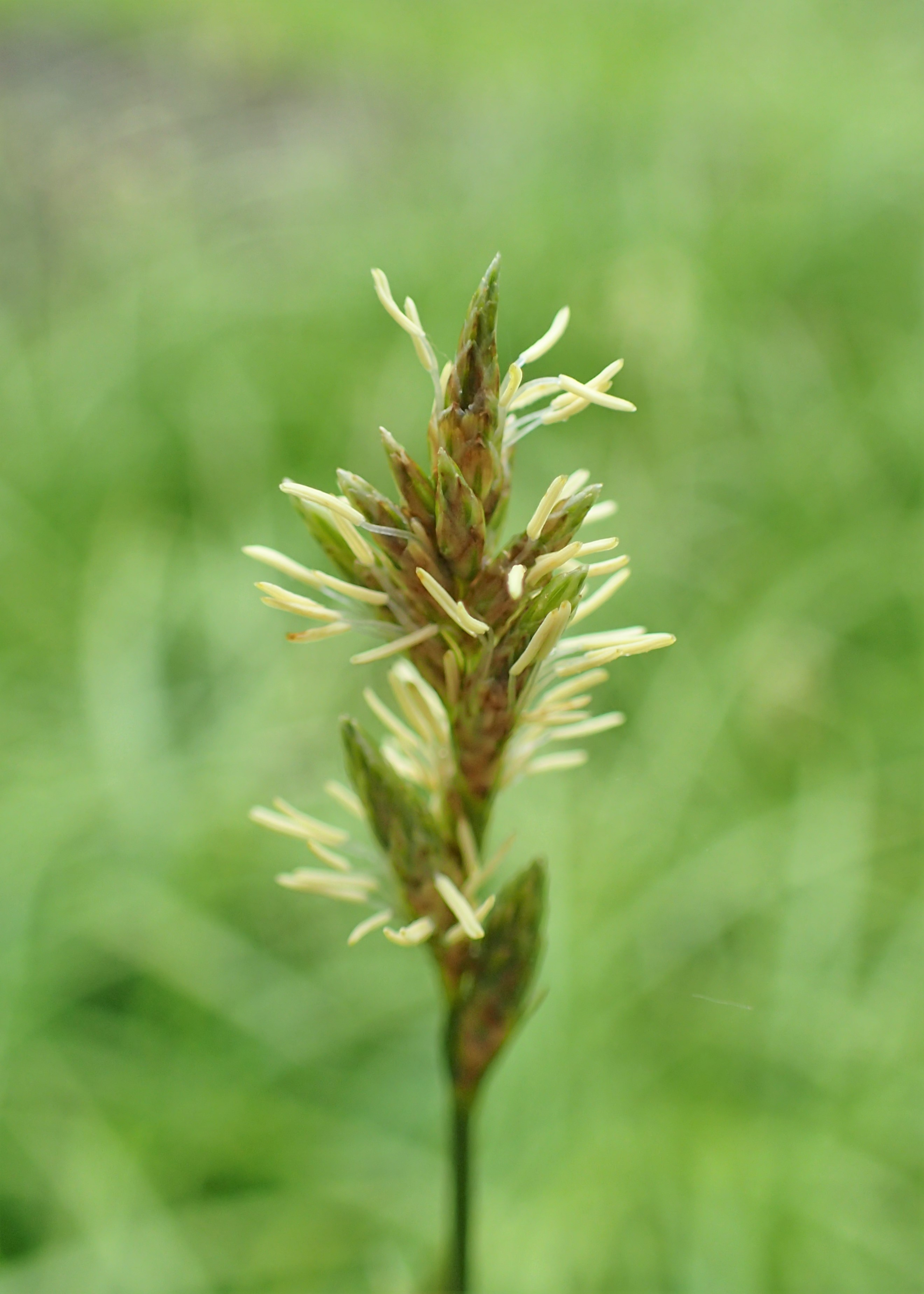
- Inflorescence
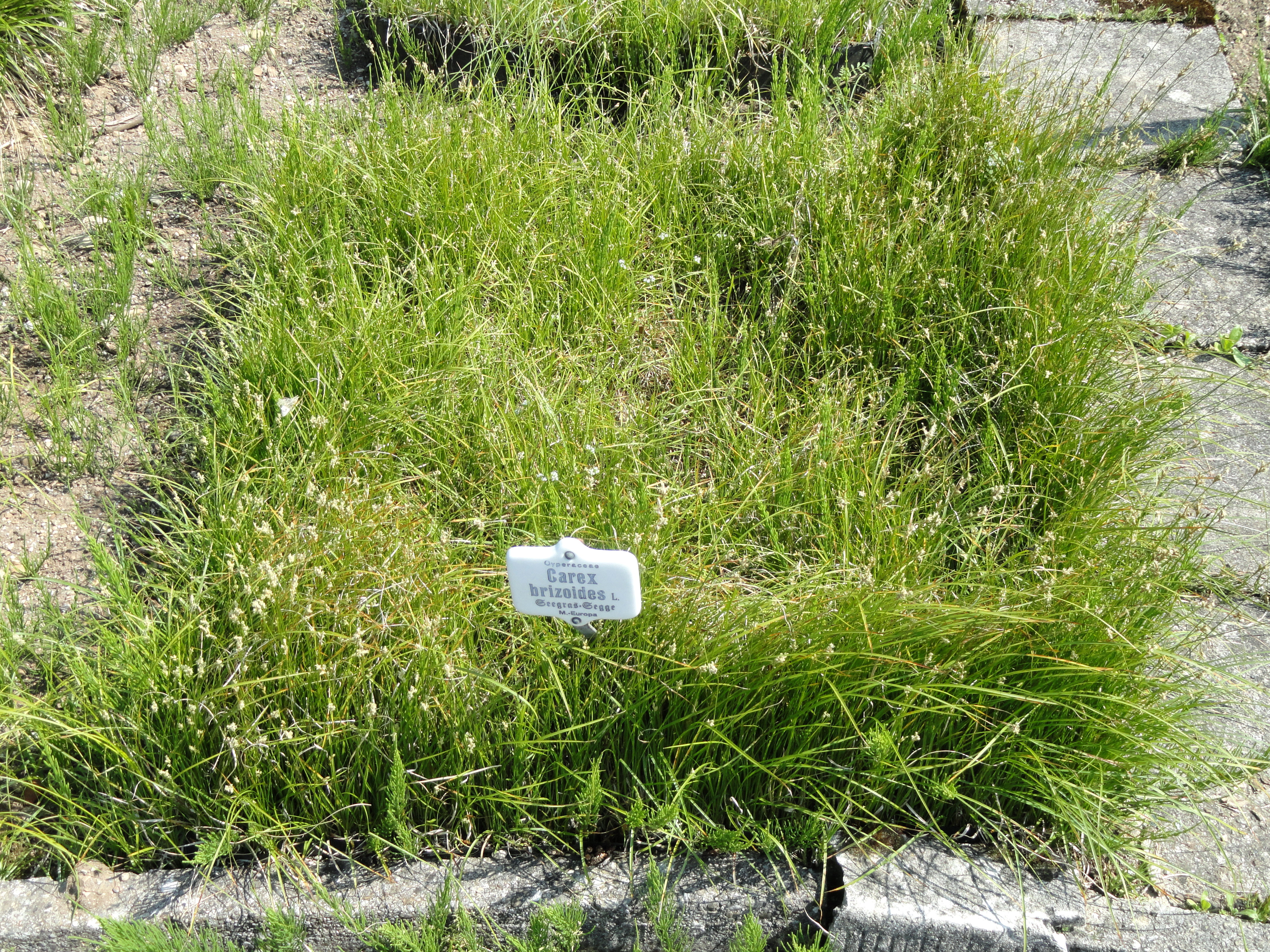
- At the Botanical Garden Munich-Nymphenburg

Scientific classification
- Kingdom: Plantae
- Clade: Tracheophytes
- Clade: Angiosperms
- Clade: Monocots
- Clade: Commelinids
- Order: Poales
- Family: Cyperaceae
- Genus: Carex
- Species: C. brizoides

Binomial name
- Carex brizoides L.

Synonyms
- List: Carex enervis Dulac; Carex praecox J.Jundz.; Carex psammophila Schur; Caricina brizoidea (L.) St.-Lag.; Vignea brizoides (L.) Rchb.; Vignea psammophila Schur; Vignea pseudobrizoides Schur; Vignea pseudoschreberi Schur

= Carex brizoides =

Species of grass-like plant

Carex brizoides, the quaking sedge or quaking-grass sedge, is a species in the genus Carex, native to central and southern Europe. Even where it is a native species, in disturbed woodlands it tends to behave invasively, forming a thick layer on the forest floor and reducing species diversity.

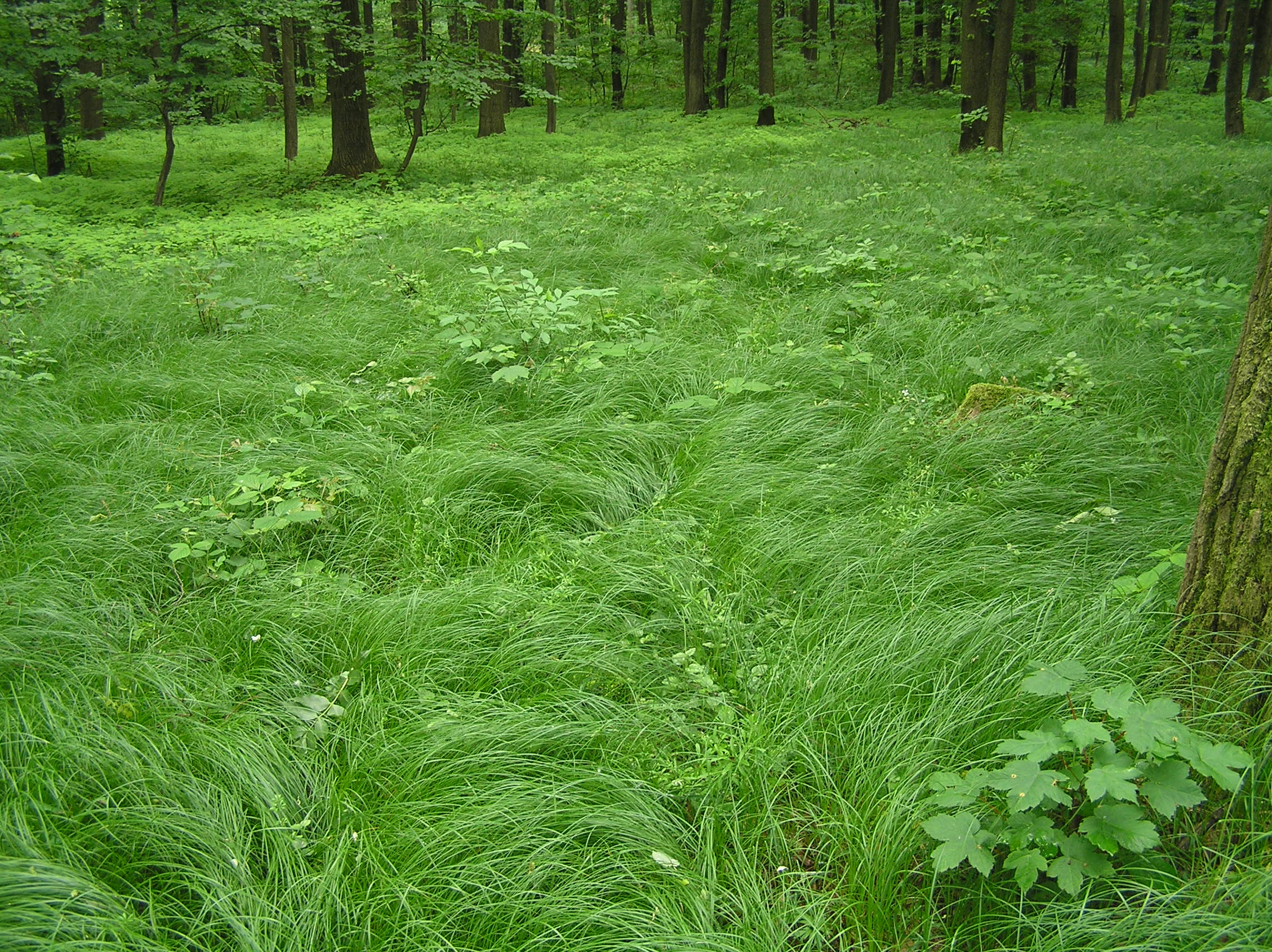
A dense stand
