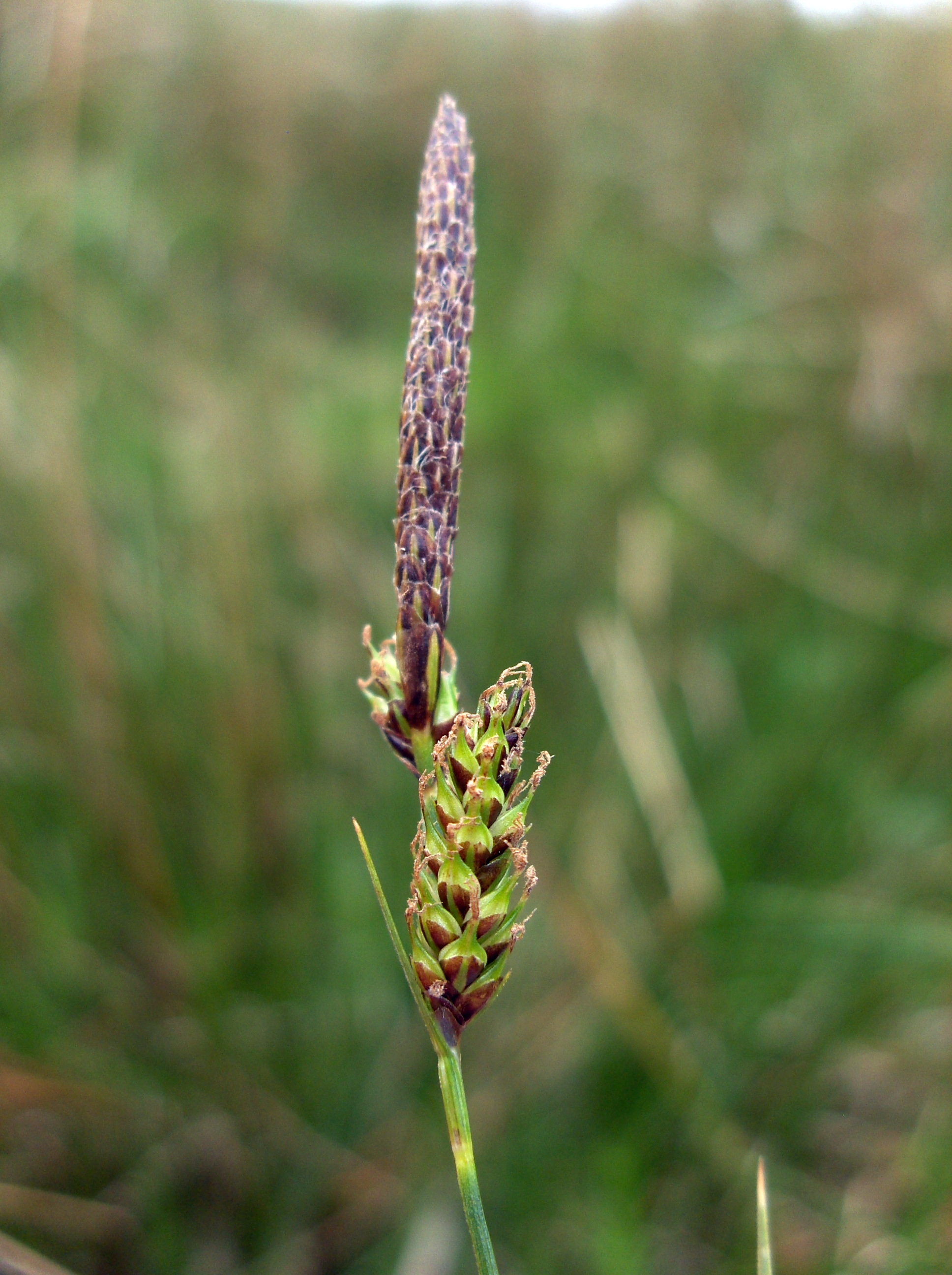
- Carex binervis

Scientific classification
- Kingdom: Plantae
- Clade: Embryophytes
- Clade: Tracheophytes
- Clade: Spermatophytes
- Clade: Angiosperms
- Clade: Monocots
- Clade: Commelinids
- Order: Poales
- Family: Cyperaceae
- Genus: Carex
- Subgenus: Carex subg. Carex
- Section: Carex sect. Spirostachyae (Drejer) L. H. Bailey in J. M. Coulter

Subsections
- C. subsect. Elatae; C. subsect. Spirostachyae

= Carex sect. Spirostachyae =

Group of sedges

Carex sect. Spirostachyae is a section of the genus Carex, containing 38 species of sedge. Species in Carex sect. Spirostachyae share a suite of features, including the short internodes of the primary rhizomes, the presence of an antiligule, the leaf-like, sheathing bract at the base of the inflorescence, the presence of three stigmas in female flowers, and the shape of the seeds.

The section is composed of two subsections, with differing edaphic preferences; subsection Elatae comprises species that lives on acidic soils, while those in subsection Spirostachyae live on basic or ultramafic soils. The two sections also differ morphologically, with species in subsection Elatae having wider leaves, thicker stems and larger spikes, the lowest of which may hang downwards.

The centre of diversity of the group is in Europe and adjacent parts of Africa and Asia; a few species occur in Australia, Africa, South America and on oceanic islands. The three species present in North America are introductions.

Subsection Elatae (Kük.) Luceño & M. Escudero

- Carex aethiopica Schkuhr – South Africa
- Carex binervis Sm. – western Europe
- Carex borbonica Lam. – Mascarene Islands
- Carex boryana Schkuhr – Mascarene Islands
- Carex camposii Boiss. & Reut. – southern Spain
- Carex catharinensis Boeck. – southeastern Brazil
- Carex clavata Thunb. – South Africa
- Carex cyrtosaccus C. B. Clarke – Tanzania, Malawi
- Carex elgonensis Nelmes – Mount Elgon
- Carex fischeri K. Schum. – central Africa
- Carex fissirostris Ball – Atlas Mountains, Morocco
- Carex fuscula d'Urv. – Chile, Argentina
- Carex gunniana Boot. – southeastern Australia
- Carex helodes Link – southern Spain and Portugal, northern Morocco
- Carex hochstetteriana J. Gay ex Seub. – Azores
- Carex laevigata Sm. – western Europe, Morocco
- Carex petitiana A. Rich. – central Africa
- Carex lowei Bech. – Madeira
- Carex mairii Coss. & Germ. – France, Spain, northern Morocco
- Carex mannii E. A. Bruce – central Africa
- Carex mildbraediana Kük. – Rwanda, Burundi, Kenya
- Carex modesti M.Escudero, Martín-Bravo & Jim.Mejías – Tanzania
- Carex paulo-vargasii Luceño & Marín – Morocco
- Carex perraudieriana J. Gay – Canary Islands
- Carex punctata Gaud. – Europe, Morocco, western Asia
- Carex simensis Hochst. ex A. Rich. – central Africa
- Carex thouarsii Carmich. – Tristan da Cunha
- Carex vallis-rosetto K. Schum. – Kenya, Tanzania

Subsection Spirostachyae

- Carex blakei Nelmes – southeastern Australia
- Carex burchelliana Boeck. – South Africa
- Carex diluta M. Bieb. – central and western Asia
- Carex distans L. – Europe, North Africa, central and western Asia
- Carex ecklonii Nees – South Africa
- Carex extensa Good. – Europe and Mediterranean Basin
- Carex idaea Greuter et al. – Crete
- Carex lainzii Luceño, E. Rico & T. Romero – central Spain
- Carex tasmanica Kük. – Tasmania
- Carex troodi Turril – Cyprus
- Carex vixdentata (Kük.) G. A. Wheeler – South America
