= Carex spadicea =

Carex spadicea can refer to the following sedge species:

- Carex spadicea Roth, a synonym of Carex acutiformis Ehrh.
- Carex spadicea Gilib., a synonym of Carex arenaria L.
- Carex spadicea J.F.Gmel., a synonym of Carex ferruginea Scop.
- Carex spadicea Host, also a synonym of Carex ferruginea Scop.
- Carex spadicea Schkuhr, a synonym of Carex frigida All.
