= Carex iynx =

Scientific classification
- Kingdom: Plantae
- Clade: Tracheophytes
- Clade: Angiosperms
- Clade: Monocots
- Clade: Commelinids
- Order: Poales
- Family: Cyperaceae
- Genus: Carex
- Species: C. iynx

Binomial name
- Carex iynx Nelmes

Species of flowering plant

Carex iynx, the tussock sedge (a name it shares with other members of its genus), is a species of flowering plant in the family Cyperaceae, native to South Australia, New South Wales, Victoria, and Tasmania in Australia, and introduced to the North Island of New Zealand.

== Description ==
It superficially resembles Carex tasmanica, the curly sedge. It can grow up to 40 centimeters. The leaves are larger than the stems. The sheaths color is dark yellowish-brown. The flower color is pale yellow-brown. The bloom period is from September and April.
