= Carex × adulterina =

Scientific classification
- Kingdom: Plantae
- Clade: Tracheophytes
- Clade: Angiosperms
- Clade: Monocots
- Clade: Commelinids
- Order: Poales
- Family: Cyperaceae
- Genus: Carex
- Species: C. × adulterina

Binomial name
- Carex × adulterina Chenevard

Hybrid sedge in the family Cyperaceae

Carex × adulterina is a hybrid species of sedge in the family Cyperaceae. It is the hybrid between Carex oederi and Carex punctata. The hybrid is accepted by Plants of the World Online and has a native range given as Central Europe, with Switzerland specifically recorded in its distribution.

== Description ==
Carex × adulterina is a perennial or rhizomatous geophyte, as are many members of the genus Carex. As a hybrid, it combines characteristics inherited from its two parent species, C. oederi and C. punctata. Individuals may therefore show intermediate morphological features between the parents.

Detailed diagnostic measurements and a formal morphological description should be based on the original description by Chenevard or subsequent European Carex treatments rather than inferred from the characteristics of the parent species.

== Taxonomy ==
The hybrid was described by the Swiss botanist Auguste Chenevard in 1902. The original publication is cited as Bulletin de l'Herbier Boissier, series 2, volume 2, page 781 (1902).

The hybrid formula is:

Carex oederi × Carex punctata

The multiplication sign (×) in the name indicates that C. × adulterina is a hybrid rather than a species arising from a single parental lineage.

== Distribution ==
Carex × adulterina has a reported native range in Central Europe. Plants of the World Online specifically records it from Switzerland. Its occurrence is expected to be associated with areas where its two parent species grow together, although the available sources do not establish a comprehensive modern distribution for the hybrid.

The hybrid has also been recorded in European botanical databases outside the Kew distribution record; however, individual occurrence records should be distinguished from a formally established geographic range.

== Habitat and ecology ==
As a hybrid of Carex oederi and Carex punctata, C. × adulterina is associated with habitats suitable for its parent taxa. Its occurrence is likely to depend on the simultaneous presence of both parental species and suitable wet or moist habitats.

The available taxonomic sources classify the hybrid as a perennial or rhizomatous geophyte and place it primarily in the temperate biome.

== See also ==
- List of Carex species
- Carex oederi
- Carex punctata
