= Carex helvetica =

Carex helvetica can refer to the following sedge species:

- Carex helvetica Honck., a synonym of Carex frigida All.
- Carex helvetica Schleich. ex Kunth, a synonym of Carex punctata Gaudin
