= Carex hubbardii =

Scientific classification
- Kingdom: Plantae
- Clade: Tracheophytes
- Clade: Angiosperms
- Clade: Monocots
- Clade: Commelinids
- Order: Poales
- Family: Cyperaceae
- Genus: Carex
- Species: C. hubbardii

Binomial name
- Carex hubbardii Nelmes

Species of grass-like plant

Carex hubbardii is a sedge of the Cyperaceae family that is native to north eastern parts of Australia in the states of Queensland and New South Wales. It has also been introduced to parts of Great Britain.

== See also ==
- List of Carex species
