= Carex papillosissima =

Scientific classification
- Kingdom: Plantae
- Clade: Tracheophytes
- Clade: Angiosperms
- Clade: Monocots
- Clade: Commelinids
- Order: Poales
- Family: Cyperaceae
- Genus: Carex
- Species: C. papillosissima

Binomial name
- Carex papillosissima Nelmes

Species of grass-like plant

Carex papillosissima is a sedge of the Cyperaceae family that is native to tropical parts of Africa in Tanzania and the Democratic Republic of the Congo.

== See also ==
- List of Carex species
