= Carex eluta =

Scientific classification
- Kingdom: Plantae
- Clade: Tracheophytes
- Clade: Angiosperms
- Clade: Monocots
- Clade: Commelinids
- Order: Poales
- Family: Cyperaceae
- Genus: Carex
- Species: C. eluta

Binomial name
- Carex eluta Nelmes

Species of grass-like plant

Carex eluta is a sedge of the Cyperaceae family that is native to India.

== See also ==
- List of Carex species
