= Carex ballsii =

Scientific classification
- Kingdom: Plantae
- Clade: Tracheophytes
- Clade: Angiosperms
- Clade: Monocots
- Clade: Commelinids
- Order: Poales
- Family: Cyperaceae
- Genus: Carex
- Species: C. ballsii

Binomial name
- Carex ballsii Nelmes

Species of grass-like plant

Carex ballsii is a sedge that is native to southern parts of Mexico.

== See also ==
- List of Carex species
