= Carex hypsobates =

Scientific classification
- Kingdom: Plantae
- Clade: Tracheophytes
- Clade: Angiosperms
- Clade: Monocots
- Clade: Commelinids
- Order: Poales
- Family: Cyperaceae
- Genus: Carex
- Species: C. hypsobates

Binomial name
- Carex hypsobates Nelmes

Species of grass-like plant

Carex hypsobates is a sedge of the Cyperaceae family that is native to the Western Himalayas.

== See also ==
- List of Carex species
