= Carex diplodon =

Scientific classification
- Kingdom: Plantae
- Clade: Embryophytes
- Clade: Tracheophytes
- Clade: Spermatophytes
- Clade: Angiosperms
- Clade: Monocots
- Clade: Commelinids
- Order: Poales
- Family: Cyperaceae
- Genus: Carex
- Species: C. diplodon

Binomial name
- Carex diplodon Nelmes

Species of grass-like plant

Carex diplodon is a sedge that is native to northern parts of central China.

The sedge has a short rhizome and smooth and obtusely trigonous culms that typically grow to a height of 19 to 22 cm (7.5 to 8.7 in). The linear leaves are usually longer than the culms and a 3 to 5 mm (0.12 to 0.20 in) wide.

== See also ==
- List of Carex species
