= Carex coriogyne =

Scientific classification
- Kingdom: Plantae
- Clade: Tracheophytes
- Clade: Angiosperms
- Clade: Monocots
- Clade: Commelinids
- Order: Poales
- Family: Cyperaceae
- Genus: Carex
- Species: C. coriogyne

Binomial name
- Carex coriogyne Nelmes

Species of grass-like plant

Carex coriogyne is a sedge that is native to Turkey.

== See also ==
- List of Carex species
