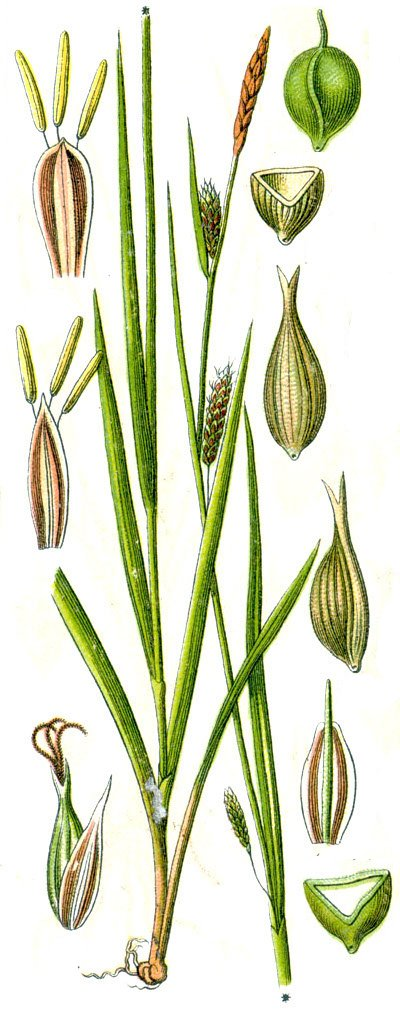

Scientific classification
- Kingdom: Plantae
- Clade: Tracheophytes
- Clade: Angiosperms
- Clade: Monocots
- Clade: Commelinids
- Order: Poales
- Family: Cyperaceae
- Genus: Carex
- Section: Carex sect. Spirostachyae
- Species: C. laevigata

Binomial name
- Carex laevigata Sm.

= Carex laevigata =

Species of grass-like plant

Carex laevigata, the smooth-stalked sedge, is a species of sedge. It lives in moist, shady environment in the lowlands of Western and Central Europe, particularly in alder–ash woodland. It is distinguished from similar species, such as C. binervis and C. distans by the presence of tiny red dots on the utricles. Carex laevigata was first described by James Edward Smith in 1800, in a paper in the journal Transactions of the Linnean Society of London.
