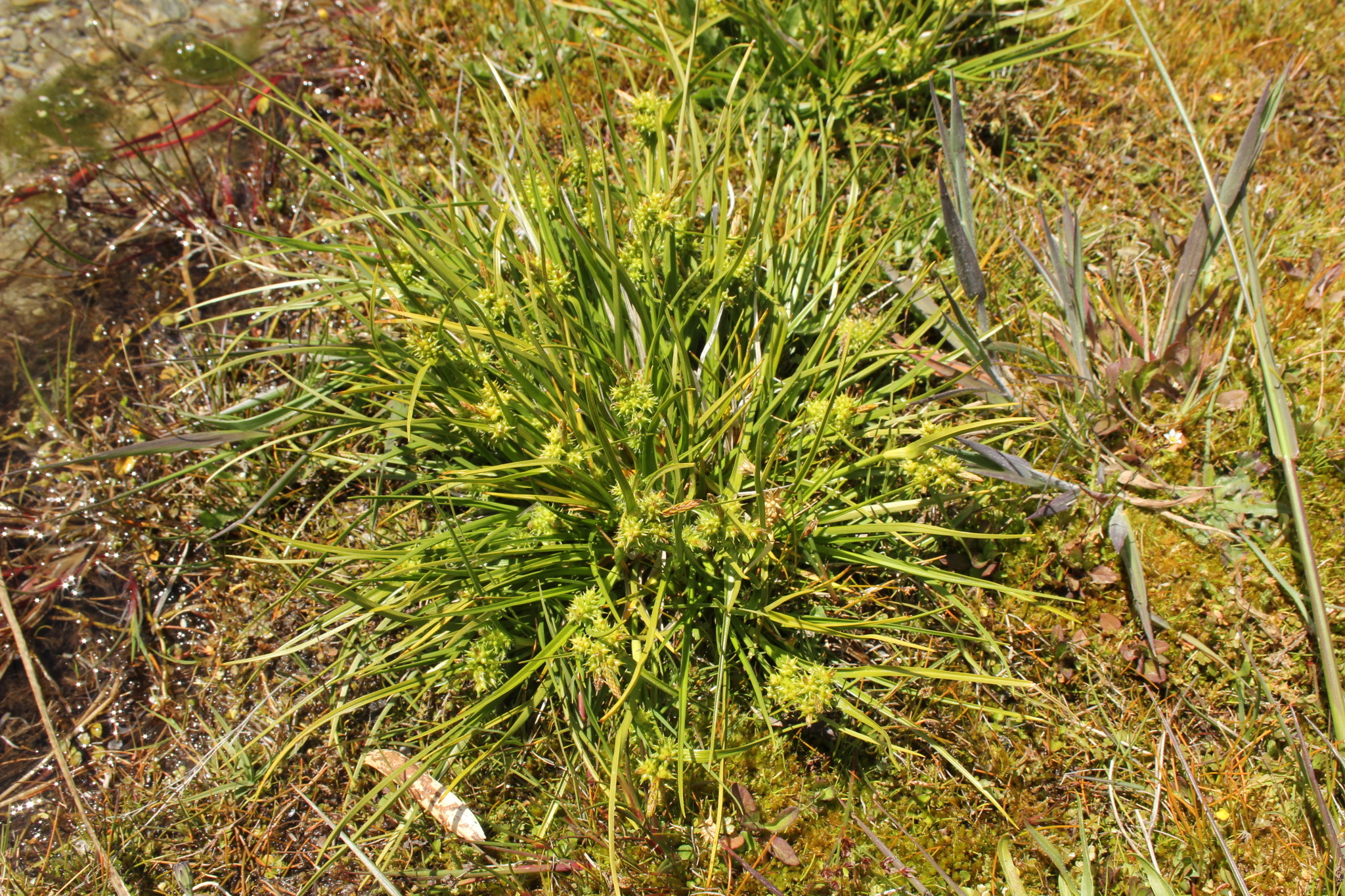

Conservation status
- Not Threatened (NZ TCS)

Scientific classification
- Kingdom: Plantae
- Clade: Tracheophytes
- Clade: Angiosperms
- Clade: Monocots
- Clade: Commelinids
- Order: Poales
- Family: Cyperaceae
- Genus: Carex
- Species: C. flaviformis

Binomial name
- Carex flaviformis Nelmes

= Carex flaviformis =

Species of grass-like plant

Carex flaviformis is a sedge of the Cyperaceae family that is native to southern parts of the North Island and throughout the South Island of New Zealand.

== See also ==
- List of Carex species
