= Carex cataphyllodes =

Scientific classification
- Kingdom: Plantae
- Clade: Tracheophytes
- Clade: Angiosperms
- Clade: Monocots
- Clade: Commelinids
- Order: Poales
- Family: Cyperaceae
- Genus: Carex
- Species: C. cataphyllodes

Binomial name
- Carex cataphyllodes Nelmes

Species of grass-like plant

Carex cataphyllodes is a sedge that is native to Thailand.

== See also ==
- List of Carex species
