= Carex inversonervosa =

Scientific classification
- Kingdom: Plantae
- Clade: Tracheophytes
- Clade: Angiosperms
- Clade: Monocots
- Clade: Commelinids
- Order: Poales
- Family: Cyperaceae
- Genus: Carex
- Species: C. inversonervosa

Binomial name
- Carex inversonervosa Nelmes

Species of grass-like plant

Carex inversonervosa is a sedge of the Cyperaceae family that is native to New Caledonia.

== See also ==
- List of Carex species
