= Carex tavoyensis =

Scientific classification
- Kingdom: Plantae
- Clade: Tracheophytes
- Clade: Angiosperms
- Clade: Monocots
- Clade: Commelinids
- Order: Poales
- Family: Cyperaceae
- Genus: Carex
- Species: C. tavoyensis

Binomial name
- Carex tavoyensis Nelmes

Species of grass-like plant

Carex tavoyensis is a sedge of the Cyperaceae family that is native to tropical parts of Asia in Vietnam.

== See also ==
- List of Carex species
