= Carex macrophyllidion =

Scientific classification
- Kingdom: Plantae
- Clade: Tracheophytes
- Clade: Angiosperms
- Clade: Monocots
- Clade: Commelinids
- Order: Poales
- Family: Cyperaceae
- Genus: Carex
- Species: C. macrophyllidion

Binomial name
- Carex macrophyllidion Nelmes

Species of grass-like plant

Carex macrophyllidion is a sedge of the Cyperaceae family that is native to tropical parts of central Africa from the Democratic Republic of the Congo in the west to Tanzania in the east.

== See also ==
- List of Carex species
