= Carex lageniformis =

Scientific classification
- Kingdom: Plantae
- Clade: Tracheophytes
- Clade: Angiosperms
- Clade: Monocots
- Clade: Commelinids
- Order: Poales
- Family: Cyperaceae
- Genus: Carex
- Species: C. lageniformis

Binomial name
- Carex lageniformis Nelmes

Species of grass-like plant

Carex lageniformis is a sedge of the Cyperaceae family that is native to tropical parts of Thailand.

C. lageniformis is a perennial and rhizomatous sedge with smooth culms that have a triangular cross section and are typically 5 to 30 cm (2.0 to 11.8 in) in length and 0.5 to 1 mm (0.020 to 0.039 in) wide. The leaves have a flat and linear shape and are 4 to 7 mm (0.16 to 0.28 in) wide and 20 to 40 cm (7.9 to 15.7 in) long with a pointed end.

== See also ==
- List of Carex species
