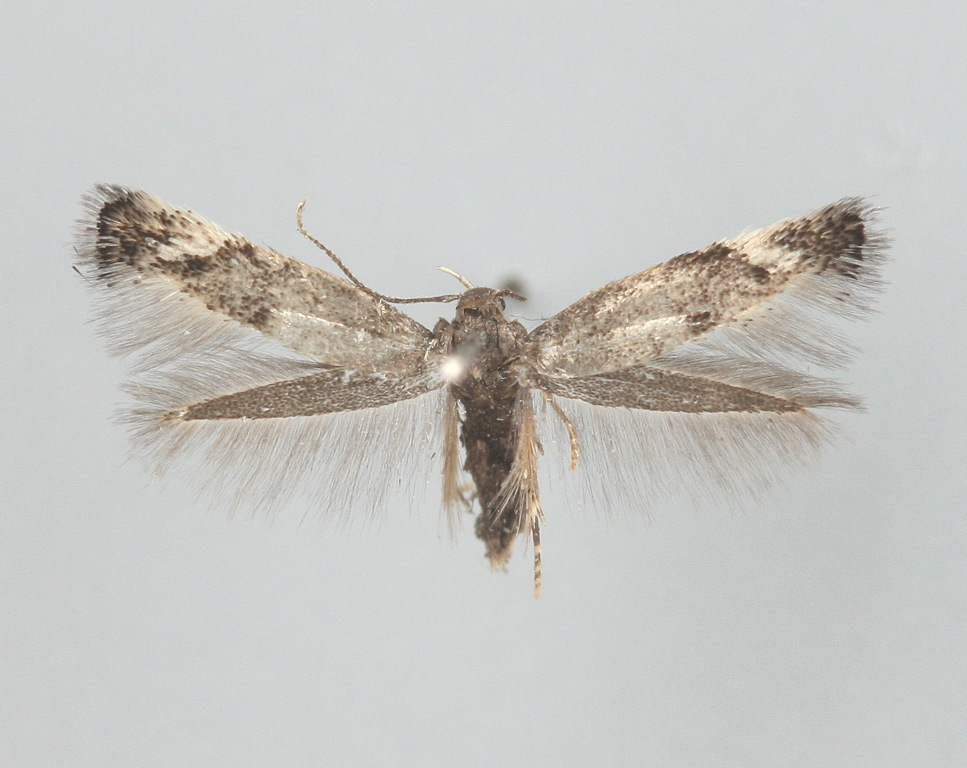
- Female

Scientific classification
- Kingdom: Animalia
- Phylum: Arthropoda
- Class: Insecta
- Order: Lepidoptera
- Family: Elachistidae
- Genus: Elachista
- Species: E. serricornis

Binomial name
- Elachista serricornis Stainton, 1854

= Elachista serricornis =

Species of moth

Elachista serricornis is a moth of the family Elachistidae found in Europe.

== Description ==
The wingspan is 7–8 millimetres (0.28–0.31 in). The head is grey, the face whitish. Forewings in males are grey, in females blackish-grey; plical stigma black, elongate, followed by a white dot; an oblique white triangular costal spot at 2/3; a small indistinct whitish tornal spot somewhat beyond it. Hindwings grey. grey.

== Biology ==
The larvae feed on Carex elata, rare spring sedge (Carex ericetorum), Carex ferruginea, wood sedge (Carex sylvatica), bladder sedge (Carex vesicaria), common cottongrass (Eriophorum angustifolium), Eriophorum latifolium, hare's-tail cottongrass (Eriophorum vaginatum) and Scirpus sylvaticus.

== Distribution ==
It is found from Fennoscandia and northern Russia to northern Italy and from Ireland to Poland and Hungary.
