= Carex variegata =

Carex variegata can refer to the following sedge species:

- Carex variegata Scheele, a synonym of Carex barrattii Torr. ex Schwein.
- Carex variegata Lam., a synonym of Carex frigida All.
