= Carex craspedotricha =

Scientific classification
- Kingdom: Plantae
- Clade: Tracheophytes
- Clade: Angiosperms
- Clade: Monocots
- Clade: Commelinids
- Order: Poales
- Family: Cyperaceae
- Genus: Carex
- Species: C. craspedotricha

Binomial name
- Carex craspedotricha Nelmes

Species of grass-like plant

Carex craspedotricha is a sedge of the Cyperaceae family that is native to northern parts of China and has been introduced to tropical parts of Thailand.

The grass like plant has a stiff rhizome or horizontal underground stem. It has smooth and soft tufted culms that are 30 to 55 cm (12 to 22 in) in length. The flat, soft and linear leaves are shorter than the culms and have width of 2 to 3 mm (0.079 to 0.118 in).

== See also ==
- List of Carex species
