= Carex praeclara =

Scientific classification
- Kingdom: Plantae
- Clade: Tracheophytes
- Clade: Angiosperms
- Clade: Monocots
- Clade: Commelinids
- Order: Poales
- Family: Cyperaceae
- Genus: Carex
- Species: C. praeclara

Binomial name
- Carex praeclara Nelmes

Species of grass-like plant

Carex praeclara is a sedge of the Cyperaceae family that is native to temperate and tropical parts of Asia in south central parts of China, Tibet and the East Himalaya.

C. praeclara is a tufted grass-like plant with a thick creeping rhizome. It has rigid culms with a triangular cross section that are typically 20 to 30 cm (7.9 to 11.8 in) in length and are surrounded by purplish-brown sheaths at the base. The flat and linear leaves are usually shorted than the culms and have a width of 3 to 5 mm (0.12 to 0.20 in) and have a pointed tip.

== See also ==
- List of Carex species
