= Carex borii =

Scientific classification
- Kingdom: Plantae
- Clade: Tracheophytes
- Clade: Angiosperms
- Clade: Monocots
- Clade: Commelinids
- Order: Poales
- Family: Cyperaceae
- Genus: Carex
- Species: C. borii

Binomial name
- Carex borii Nelmes

Species of grass-like plant

Carex borii is a sedge that is native to Pakistan and Tajikistan.

== See also ==
- List of Carex species
