= Carex pergracilis =

Scientific classification
- Kingdom: Plantae
- Clade: Tracheophytes
- Clade: Angiosperms
- Clade: Monocots
- Clade: Commelinids
- Order: Poales
- Family: Cyperaceae
- Genus: Carex
- Species: C. pergracilis

Binomial name
- Carex pergracilis Nelmes

Species of grass-like plant

Carex pergracilis is a sedge of the Cyperaceae family that is native to temperate parts of Asia in southern central China.

== See also ==
- List of Carex species
