= Carex cranaocarpa =

Scientific classification
- Kingdom: Plantae
- Clade: Tracheophytes
- Clade: Angiosperms
- Clade: Monocots
- Clade: Commelinids
- Order: Poales
- Family: Cyperaceae
- Genus: Carex
- Species: C. cranaocarpa

Binomial name
- Carex cranaocarpa Nelmes

Species of grass-like plant

Carex cranaocarpa is a sedge that is native to northern parts of China and inner Mongolia.

The sedge has a woody, oblique rhizome and tufted smooth and trigonous culms that typically grow to a height of 50 to 80 cm (20 to 31 in). The flat and linear leaves are shorter than the culms and a 3 to 3 mm (0.12 to 0.12 in) wide.

== See also ==
- List of Carex species
