= Carex kansuensis =

Scientific classification
- Kingdom: Plantae
- Clade: Tracheophytes
- Clade: Angiosperms
- Clade: Monocots
- Clade: Commelinids
- Order: Poales
- Family: Cyperaceae
- Genus: Carex
- Species: C. kansuensis

Binomial name
- Carex kansuensis Nelmes

Species of grass-like plant

Carex kansuensis is a sedge of the Cyperaceae family that is native to temperate parts of Asia including central parts China and Tibet.

The sedge has a short rhizome and firm trigonous culms that have a length of 45 to 100 cm (18 to 39 in) that are clothed at the base with purple coloured sheaths. The flat, broadly linear shaped leaves are typically shorter than the culms and have a width of 5 to 7 mm (0.20 to 0.28 in).

== See also ==
- List of Carex species
