= Carex phyllocaula =

Scientific classification
- Kingdom: Plantae
- Clade: Tracheophytes
- Clade: Angiosperms
- Clade: Monocots
- Clade: Commelinids
- Order: Poales
- Family: Cyperaceae
- Genus: Carex
- Species: C. phyllocaula

Binomial name
- Carex phyllocaula Nelmes

Species of grass-like plant

Carex phyllocaula is a sedge of the Cyperaceae family that is native to tropical parts of Asia in Thailand.

C. phyllocaula is a perennial sedge with a rhizome. It has a loosely tufted habit with smooth culms that have a triangular cross section and are typically 50 to 60 cm (20 to 24 in) in length and 1 to 1.5 mm (0.039 to 0.059 in) wide. The flat and linear cauline leaves that grow from the base and are green to dark brown in colour with a length of around 30 to 45 cm (12 to 18 in) and a width of 3 to 5 mm (0.12 to 0.20 in).

== See also ==
- List of Carex species
