= Carex pterocaulos =

Scientific classification
- Kingdom: Plantae
- Clade: Tracheophytes
- Clade: Angiosperms
- Clade: Monocots
- Clade: Commelinids
- Order: Poales
- Family: Cyperaceae
- Genus: Carex
- Species: C. pterocaulos

Binomial name
- Carex pterocaulos Nelmes

Species of grass-like plant

Carex pterocaulos is a sedge of the Cyperaceae family that is native to temperate and tropical parts of Asia in south central parts of China, Thailand and Myanmar.

C. pterocaulis is a perennial sedge with a short rhizome and tufted culms. The culms are typically 40 to 45 cm (16 to 18 in) in length and 1.2 to 1.5 mm (0.047 to 0.059 in) in width. The flat and stiff leaves tend to be slightly longer than the culms and are usually 10 to 11 mm (0.39 to 0.43 in) wide and have persistent brown coloured sheaths found at their base.

The sedges are often found in mountainous areas to an elevation of around 1,600 m (5,200 ft).

== See also ==
- List of Carex species
