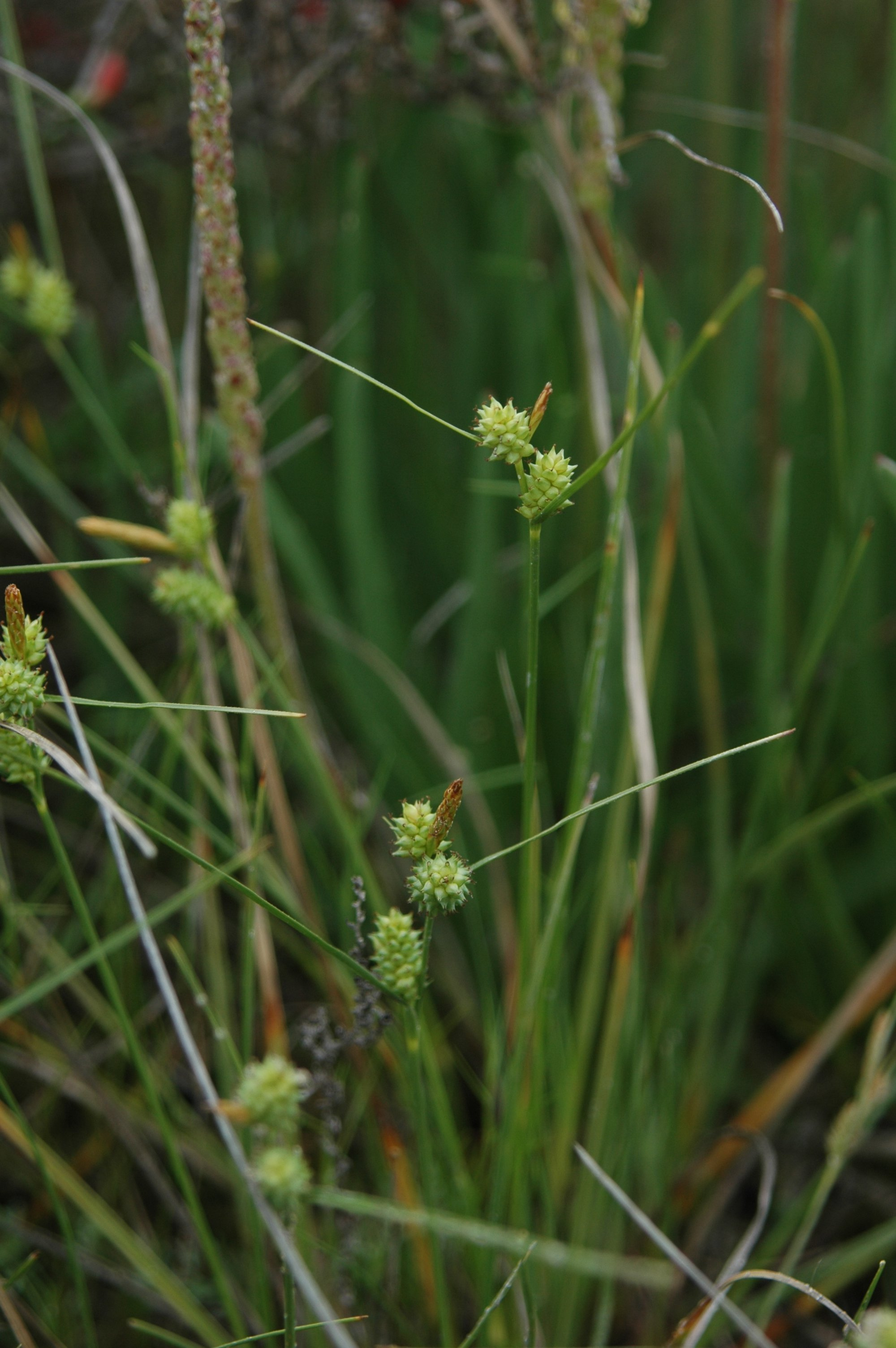

Scientific classification
- Kingdom: Plantae
- Clade: Tracheophytes
- Clade: Angiosperms
- Clade: Monocots
- Clade: Commelinids
- Order: Poales
- Family: Cyperaceae
- Genus: Carex
- Section: Carex sect. Spirostachyae
- Species: C. extensa

Binomial name
- Carex extensa Gooden.

= Carex extensa =

Species of grass-like plant

Carex extensa is a species of sedge known by the common name long-bracted sedge. It is native to Europe, North Africa, and the Middle East.
