= Carex barbata =

Scientific classification
- Kingdom: Plantae
- Clade: Tracheophytes
- Clade: Angiosperms
- Clade: Monocots
- Clade: Commelinids
- Order: Poales
- Family: Cyperaceae
- Genus: Carex
- Species: C. barbata

Binomial name
- Carex barbata Boott

Synonyms
- Carex gunniana var. barbata (Boott) Kük.

Species of grass-like plant

Carex barbata is a Tasmanian species of sedge that was first formally named by Francis Boott in 1858, in his Illustrations of the genus Carex. A specimen collected in February 1839 by R. C. Gunn is the only known collection of this species. In 1909, it was reclassified as a variety of Carex gunniana, but Kew's Plants of the World Online maintains it as a separate species.
