= Carex hebes =

Scientific classification
- Kingdom: Plantae
- Clade: Tracheophytes
- Clade: Angiosperms
- Clade: Monocots
- Clade: Commelinids
- Order: Poales
- Family: Cyperaceae
- Genus: Carex
- Species: C. hebes

Binomial name
- Carex hebes Nelmes

Species of grass-like plant

Carex hebes, also known as dry-land sedge, is a sedge of the Cyperaceae family that is native to south-eastern parts of Australia in the states of Victoria and New South Wales.

== See also ==
- List of Carex species
