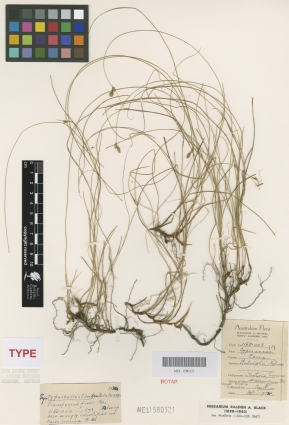

Scientific classification
- Kingdom: Plantae
- Clade: Tracheophytes
- Clade: Angiosperms
- Clade: Monocots
- Clade: Commelinids
- Order: Poales
- Family: Cyperaceae
- Genus: Carex
- Species: C. raleighii

Binomial name
- Carex raleighii Nelmes

= Carex raleighii =

Species of grass-like plant

Carex raleighii, also known as raleighii sedge, is a sedge of the Cyperaceae family that is native to south eastern Australia in New South Wales, Victoria and Tasmania.

C. raleighii is a loosely tufted grass-like plant with a long rhizome. It has smooth, slender and weak culms with a cylindrical to triangular cross section that are 25 to 40 cm (9.8 to 15.7 in) in length and a width of 0.3 to 0.7 mm (0.012 to 0.028 in). The leaves are usually shorter than the culms with a width of around 1 mm (0.039 in) surrounded by a brown sheath. It has erect inflorescences that is 0.5 to 1 cm (0.20 to 0.39 in) in length and is composed of one to four solitary spikes found at the nodes.

== See also ==
- List of Carex species
