= Carex idaea =

Scientific classification
- Kingdom: Plantae
- Clade: Tracheophytes
- Clade: Angiosperms
- Clade: Monocots
- Clade: Commelinids
- Order: Poales
- Family: Cyperaceae
- Genus: Carex
- Species: C. idaea

Binomial name
- Carex idaea Greuter, Matthäs & Risse

Species of flowering plant

Carex idaea is a species of sedge in the family Cyperaceae, native to Crete. It is genetically very close to Carex distans, but has a number of distinct differences, including a higher number of chromosomes (2n = 74), stiffer leaves, and dark red-purple flowers.
