= Carex camposii =

Conservation status
- Least Concern (IUCN 3.1)

Scientific classification
- Kingdom: Plantae
- Clade: Tracheophytes
- Clade: Angiosperms
- Clade: Monocots
- Clade: Commelinids
- Order: Poales
- Family: Cyperaceae
- Genus: Carex
- Species: C. camposii

Binomial name
- Carex camposii Boiss. & Reut. (1852)

Synonyms
- Carex laevigata Boiss. (1842).

Species of plant

Carex camposii is a tussock-forming species of perennial sedge in the family Cyperaceae. It is endemic to southern Spain.

== See also ==
- List of Carex species
