= Carex catharinensis =

Scientific classification
- Kingdom: Plantae
- Clade: Tracheophytes
- Clade: Angiosperms
- Clade: Monocots
- Clade: Commelinids
- Order: Poales
- Family: Cyperaceae
- Genus: Carex
- Species: C. catharinensis

Binomial name
- Carex catharinensis Boeckeler

Species of plant

Carex catharinensis is a tussock-forming species of perennial sedge in the family Cyperaceae. It is native to parts of eastern parts of South America.

The sedge has a short rhizome and forms can form a dense turf with many stems from the same root. It has stems with a triangular cross-section and a rough texture. The leaves can be flat or have a corrugated appearance.

The species was first formally described by the botanist Johann Otto Boeckeler in 1896 as a part of the work Allgemeine Botanische Zeitschrift für Systematik, Floristik, Pflanzengeographie. It has one synonym; Carex fuscula subsp. catharinensis.

It is situated in subtropical biomes from southern and south eastern Brazil through Uruguay and northern Argentina.

== See also ==
- List of Carex species
