= Carex gunniana =

Scientific classification
- Kingdom: Plantae
- Clade: Tracheophytes
- Clade: Angiosperms
- Clade: Monocots
- Clade: Commelinids
- Order: Poales
- Family: Cyperaceae
- Genus: Carex
- Species: C. gunniana

Binomial name
- Carex gunniana Boott

Synonyms
- Carex gunniana var. brevior Kük.

Species of grass-like plant

Carex gunniana is an Australia species of sedge that was first described in 1845 by Boott in the Proceedings of the Linnean Society of London. It is native to eastern Australia and Tasmania.

Two varieties have been named, both in 1909 by Georg Kükenthal. As of 2020, the Tasmanian endemic Carex gunniana var. barbata is maintained as a separate species, Carex barbata, in Kew's Plants of the World Online, and C. gunniana var. brevior is not accepted as a separate taxon than C. gunniana.
