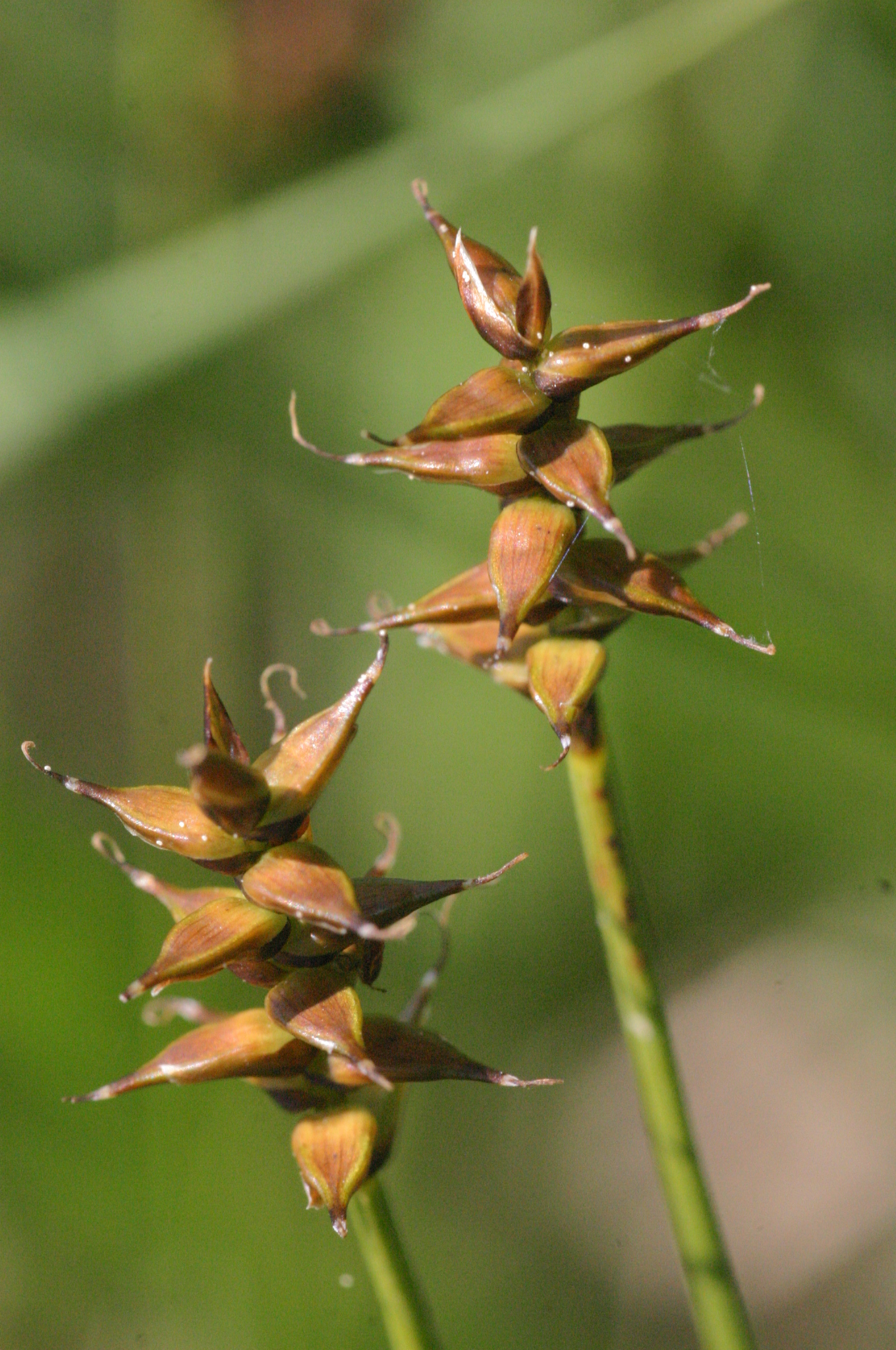
- Fruits of Carex davalliana photographed in Austria in 2008

Conservation status
- Least Concern (IUCN 3.1)

Scientific classification
- Kingdom: Plantae
- Clade: Tracheophytes
- Clade: Angiosperms
- Clade: Monocots
- Clade: Commelinids
- Order: Poales
- Family: Cyperaceae
- Genus: Carex
- Species: C. davalliana

Binomial name
- Carex davalliana Sm.

Synonyms
- List: Carex curvula Willd. ex Kunth; Carex davalliana var. androgyna Döll; Carex davalliana f. sieberiana (Opiz) Bolzon; Carex davalliana subsp. sieberiana (Opiz) K.Richt.; Carex davalliana var. sieberiana (Opiz) Nyman; Carex davalliana var. squarrosa Wallr., not validly publ.; Carex davalliana var. surrecta Wallr.; Carex dioica var. davalliana (Sm.) Wahlenb.; Carex dioicotrigona St.-Lag.; Carex leucorhiza Dulac; Carex recurvirostra Haller f. ex Steud.; Carex reflexa Gaudin; Carex scabra Hoppe; Carex sieberiana Opiz; Carex villosa Franch. & Sav.; Caricinella scabra (Hoppe) St.-Lag.; Maukschia scabra (Hoppe) Heuff.; Psyllophora davalliana (Sm.) Schur; Psyllophora sieberiana (Opiz) Opiz; Vignea davalliana (Sm.) Rchb.

= Carex davalliana =

Species of grass-like plant

Carex davalliana, or Davall's sedge, is a species of sedge found in inland wetlands across continental Europe. It is dioecious, with male and female flowers on separate plants.

== Distribution ==
The species became extinct across the British Isles in 1852 and has not reestablished since. It was only ever identified at one site in the British Isles (a calcareous mire near Bath, Somerset). It became extinct when the land was drained for building houses.
