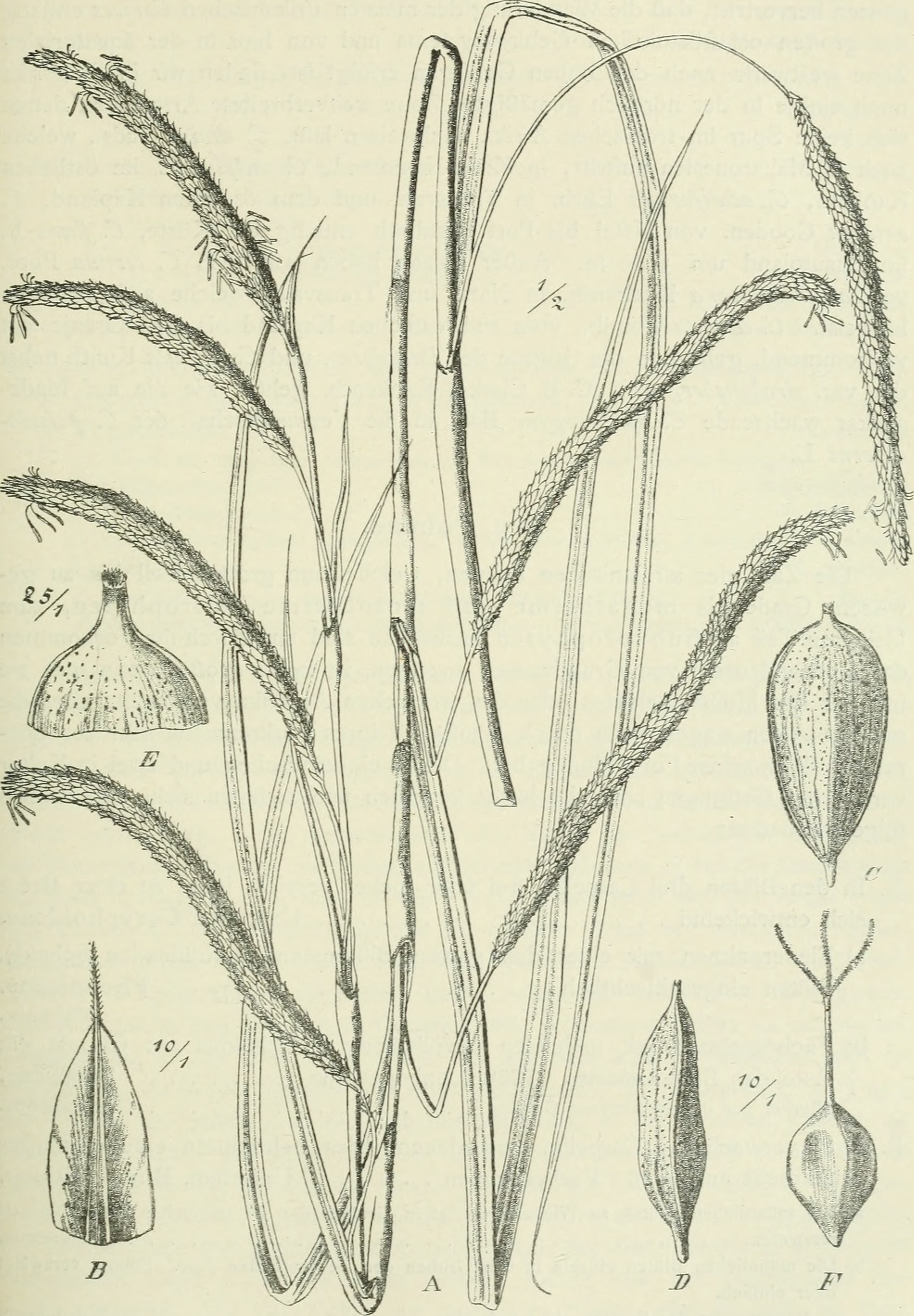

Conservation status
- Least Concern (IUCN 3.1)

Scientific classification
- Kingdom: Plantae
- Clade: Tracheophytes
- Clade: Angiosperms
- Clade: Monocots
- Clade: Commelinids
- Order: Poales
- Family: Cyperaceae
- Genus: Carex
- Species: C. petitiana

Binomial name
- Carex petitiana A. Rich.

Synonyms
- Carex longipedunculata K. Schum.; Carex preussii K. Schum.

= Carex petitiana =

Species of grass-like plant

Carex petitiana is a species of sedge in the family Cyperaceae that grows in swamps and bogs at altitudes of 1,800–3,600 metres (5,900–11,800 ft) in Cameroon, the Democratic Republic of Congo, Ethiopia, Kenya, Malawi, Nigeria, Tanzania, Uganda, and Zimbabwe. Two subspecies are recognised:

- C. petitiana subsp. attenuata – only recorded from Malawi and Zimbabwe
- C. petitiana subsp. petitiana (Kük.) Luceño & M. Escudero – throughout the species' range
