= Carex mildbraediana =

Conservation status
- Least Concern (IUCN 3.1)

Scientific classification
- Kingdom: Plantae
- Clade: Tracheophytes
- Clade: Angiosperms
- Clade: Monocots
- Clade: Commelinids
- Order: Poales
- Family: Cyperaceae
- Genus: Carex
- Species: C. mildbraediana

Binomial name
- Carex mildbraediana Kük., 1909

Species of sedge

Carex lushanensis is a tussock-forming perennial in the family Cyperaceae. It is native to parts of Africa.

== See also ==
- List of Carex species
