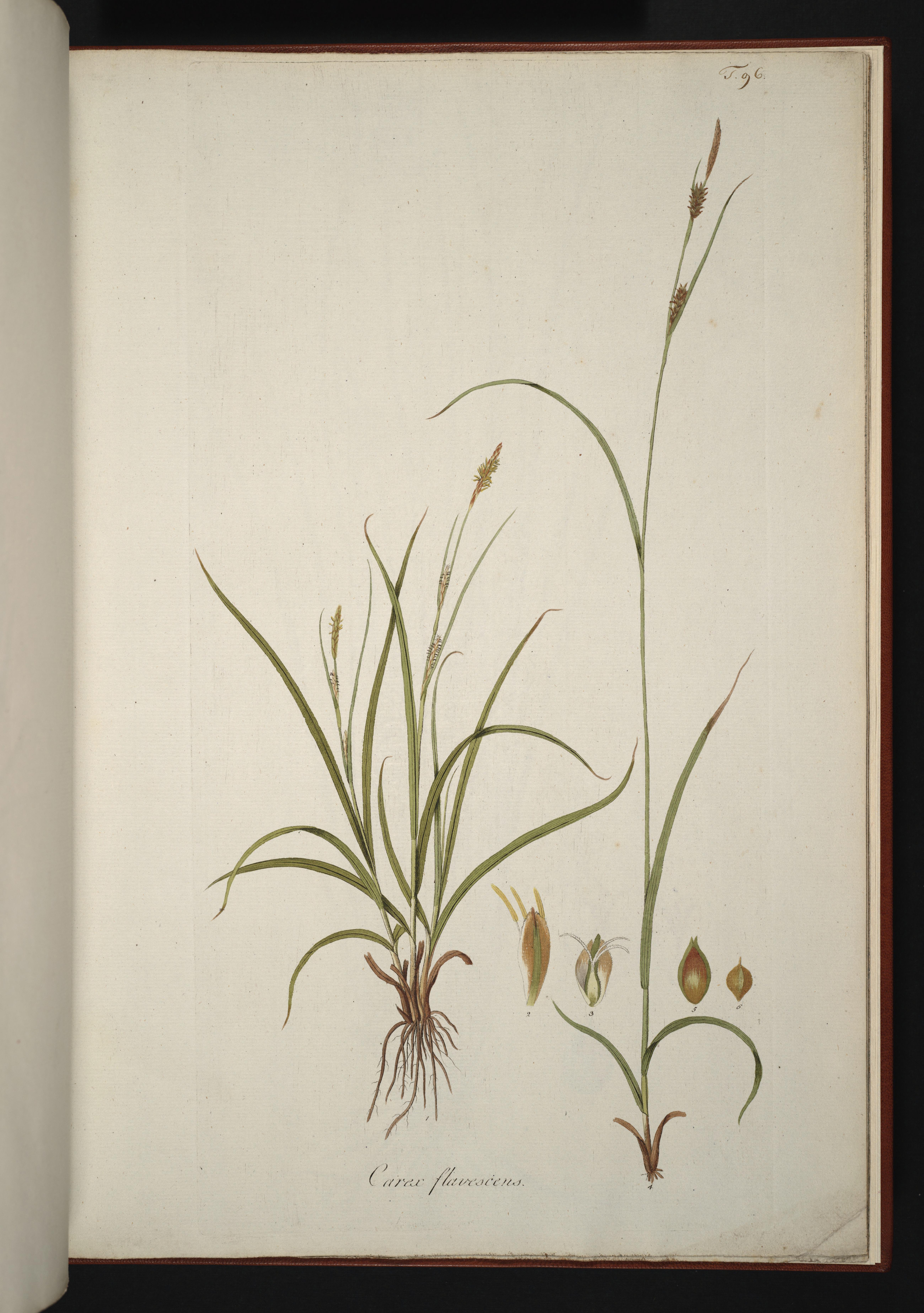

Scientific classification
- Kingdom: Plantae
- Clade: Embryophytes
- Clade: Tracheophytes
- Clade: Spermatophytes
- Clade: Angiosperms
- Clade: Monocots
- Clade: Commelinids
- Order: Poales
- Family: Cyperaceae
- Genus: Carex
- Species: C. burchelliana

Binomial name
- Carex burchelliana Boeckeler

= Carex burchelliana =

Species of plant

Carex burchelliana is a tussock-forming species of perennial sedge in the family Cyperaceae. It is native to the Cape Provinces and Northern Provinces of South Africa.

== See also ==
- List of Carex species
