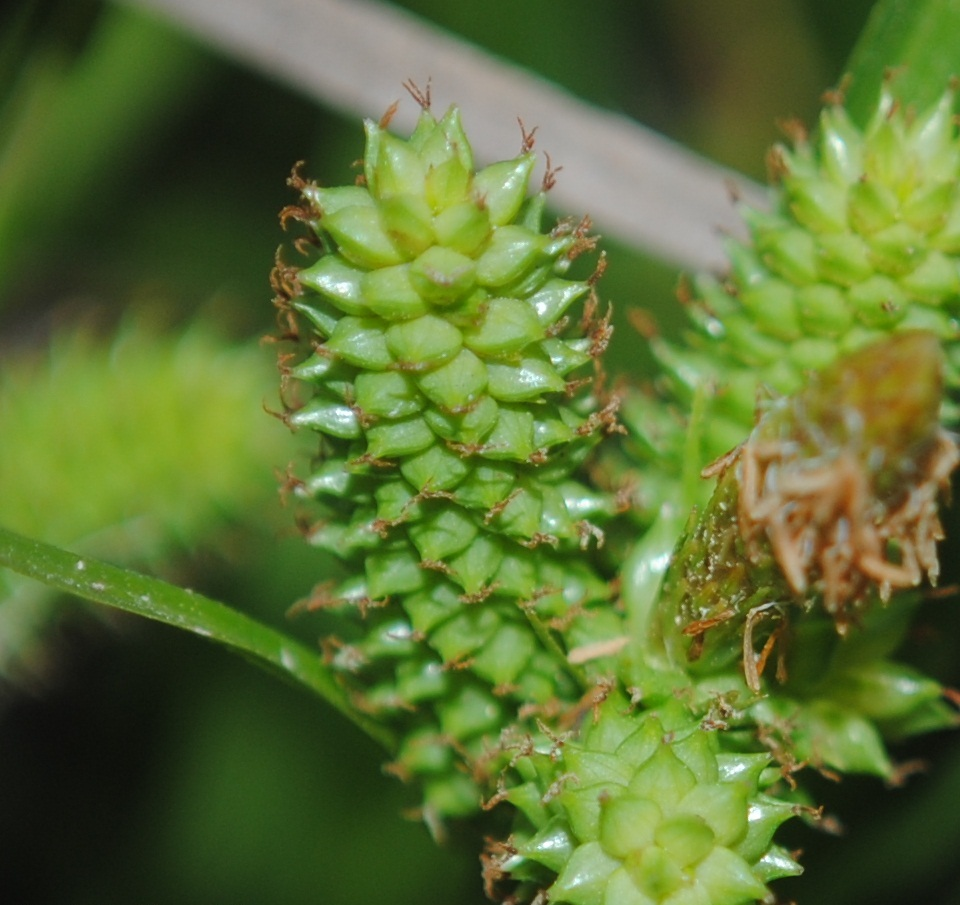

Conservation status
- Least Concern (IUCN 3.1)

Scientific classification
- Kingdom: Plantae
- Clade: Tracheophytes
- Clade: Angiosperms
- Clade: Monocots
- Clade: Commelinids
- Order: Poales
- Family: Cyperaceae
- Genus: Carex
- Species: C. vixdentata

Binomial name
- Carex vixdentata (Kuk.) G.A.Wheeler

Synonyms
- Carex extensa var. vixdentata Kük.

= Carex vixdentata =

Species of plant

Carex vixdentata is a tussock-forming species of perennial sedge in the family Cyperaceae. It is native to parts of South America.

== Description ==
Carex vixdentata is a grass-like, clump-forming plant, with stems reaching 10 to 60 cm. Its basal sheaths are reddish in color and fibrous in texture. The leaves are 3 mm wide, accompanied by a proximal bract measuring 10 to 15 cm. The inflorescence consists of several spikes, including both male and female.

== Distribution and habitat ==
This species is endemic to E. Paraguay, NE. and S. Central Argentina, and Uruguay.It favours muddy, and sometimes sandy soil along the coast, and also occasionally inland.

== See also ==
- List of Carex species
