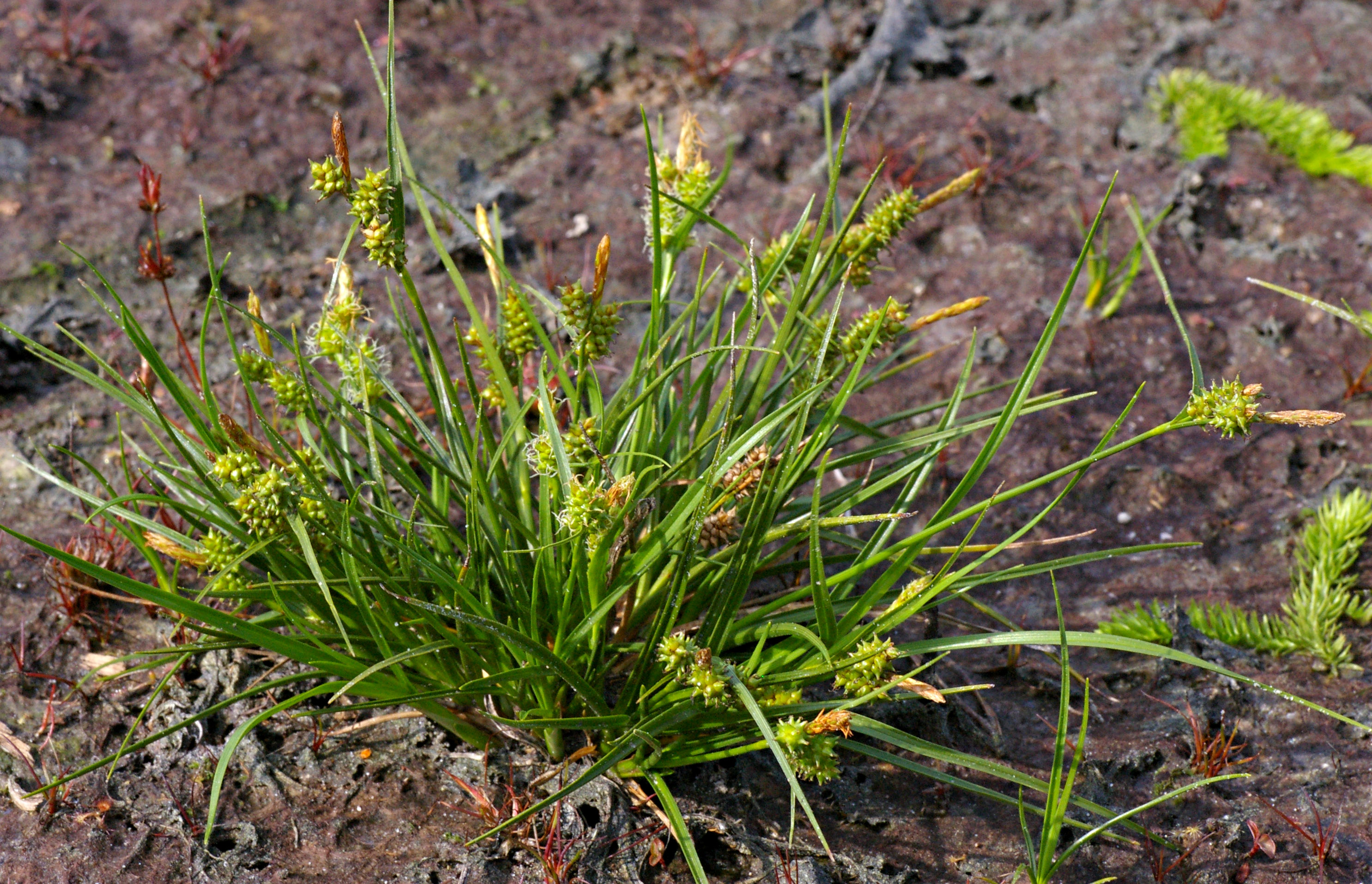
- Carex viridula var. viridula

Conservation status
- Secure (NatureServe)

Scientific classification
- Kingdom: Plantae
- Clade: Tracheophytes
- Clade: Angiosperms
- Clade: Monocots
- Clade: Commelinids
- Order: Poales
- Family: Cyperaceae
- Genus: Carex
- Section: Carex sect. Ceratocystis
- Species: C. viridula

Binomial name
- Carex viridula Michx.

= Carex viridula =

Species of grass-like plant

Carex viridula, known as little green sedge, green sedge, or greenish sedge, is a small flowering plant native to North America, Europe, Asia, and Morocco.

== Taxonomy ==
Carex viridula is in the section Carex sect. Ceratocystis, a circumboreal group with around six other species, although the taxonomy of this group is controversial, and up to 19 species have been recognized.

Flora of North America accepts the following three subspecies and two varieties of Carex viridula:

- Carex viridula subsp. brachyrrhyncha
  - Carex viridula var. elatior
  - Carex viridula var. saxilittoralis
- Carex viridula subsp. oedocarpa
- Carex viridula subsp. viridula

There is also variety Carex viridula var. bergrothii (Palmgr.) B.Schmid (synonym Carex bergrothii Palmgr.).

Kew's Plants of the World Online considers Carex viridula a synonym of Carex oederi, and accepts two varieties:

- Carex oederi var. bergrothii (Palmgr.) Hedrén & Lassen
- Carex oederi var. oederi

== Conservation status ==
It is listed as endangered in Connecticut and Pennsylvania. It is listed as threatened in Illinois.
