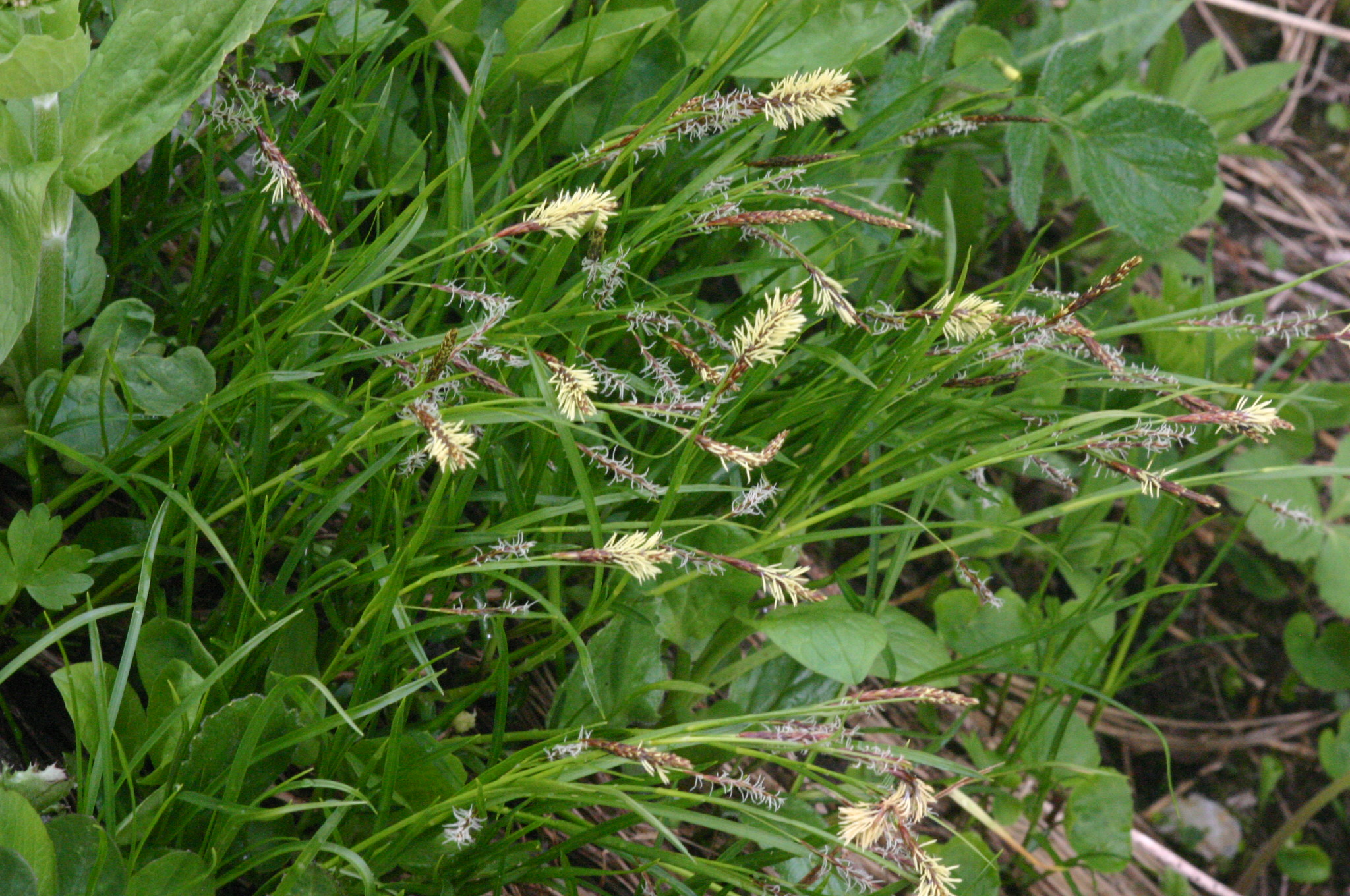
- Habit
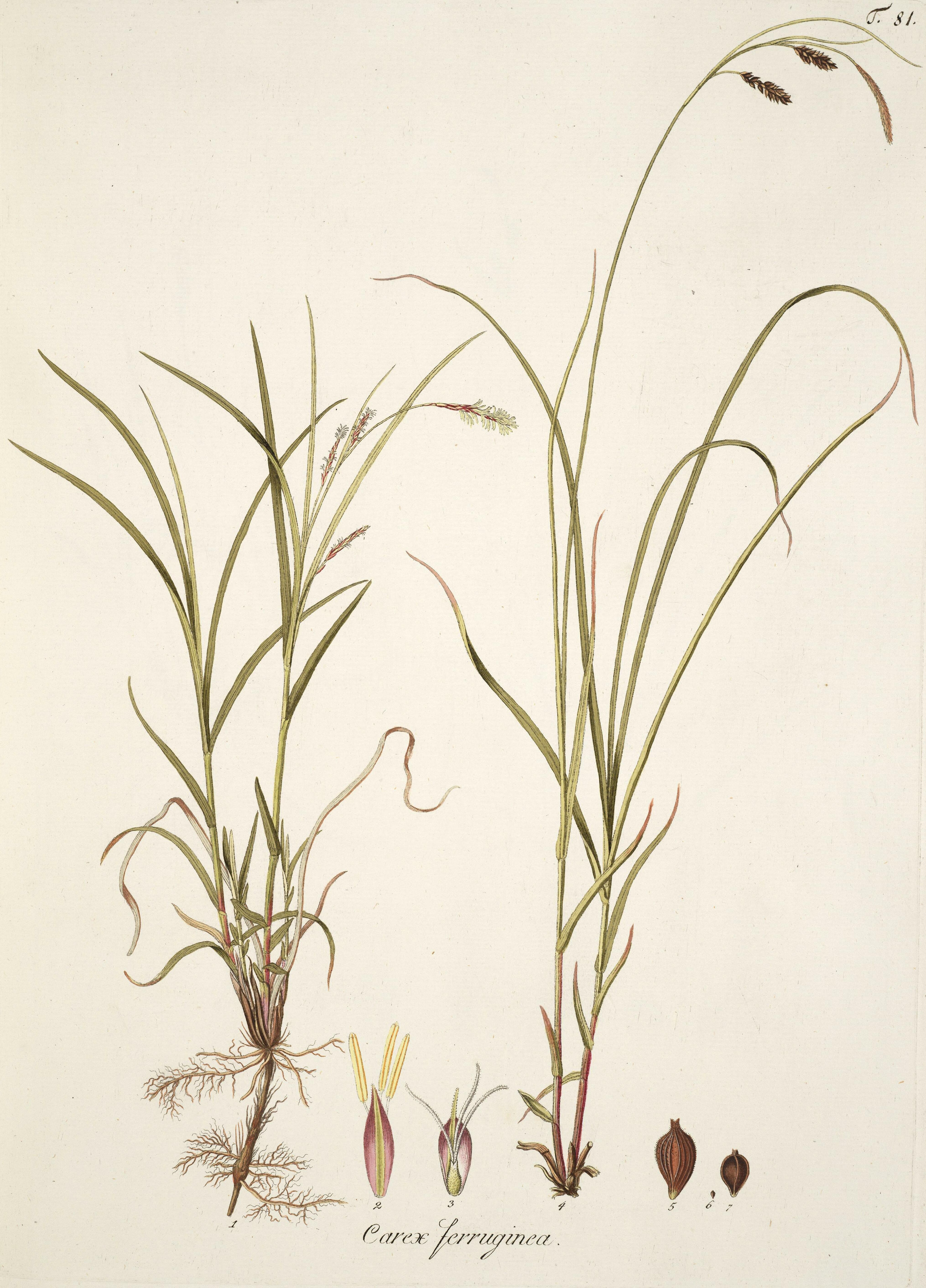
- Botanical illustration

Scientific classification
- Kingdom: Plantae
- Clade: Tracheophytes
- Clade: Angiosperms
- Clade: Monocots
- Clade: Commelinids
- Order: Poales
- Family: Cyperaceae
- Genus: Carex
- Species: C. ferruginea

Binomial name
- Carex ferruginea Scop.

Synonyms
- List: Carex alpigena A.Kern. ex Dalla Torre; Carex brachyrhyncha Gsaller; Carex brevifolia Host; Carex cristata Clairv.; Carex ferruginea subsp. kerneri (Kohts) K.Richt.; Carex frigida Vill.; Carex gracillima Steud. & Hochst.; Carex kerneri Kohts; Carex mielichhoferi Schkuhr; Carex nana Lam.; Carex rigida Schrank; Carex scopoliana Willd.; Carex scopolii Gaudin; Carex spadicea Host; Carex spadicea J.F.Gmel.; Carex tenerrima Murr & Appel; Edritria ferruginea (Scop.) Raf.

= Carex ferruginea =

Species of grass-like plant

Carex ferruginea, the rusty sedge or rust-coloured sedge, is a species of flowering plant in the family Cyperaceae. It is native to the Alps, the southern Carpathians, and the western Balkan Peninsula, and has been introduced to the U.S. state of New Jersey. It is a glacial relict species.

This species is a part of the distinctive grassland communities along the alpine chain. A phytosociological survey of the south-eastern Alps described the new ecological association Hormino pyrenaici–Caricetum ferrugineae, highlighting the independence of this flora from that of the northern Alps.

== Distribution and habitat ==
The species ranges throughout the entire Alpine arc, the Jura, the southern Carpathians and parts of the Balkan Peninsula.

It occupies the subalpine belt at roughly 1700–2300 metres elevation, where it builds dense, sloping meadows in sites with a constant groundwater supply—either from shallow aquifers in depressions or from the slow melt of long-lasting snow beds. On steep, freely draining slopes the prolonged snow-melt is vital for retaining soil moisture.

== Community composition and ecology ==
South-eastern Alpine stands differ floristically from their northern counterparts. Diagnostic companions include the dragon's-mouth Horminum pyrenaicum, Pedicularis elongata, Potentilla crantzii, Scorzonera aristata, Knautia longifolia and Festuca norica.

The meadows are dominated by C. ferruginea with frequent Carex sempervirens, Sesleria varia, Deschampsia cespitosa and F. norica beneath a conspicuous layer of flowering herbs such as Trollius europaeus, Leontodon hispidus and Veratrum album.

The association is recorded from the Val d'Adige (Bolzano) eastwards to at least the Canal del Ferro (Udine), with probable extensions into the Insubrian Alps and the Alpine foothills. Four sub-associations are recognised:

- typicum – the modal form richest in characteristic species;
- valerianetosum montanae – on relatively steep slopes in clearings of spruce woods;
- willemetetosum stipitatae – in gently sloping depressions adjoining neutro-alkaline fens;
- ericetosum carneae – the driest expression, usually at the foot of stabilised scree cones.

== Ecological significance ==
Because these grasslands rely on very specific geomorphological, edaphic and microclimatic settings, they tend to be long-lived landscape features. Their phytogeographical distinctness underlines the autonomy of the south-eastern Alpine flora from both the northern Alpine Caricetum ferrugineae and the Illyrian Hyperico alpini–Caricetum ferrugineae communities.
