= Carex tasmanica =

Scientific classification
- Kingdom: Plantae
- Clade: Tracheophytes
- Clade: Angiosperms
- Clade: Monocots
- Clade: Commelinids
- Order: Poales
- Family: Cyperaceae
- Genus: Carex
- Species: C. tasmanica

Binomial name
- Carex tasmanica Kük.

Synonyms
- Carex richmondii Boott ex C.B.Clarke; Echinochlaenia tasmanica (Kük.) Fedde & J.Schust.

Species of flowering plant

Carex tasmanica, called curly sedge (a name its shares with a few other members of its genus), is a species of flowering plant in the family Cyperaceae, native to Victoria and Tasmania states in Australia. It gets its common name from the distinctive helical spirals its leaves form when they dry out. Considered a threatened species, none of its populations are in a protected area.
