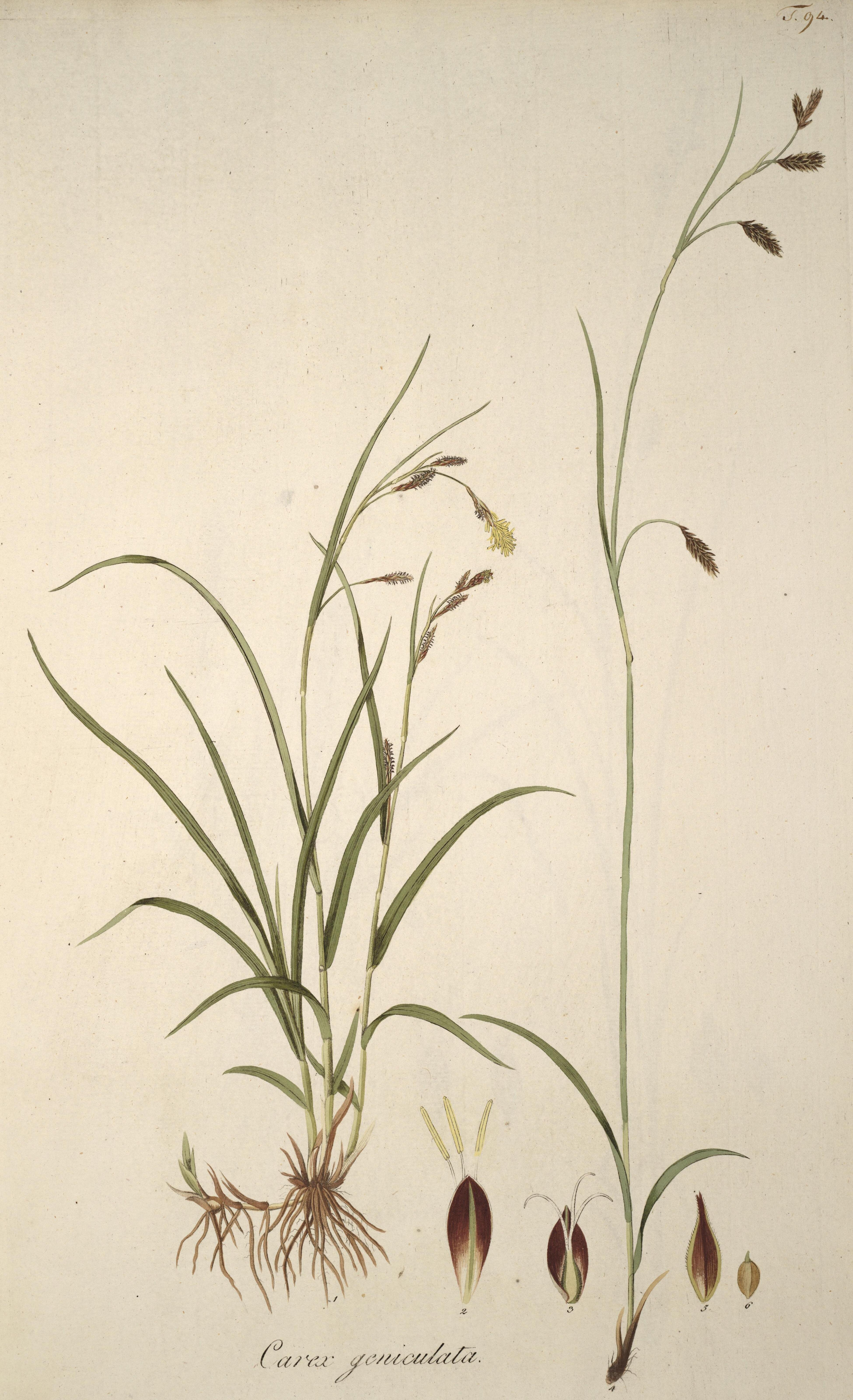
- Botanical illustration

Scientific classification
- Kingdom: Plantae
- Clade: Embryophytes
- Clade: Tracheophytes
- Clade: Spermatophytes
- Clade: Angiosperms
- Clade: Monocots
- Clade: Commelinids
- Order: Poales
- Family: Cyperaceae
- Genus: Carex
- Species: C. frigida

Binomial name
- Carex frigida All.

Synonyms
- List: Carex comari H.Lév. & Vaniot; Carex davalliana var. cyrnea Briq.; Carex davalliana subsp. cyrnea (Briq.) Cif. & Giacom.; Carex frigida var. brevirostris Kük.; Carex frigida f. comari (H.Lév. & Vaniot) Kük.; Carex frigida var. flavescens Christ; Carex frigida f. flavescens Christ; Carex frigida var. geniculata (Host) Nyman; Carex frigida f. pyrenaica Christ; Carex geniculata Host; Carex helvetica Honck.; Carex pseudofrigida C.B.Clarke; Carex spadicea Schkuhr; Carex sphaerica Lapeyr.; Carex variegata Lam.

= Carex frigida =

Species of plant

Carex frigida, the ice sedge, is a species of flowering plant in the family Cyperaceae. It is native to the Pyrenees, the Alps, and some of the other mountainous areas of Europe. A rhizomatous geophyte, it is typically found alongside springs and watercourses.
