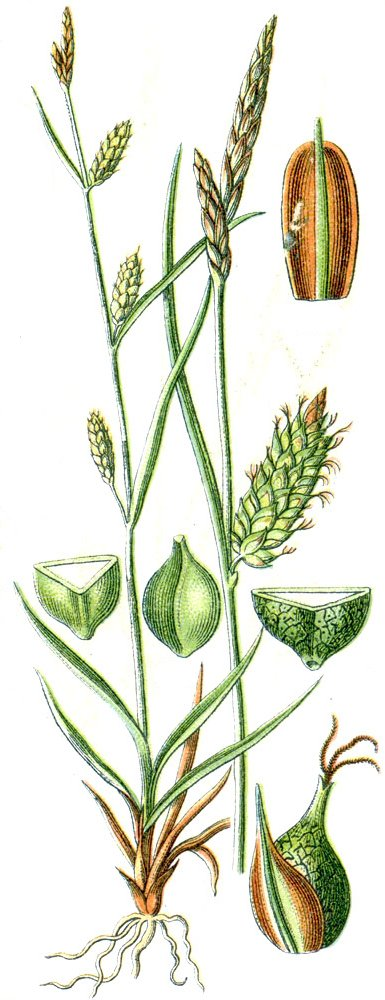
- Botanical illustration
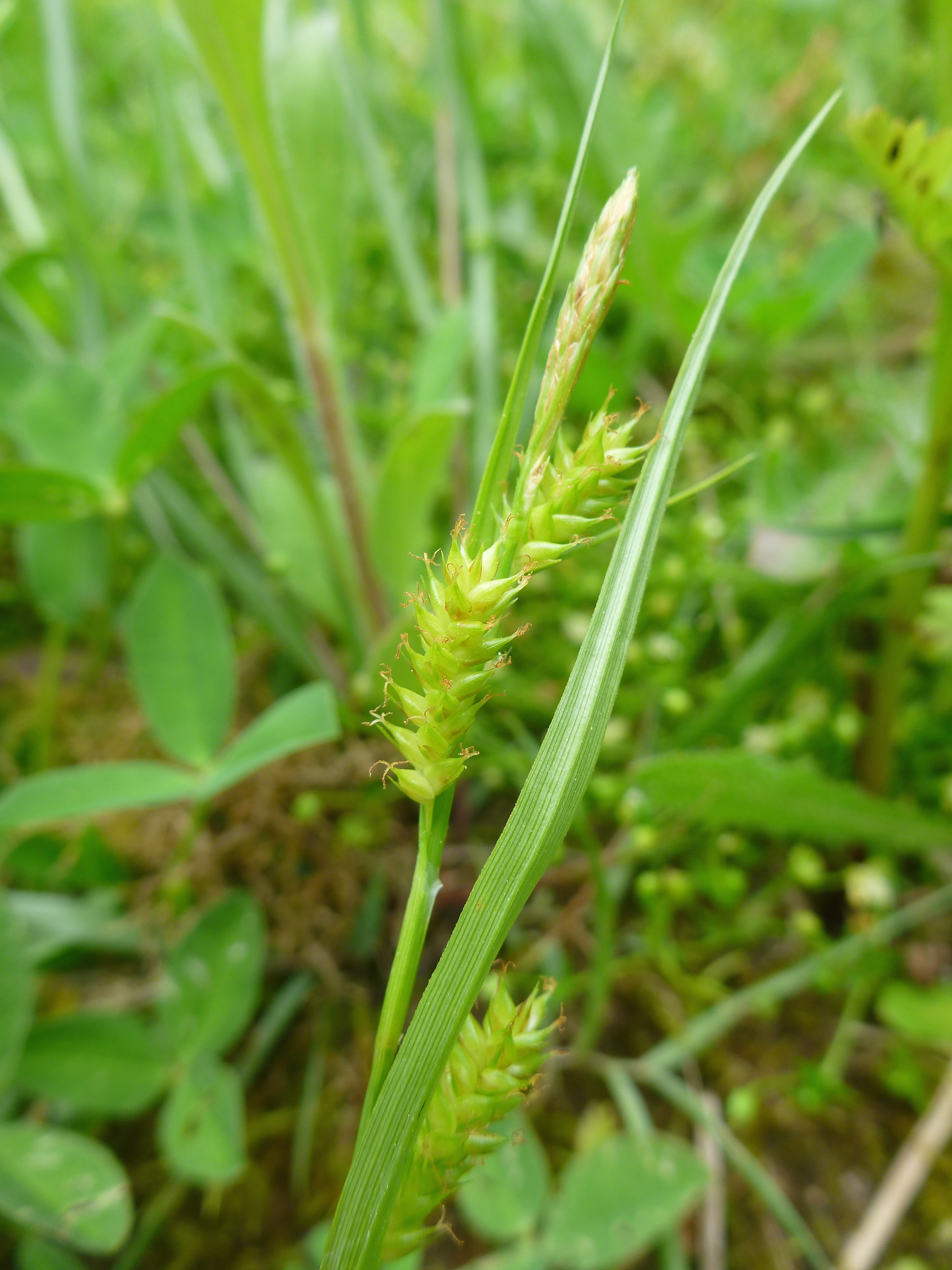
- Inflorescence

Conservation status
- Least Concern (IUCN 3.1)

Scientific classification
- Kingdom: Plantae
- Clade: Tracheophytes
- Clade: Angiosperms
- Clade: Monocots
- Clade: Commelinids
- Order: Poales
- Family: Cyperaceae
- Genus: Carex
- Species: C. punctata

Binomial name
- Carex punctata Gaudin

Synonyms
- List: Carex corsicana Link; Carex helvetica Schleich. ex Kunth; Carex pallidior Degl; Carex sismanii Velen

= Carex punctata =

Species of flowering plant in the sedge family

Carex punctata, the dotted sedge, is a species of flowering plant in the Cyperaceae family. It is native to Macaronesia, northwest Africa, southern, central, and northern Europe, and Turkey. Its chromosome number is 2n=68.

== Description ==
Carex punctata is a perennial, tussock-forming plant very similar to Carex distans, except for the length of the lowest bract, which in Carex punctata exceeds the inflorescence, whereas in the case of Carex distans the bract is shorter than the spikelet. It grows to a height of 40–80 centimetres (16–31 in) tall. Leaf sheaths are brown; blades are green, flat and 3–4.5 millimetres (0.12–0.18 in) wide. The inflorescence consists of one or multiple flower spikes, appearing between March and May.

== Distribution and habitat ==
Carex punctata favours sheltered rock ledges and crevices on sea-cliffs. It also grows in salt marshes, and rocky or sandy areas where rivers and streams reach the ocean.

== Subtaxa ==
The following varieties are currently accepted:

- Carex punctata var. laevicaulis (Hochst. ex Seub.) Boott
- Carex punctata var. punctata
