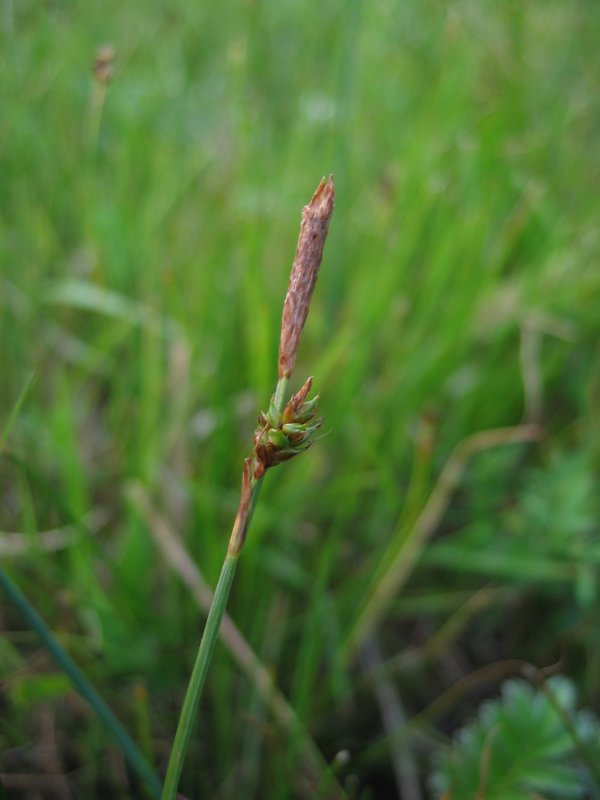

Conservation status
- Least Concern (IUCN 3.1)

Scientific classification
- Kingdom: Plantae
- Clade: Tracheophytes
- Clade: Angiosperms
- Clade: Monocots
- Clade: Commelinids
- Order: Poales
- Family: Cyperaceae
- Genus: Carex
- Section: Carex sect. Spirostachyae
- Species: C. distans

Binomial name
- Carex distans L.

= Carex distans =

Species of plant

Carex distans, commonly known as distant sedge, is a plant species in the sedge family, Cyperaceae. It is native to Europe and North Africa. It is part of a complex of similar species that occur across Eurasia. Its relatives include Carex diluta of central Asia, which has also been introduced to North America in Montana. Carex distans has been introduced to US states including Maryland and Pennsylvania. More recently, it was found in Oregon. There is a report from Victoria, Australia as well.

== Description ==
C. distans is densely cespitose and 40–80 centimetres (16–31 in) tall. Leaves: sheaths are brown to orange-brown; blades are green, flat and 3–4.5 millimetres (0.12–0.18 in) wide. The inflorescence consists of widely separated spikes. The terminal spike is staminate and the lower 2–4 spikes are pistillate. The perigynia (also called utricles) are green to brownish, 3.5–4.6 millimetres (0.14–0.18 in) long, contracted to a beak 1–1.4 millimetres (0.039–0.055 in) long. Stigmas are 3 and achenes trigonous. 2n = 68, 70–72, 74.

== Distribution and habitat ==
In Europe, this sedge grows in wetlands and fens, often on sandy or rocky soils. It can grow in brackish marshes and is especially common along coastlines. In the United States, it is found on ballast dumps and in other disturbed, sandy locations. The species is widespread and its overall population appears stable.
