= Ernest Nelmes =

British botanist (1895–1959)

Ernest Nelmes (born 1895 - died 1959) was a British botanist.
