= Oat sensitivity =

Type of allergy caused by oats

Oat sensitivity represents a sensitivity to the proteins found in oats, Avena sativa. Sensitivity to oats can manifest as a result of allergy to oat seed storage proteins either inhaled or ingested. A more complex condition affects individuals who have gluten-sensitive enteropathy in which there is an autoimmune response to avenin, the glutinous protein in oats similar to the gluten within wheat. Sensitivity to oat foods can also result from their frequent contamination by wheat, barley, or rye particles.

== Oat allergy ==
Studies on farmers with grain dust allergy and children with atopy dermatitis reveal that oat proteins can act as both respiratory and skin allergens. Oat dust sensitivity in farms found 53% showed reactivity to dust, second only to barley (70%), and almost double that of wheat dust. The 66 kDa protein in oats was visualized by 28 out of 33 sera (84%). However, there was evident non-specific binding to this region and thus it may also represent lectin-like binding. IgA and IgG responses, meanwhile, like those seen to anti-gliadin antibodies in celiac disease or dermatitis herpetiformis, are not seen in response to avenins in atopic dermatitis patients.

Food allergies to oats can accompany atopy dermatitis. Oat avenins share similarities with γ and ω-gliadins of wheat — based on these similarities they could potentiate both enteropathic response and anaphylactic responses. Oat allergy in gluten-sensitive enteropathy can explain an avenin-sensitive individual with no histological abnormality, no T-cell reaction to avenin, bearing the rarer DQ2.5trans phenotype, and with anaphylactic reaction to avenin.

== Avenin-sensitive enteropathy ==
Oat toxicity in people with gluten-related disorders depends on the oat cultivar consumed because the immunoreactivities of toxic prolamins are different among oat varieties. Furthermore, oats are frequently cross-contaminated with the other gluten-containing cereals. Pure oat (labelled as "pure oat" or "gluten-free oat") refers to oats uncontaminated with any of the other gluten-containing cereals.

Some cultivars of pure oat could be a safe part of a gluten-free diet, requiring knowledge of the oat variety used in food products for a gluten-free diet. Nevertheless, the long-term effects of pure oats consumption are still unclear and further studies identifying the cultivars used are needed before making final recommendations on their inclusion in the gluten-free diet.

=== Immunological evidence ===
==== Anti-avenin antibodies ====
In 1992, six proteins were extracted from oats that reacted with a single coeliac sera. Three of the proteins were prolamins, and have been called CIP 1 (gamma avenin), CIP 2, and CIP3. They had the following amino acid sequences:

Antibody recognition sites on three avenins
CIP1 (γ-avenin)               P S E Q Y Q P Y P E Q Q Q P F 
CIP2 (γ-avenin) T T T V Q Y D P S E Q Y Q P Y P E Q Q Q P F V Q Q Q P P F 
CIP3 (α-avenin) T T T V Q Y N P S E Q Y Q P Y  

Within the same study, three other proteins were identified, one of them an α-amylase inhibitor as identified by protein homology. A follow-up study showed that most celiacs have anti-avenin antibodies (AVAs), with a specificity and sensitivity comparable to anti-gliadin antibodies. A subsequent study found that these AVAs did not result from cross-reaction with wheat. However, recently it has been found that AVAs drop as soon as Triticeae glutens are removed from the diet. Anti-avenin antibodies declined in treated celiacs on an oat diet in 136 individuals, suggesting oats can be involved in celiac disease when wheat is present, but are not involved when wheat is removed from the diet. The study, however, did find an increased number of patients with higher intraepithelial lymphocytes (IELs, a type of white bloodcell) in the oat-eating cohort. Regardless of whether or not this observation is a direct allergic immune response, by itself this is essentially benign.

==== Cellular immunity ====
In gluten-sensitive enteropathy, prolamins mediate between T-cells and antigen-presenting cells, whereas anti-transglutaminase antibodies confer autoimmunity via covalent attachment to gliadin. In 16 examined coeliacs, none produced a significant Th1 response. Th1 responses are needed to stimulate T-helper cells that mediate disease. This could indicate that coeliac disease does not directly involve avenin or that the sample size was too small to detect the occasional responder.

Evidence that there are exceptional cases came in a 2004 study on oats. The patients drafted for this study were those who had symptoms of celiac disease when on a "pure-oat" challenge, therefore not representative of a celiac sample. This study found that four patients had symptoms after oat ingestion, and three had elevated Marsh scores for histology and avenin responsive T-cells, indicating avenin-sensitive enteropathy (ASE). All three patients were the DQ2.5/DQ2 (HLA DR3-DQ2/DR7-DQ2) phenotype. Patients with DQ2.5/DQ2.2 tend to be the most prone toward gluten sensitive enteropathy (GSE), have the highest risk for GS-EATL, and shows signs of more severe disease at diagnosis. While the DQ2.5/DQ2 phenotype represents only 25% of celiac patients, it accounts for all of the ASE celiacs, and 60-70% of patients with GS-EATL. Synthetic avenin peptides were synthesized either in native or deamidated form, and the deamidated peptides showed higher response.

DQ2.5/T-cell receptor recognition from 2 Oat-sensitive coeliacs
TCR-Site1                             Y Q P Y P E Q E~E~P F V
TCR-Site2                           Q Y Q P Y P E Q Q Q P F V Q Q Q Q
Antibody recognition site(see above)
CIP2 (γ-avenin) T T T V Q Y D P S E Q Y Q P Y P E Q Q Q P F V Q Q Q P P F

The overlap of the antibody and T-cell sites, given trypsin digestion of avenin, suggest this region is dominant in immunity. The TCR-site1 was synthetically made as deamidated ("~E~"), and native peptide requires transglutaminase to reach full activation. Two studies to date have looked at the ability of different oat strains to promote various immunochemical aspects of celiac disease. While preliminary, these studies indicate different strains may have different risks for avenin sensitivity.

== See also ==
- Gluten-related disorders
- List of allergies
