= Gluten-sensitive enteropathy–associated conditions =

Medical conditions

Gluten-sensitive enteropathy–associated conditions are comorbidities or complications of gluten-related gastrointestinal distress (that is, gluten-sensitive enteropathy or GSE). GSE has key symptoms typically restricted to the bowel and associated tissues; however, there are a wide variety of associated conditions. These include bowel disorders (diarrhoea, constipation, irritable bowel), eosinophilic gastroenteritis and increase with coeliac disease (CD) severity. With some early onset and a large percentage of late onset disease, other disorders appear prior to the coeliac diagnosis or allergic-like responses (IgE or IgA, IgG) markedly increased in GSE. Many of these disorders persist on a strict gluten-free diet (GF diet or GFD), and are thus independent of coeliac disease after triggering. For example, autoimmune thyroiditis is a common finding with GSE.

However, GSEs' association with disease is not limited to common autoimmune diseases. Coeliac disease has been found at increased frequency on followup to many autoimmune diseases, some rare. Complex causes of autoimmune diseases often demonstrates only weak association with coeliac disease. The frequency of GSE is typically around 0.3 to 1% and lifelong risk of this form of gluten sensitivity increases in age, possibly as high as 2% for people over 60 years of age. This coincides with the period in life when late-onset autoimmune diseases also rise in frequency.

Genetic studies indicate that coeliac disease genetically links to loci shared by linkage with other autoimmune diseases. These linkages may be coincidental with how symptomatic disease is selected from a largely asymptomatic population.

== Associated blood disorders ==
=== Deficiencies ===
Avitaminosis. Avitaminosis caused by malabsorption in GSE can result in decline of fat soluble vitamins and vitamin B, as well as malabsorption of essential fatty acids. This can cause a wide variety of secondary problems. Hypocalcinemia is also associated with GSE. In treated GSE, the restrictions on diet as well as reduced absorption as a result of prolonged damage may result in post-treatment deficiencies.

- Vitamin A – Poor absorption of vitamin A has been seen in coeliac disease. and it has been suggested that GSE-associated cancers of the esophagus may be related to vitamin A deficiency
- Folate – Folate deficiency is believed to be primary to the following secondary conditions:
  - Megaloblastic anemia
  - Calcification of brain channels – epilepsy, dementia, visual manifestations.
- B_{6} deficiency. Vitamin B_{6} deficiency can result in neuropathies and increases in pain sensitivity. may explain some of the peripheral neuropathies, pain and depression associated with GSE.
- B_{12} deficiency
  - Megaloblastic anemia
  - Pernicious anemia
- Vitamin D – Vitamin D deficiency can result in osteopenia and osteoporosis
  - Hypocalcemia
- Vitamin K – Coeliac disease has been identified in patients with a pattern of bleeding that treatment of vitamin K increased levels of prothrombin.
- Vitamin E – deficiency of vitamin E can lead to CNS problems and possibly associated with myopathy

Mineral deficiencies. GSE is associated with the following mineral deficiencies:

- Calcium – Hypocalcemia causing Oesteopenia
- Magnesium – Hypomagnesemia, may lead to parathyroid abnormalities.
- Iron – Iron deficiency anemia
- Phosphorus – Hypophosphatemia, causing Oesteopenia
- Zinc – Zinc deficiencies are believed to be associated with increased risk of Esophagus Carcinoma
- Copper – Deficiency
- Selenium – Deficiency – Selenium and zinc deficiencies may play a role increasing risk of cancer. Selenium deficiency may also be an aggravating factor for autoimmune hyperthyroidism (Graves disease).

Blood factors

- Carnitine – Deficiency.
- Prolactin – Deficiency (childhood).
- Homocysteine – Excess.

=== Anemia ===
Megaloblastic anemia (MA) is associated with GSE and is believed to be the result of B_{12} and folate deficiency. In GSE, it appears to be associated with the IgA-less phenotype. Unlike other forms of megaloblastic anemia, GSEA MA is not a form of autoimmune gastritis.

Pernicious anemia (PA). Pernicious anemia is associated with GSE and is believed to result primarily from malabsorption phenomena.

Iron-deficiency anemia. Iron-deficiency anemia (IDA) may be the only symptom for CD, detected in subclinical CD and is accompanied by a decrease in serum ferritin levels. This can cause additional problems (see: symptoms of IDA and certain conditions like such as Paterson-Brown Kelly (Plummer–Vinson syndrome). Whereas IDA is corrected on GF diet, refractory disease or gluten-sensitive malignancies can cause persistent IDA.

=== Clotting abnormalities ===
Thromboembolism is a well-described complication of IBD, with a clinical incidence of up to 6% and a three-fold higher risk of disease, and the Factor V Leiden mutation further increases the risk of venous thrombosis. Recent studies describe the co-occurrence between coeliac disease, in which IBD is common in venous thrombosis.

== Dermatitis ==
A study of patients with dermatitis herpetiformis or coeliac disease revealed significantly more gluten in the blood than controls. This increases the risk of asthma, anaphylaxis and dermatological conditions.

=== Dermatitis herpetiformis ===
Triticeae glutens are the primary cause of dermatitis herpetiformis (DH). Epidermal transglutaminase (eTG) is related to tTG and is the autoantigen of DH. It appears that all DH patients have or are susceptible to CD after wheat ingestion. Within the pathology of CD, DH is relatively rare or underdiagnosed, with about 5% of patients presenting with DH. Aphthous stomatitis is a common mouth lesion found in those with coeliac disease.

=== Atopy, urticaria, eczema ===
Chronic urticaria has been seen in a few cases of CD. and are likely the result of fortuitous allergies to wheat, or allergies secondary to GSE. Atopy disorders have been found to be more common in coeliacs and in first degree relatives. Coeliac disease is associated with a number of epidermal conditions including psoriasis

=== Rare dermatitis ===
Prurigo nodularis. Prurigo nodularis has been identified with coeliac disease.

Rothmund–Thomson syndrome. Rothmund–Thomson syndrome, or poikiloderma congenitale, is a rare disorder, generally attributed to mutations of the RECQL4 helicase gene on 8q24 with features that include photosensitivity and poikilodermatous skin changes, etc., and has been reported in one coeliac patient.

=== Alopecia areata ===
GSE has been found to be associated with alopecia areata (patchy baldness), however hair regrowth did not necessarily occur after taking up a gluten free diet.

== Endocrine disorders ==
=== Autoimmune thyroidosis ===
[Section under construction] Grave's Disease, Hashimoto's thyroiditis. Grave's disease and Hashimoto's thyroiditis are greatly increased in patients with CD. Grave's disease is an autoimmune hyperthyroidism, as GSE is a potentiator for autoimmune disease, but GD is more commonly found and avitaminosis of selenium and other minerals may be a factor in this increase.

=== Diabetes ===
Type 1 (Juvenile onset). The incidence of juvenile Type 1 Diabetes (T1D) is about 1:500 in the U.S. population, and is the result of autoimmune damage to the Islets of Langerhans cells in the pancreas. The level of adult onset T1D plus ambiguous T1D/T2D is unknown. It is unclear how large a role Triticeae has in T1D, which also shows strong linkage to DQ2.5 and DQ8. Childhood (male) Type 1 diabetes increases the risk for GSE and vice versa and it now appears that GSE precedes T1D in many cases and an active search for coeliac disease in early juvenile diabetes patients revealed that GF diet resulted in some improvements. A high frequency of diabetes patients have anti-transglutaminase antibodies along with increased levels of gluten specific T-cells in T1D patients. From an evolutionary point of view it is difficult to explain the high association of T1D and DQ2.5 given negatively selective nature of the disease in NW European population given the number of studies suggesting that the "Super B8" haplotypes has been under positive selection, and appears to be the most characteristic HLA type in NW Europeans indicating an advanced natural history of the haplotype. A T. aesitivum storage globulin, Glb-1 (locus), was identified that is similar to the hypersensitizing peanut protein Ara h 1 and other known plant hypersensitizing proteins. Antibodies to this protein correlated with levels of lymphocyte infiltration into Islet regions of the pancreas. Gastrointestinal viruses may play a role.

=== Addison's disease ===
Studies from Sweden suggest that persons with coeliac disease are 11 times more likely to have Addison's disease (primary adrenal insufficiency) relative to the normal population.

=== Infertility ===
GSE can result in high risk pregnancies and infertility. Some infertile women have GSE and iron deficiency anemia others have zinc deficiency and birth defects may be attributed to folic acid deficiencies. It has also been found to be a rare cause of amenorrhea.

== Gastrointestinal diseases ==
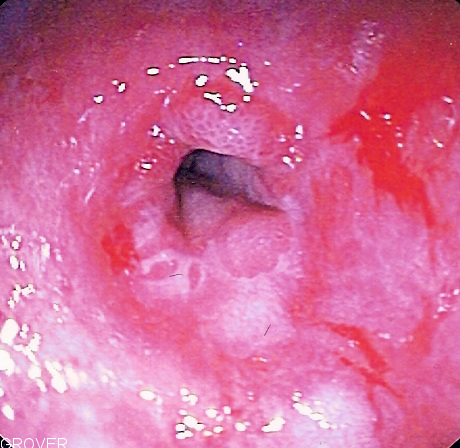
Endoscopic image of peptic stricture, or narrowing of the esophagus near the junction with the stomach due to chronic gastroesophageal reflux. This is the most common cause of dysphagia, or difficulty swallowing, in scleroderma.

While GI disease is one of the major symptoms of GSE that are characterized by increased levels of IgA/IgG to food proteins, many conditions like chronic constipation and irritable bowel disease persist after GF diet. Some of this may be due to persistent undetected food allergies, increased sensitivity of the damaged gut, or problems masked by GSE itself.

=== Irritable bowel (IBS) ===
In diarrhea dominant IB - a common symptom of GSE - increased coeliac disease-associated serum IgG was found in treated and untreated CD patients. IgG was most common in untreated patients with more active DQ2 expression, which dropped on GF diet. Some cases of irritable bowel can be the result of other food intolerances, such as casein intolerance, lactose intolerance, or intolerances to non-dextrose sugars in other foods. It can also be result of overgrowth of yeast or bacteria as a result of excesses of unabsorbed nutrients. IB may not resolve on GF diet, even becoming more severe in rare cases, as it may not have initially been directly linked to gluten consumption.

=== Inflammatory bowel disease (IBD) ===
A recent study of inflammatory bowel disease and coeliac disease found that anti-tTG was increased in inflammatory bowel disease, although most cases were not clinical CD. IBD was increased 10 fold in coeliac disease. Inflammatory bowel disease consists of Crohn's disease, ulcerative colitis and microscopic colitis.

=== Gastroesophageal reflux disease ===
Gastroesophageal reflux disease (GERD) is the indirect result of many factors and some autoimmune diseases like scleroderma. GSE can cause inflammation and delayed gastric emptying, which can persist through most of the sleeping hours causing GERD. GSE is associated with an increase of food allergies - in some patients this can cause diarrhea, but in others, constipation. In some patients, food allergies and GERD are an apparent symptom of GSE, but these allergies and GERD often persist on a GF diet. While GERD associated with GSE can be treated with acid blockers, it is most effectively treated with proper eating habits and elimination diet. The more powerful acid blockers (omeprazole, esomeprazole) can interfere with calcium adsorption and can aggravate preexisting hypocalcaemia and hypomagnesemia, which are more common GSE

=== Eosinophilic oesophagitis ===
One study of 17 children in Italy who were diagnosed with eosinophilic oesophagitis found 6 of them also had coeliac disease. However a systematic review of several similar studies suggested a publication bias and that any association was uncertain.

=== Diseases of the pancreas, gall bladder, bile duct ===
Primary biliary cholangitis. CD is prevalent in primary biliary cholangitis (previously known as primary biliary cirrhosis, PBC). In PBC anti-mitochondrial antibodies are directed toward three mitochondrial autoantigens (pyruvate dehydrogenase, oxoglutarate dehydrogenase, branched-chain alpha-keto acid dehydrogenase), two or more nuclear proteins (nucleoporin 210kDa, nucleoporin 62kDa, centromere protein, and sp100), and 57% of acute liver failure patients have anti-transglutaminase antibodies.

Cholangitis. CD also found at higher than expected frequencies in autoimmune cholangitis and primary sclerosing cholangitis. CD is frequently linked to pancreatitis but also to papillary stenosis and, in India, tropical calcific pancreatitis appears also to be associated with CD.

== Neurological disorders ==
Neuropathies tend to be associated with late-onset coeliac disease. Dementia and ataxia appear to be more common. A recent study of children with neuropathies revealed no increase of CD in early-onset neuropathies. Although many studies link CD to various neuropathies such as migraine, encephalopathy, chorea, brain stem dysfunction, myelopathy, mononeuritis multiplex, Guillain–Barré-like syndrome, and antiganglioside-positive neuropathy with antibodies, strong associations remain largely unconfirmed in epidemiologic studies. A recent study looking for changes in the physiology of the brain found regional cerebral hypoperfusion in 73% of untreated CD. The calcification of channels at the surface of the brain appears to be a leading phenomenon associated with migraine, visual, auditory, schizophrenia, epilepsy, dementia. The problem is that while these are found increased in GSE, the cause of these calcifications is unclear and this may extend beyond GSE to other immunological or allergic phenomena. A 2007 study in Sweden of 14,000 GSE patients revealed no association of CD with multiple sclerosis, Parkinson's disease, Alzheimer's disease, hereditary ataxia, ataxia (the symptom), Huntington's disease, myasthenia gravis, or spinal muscular atrophy, but prior polyneuropathy was associated with subsequent CD. However, a 2009 study of myasthenics revealed that 1 in 23 had high levels of anti-transglutaminase.

=== Peripheral neuropathies ===
Peripheral neuropathies are greatly increased in people who have GSE. In clinical CD there is an obvious reason; avitaminosis and the inability to adsorb essential fatty acids and vitamins can lead to nervous system problems, including sensitivity of the peripheral nervous system. In addition to these problems there are a number or rare autoimmune conditions, secondary autoimmunities, such as fibromyalgia that are more frequent in GSE than in the normal population. Gulliane-Barre syndrome is associated with peripheral neuropathies, and it has been found that anti-ganglioside autoantibodies take part in the binding to axons and schwann cells. Antibodies to these gangliosides have been found elevated in coeliac disease

=== Ataxia ===
A sizable fraction of individuals who have gluten ataxia have signs of GSE (either CD or elevated intraepitheal lymphocytes) and ataxia is a common symptom in GSE. Studies of clinically undefinable ataxia generally had higher proportion of late onset gait ataxia, mild upper limb symptoms, and evidence of peripheral neuropathy, questions were raised about the specificity of testing and false positives. Patients with ataxia and CD have antibodies that react with Purkinje fibers but is restricted to the anti-gliadin IgA/IgG. A recent Swedish study of 14,000 registered coeliacs showed no association of GSE with Ataxia.

=== Dementia and epilepsy ===
Epilepsy has been noticed in a sampling of coeliac disease patients. One prime example is calcium channel obstruction in the brain and dementia. There is a growing body of evidence suggesting that subclinical cases in older adults will typically progress toward dementia, a large number of studies in Italy and Spain have documented earlier onset cases, though the autoimmune condition is not known, folic acid malabsorption may be the cause.

=== Visual and auditory disturbances ===
According to recent studies, calcifications of channels seen in dementia can also occur in specific brain areas such as the visual complex in the occipital lobe. Such calcium channel blockages can cause visual problems or partial field hallucinations (Paroxysmal visual manifestations). Other papers show a link between migraine, visual aura and cerebral calcifications. Disturbances may be followed by convulsions and associated with gastrointestinal phenomena.

=== White matter lesions ===
Ten (of 75) young patients had neurologic findings such as febrile seizures, single generalized seizures, mild ataxia, and muscular hypotonia with retarded motor development, but magnetic resonance imaging detected unilateral and bilateral T2-hyperintensive white-matter lesions in 15 patients (20%)

=== Depression ===
Depression in GSE has several causes; in the more severe CD, depression can be the result of lower vitamin adsorption and essential fatty acid adsorption. Depression and anger may also be the result of lower quality of life issues as a result of gluten-free diet. Depression appears to persist on gluten free diet in a sizable fraction of GSE. Elevated anger has been noted also with GSE.

=== Anxiety ===
Anxiety is a common feature of GSE; treatment on a gluten-free diet is effective at reducing anxiety, some aspect of which may be due to malabsorption phenomena and cytokine activity (i.e. constant stress).

=== Fibromyalgia ===
Fibromyalgia was found in 9% of adult patients relative to 0.03% in the general population with a link common to IBD. Concurrent IBS is found in 30% to 70%. Small intestinal bacterial overgrowth is associated is common with a transient response to antimicrobial therapy.

=== Chronic fatigue ===
Chronic fatigue associated with GSE is a systemic disorder, however there are neurological components that are especially manifest in blood deficiencies like avitaminosis, amineralosis and anemia. Reduced iron and the lack of vitamins folate, B_{6}, B_{12} and malabsorption of essential fatty acids can cause depression and chronic fatigue. Anti-gliadin antibodies correlate with higher risk for chronic-fatique when no clinical finding of CD is present. While fatigue is reduced on gluten-free diet, bouts of depression can become worse.

== Connective tissue disorders ==
=== Arthritis ===
Some instance of arthritis with small bowel villous atrophy have been found to resolve on gluten free diet, and anti-connective tissue antibodies have been found in increased levels in coeliac disease. Anti-rheumatoid factor antibodies are also increased. In addition, cross-reactive anti-beef-collagen antibodies (IgG) may explain some rheumatoid arthritis (RA) incidences. Although the presence of anti-beef collagen antibodies does not necessarily lead to RA, the RA association with Triticeae consumption is secondary to GSE and involves DRB1*0401/4 linkages to DQ8 and is debatable. In one instance rheumatoid arthritis was tied directly to refractory disease.

=== Still's disease ===
Still's disease (AOSD) is a rheumatic disorder of unknown etiology characterized by a triad of fever, polyarthritis and evanescent rash. An idiopathic case has been reported with coeliac disease.

== Myositis ==
Some myopathies may be the indirect result of malabsorption of fat soluble vitamins such as vitamin E.

=== Dermatomyositis ===
Dermatomyositis is associated with CD in children and more recently established in adults.

== GSEA nephritis ==
Coeliac disease is associated with immune complex glomerulonephritis. Anti-gliadin IgA antibodies are found also more commonly in patients with IgA Nephropathy. The paper finds a link between GSE and IgA Nephropathy, but not between CD and nephropathy. Calcium oxalate correlates with severity of fat malabsorption in coeliac disease.

== Precancerous states ==
CD is associated with two grades of disease linked precancerous states. This condition is known as refractory coeliac disease (RCD), defined as malabsorption due to gluten-related enteropathy (villous atrophy or elevated intraepitheal lymphocytes) after initial or subsequent failure of a strict gluten-free diet (usually 1 year) and after exclusion of any disorder mimicking coeliac disease.

- RCD 1 involves precancerous tissues in which transformed T-cells continue to produce a response even though gluten is no longer present. Some RCD1 patients have been treated successfully with immunosuppressants (azathioprine, prednisone) when caught early. Elemental diet (proteins digested to amino acids) seems to be an effective alternative diet, indicating other proteins are stimulating the IEL. 5 year viability is high when treated. DQ representation is similar to non-RCD coeliacs.
- RCD 2 involves neoplastic tissues that the lack of surface expression of usual T-cell markers.
  - Increased expression of: Intracytoplasmic CD3e, Surface CD103
  - Decreased expression of: CD8, CD4, TCR-alpha/beta

Clonal T-cell expansion in RCD2 is not manageable with steroids (see: RCD 1) and sometimes manageable with chemotherapeutic drugs, however, more aggressive therapies seem more affective. A high percentage of RCD 2 patients spontaneously develop lymphoma (EATL), the 5 year survival rate is markedly lower than RCD1 but higher than lymphoma. DQ2.5/DQ2 individuals are more frequently found.

Causes of RCD.

- Coeliac disease
- Age at CD/GSE diagnosis – most people are over the age of 50 when first diagnosed at RCD
- Dietary noncompliance – Some EATL appears years after diagnosis with non-GF diets.
- Length of latency – The length of time, often unknown in which the person is GSE+.
- Severity – The severity of the microscopic destruction appears to be a factor, and genetics appears now to play a role.
- Genetics – For RCD 2 and EATL, genetics plays large role DQ2.5/DQ2+ individuals are over-represented in the patient set

== Cancers ==
GSE, particularly coeliac disease, increases the risk of cancers of specific types. There are two predominant cancers associated with coeliac disease, cancer of the esophagus and lymphoproliferative diseases such as gluten-sensitive enteropathy-associated T-cell lymphoma (EATL). For non-EATL cancers it is thought the mineralemias such as zinc and selenium may play a role in increasing risk. GSE associated cancers are invariably associated with advanced coeliac disease, however, in de-novo EATL, the cancer is frequently detected in advance of the coeliac diagnosis, also EATL is the most common neoplasm.

=== Esophageal cancer ===
Squamous carcinoma of the esophagus is more prevalent in coeliac disease. The increased prevalence may be secondary to GERD that results from chronic delayed gastric emptying. Other studies implicate the malabsorption of vitamin A and zinc as a result of multi-vitamin and mineral deficiencies seen in coeliac disease.

=== Adenocarcinoma ===
Adenocarcinoma of the bowel has been associated with coeliac disease.
