= Gluten-related disorders =

Set of diseases caused by gluten exposure

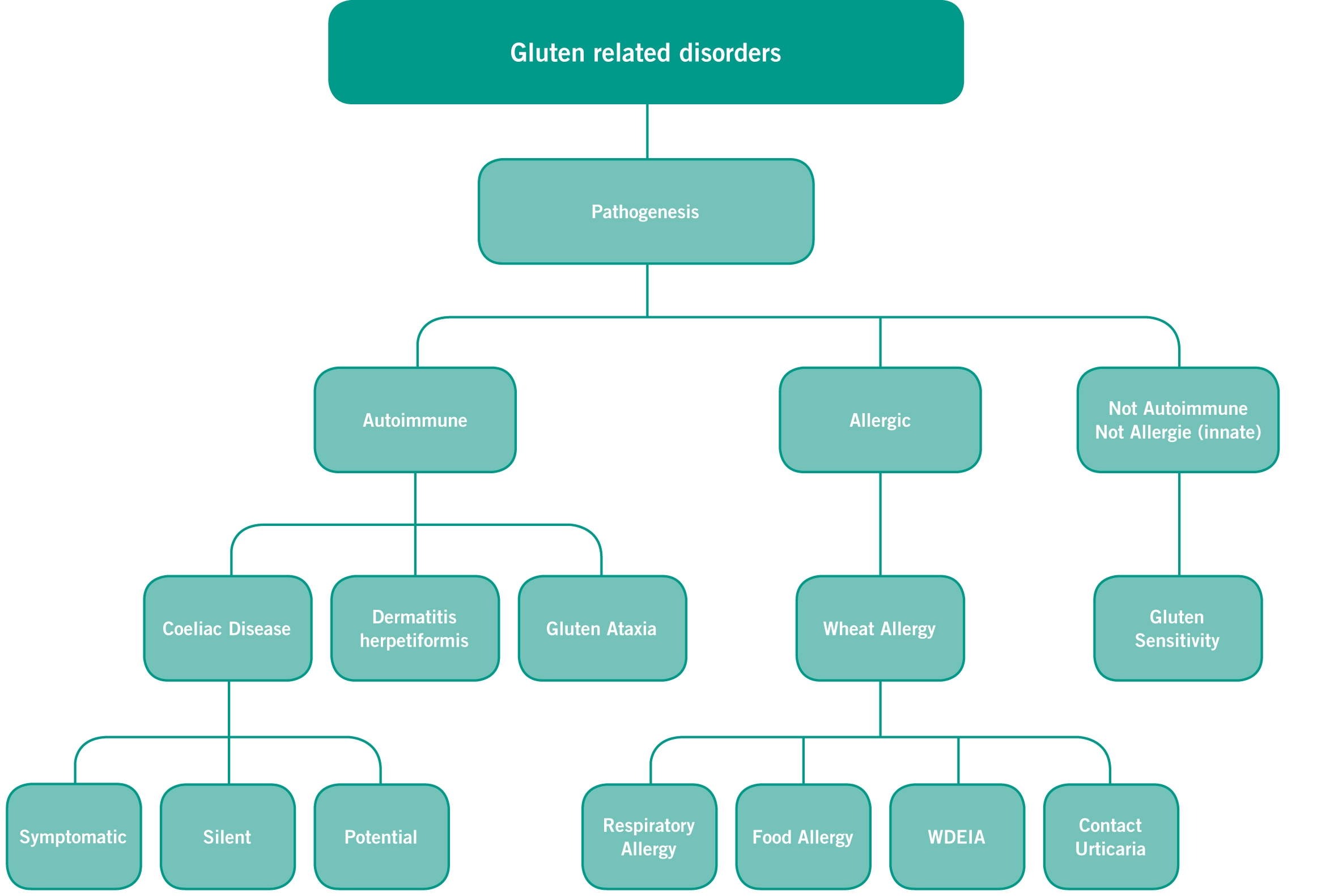
Gluten-related disorders

Gluten-related disorders is the term for the diseases triggered by gluten, including coeliac disease (CD), non-celiac gluten sensitivity (NCGS), gluten ataxia, dermatitis herpetiformis (DH) and wheat allergy. The umbrella category has also been referred to as gluten intolerance, though a multi-disciplinary physician-led study, based in part on the 2011 International Coeliac Disease Symposium, concluded that the use of this term should be avoided due to a lack of specificity.

Gluten is a group of proteins, such as prolamins and glutelins, stored with starch in the endosperm of various cereal (grass) grains.

As of 2017, gluten-related disorders were increasing in frequency in different geographic areas. The increase might be explained by the popularity of the Western diet, the expanded reach of the Mediterranean diet (which also includes grains with gluten), the growing replacement of rice by wheat in many countries, the development in recent years of new types of wheat with a higher amount of cytotoxic gluten peptides, and the higher content of gluten in bread and bakery products, due to the reduction of dough fermentation time. However, a 2020 study by the Leibniz-Institute for Food Systems Biology casts doubt on the idea that modern wheat has higher gluten levels. From a seed bank, they grew and analyzed 60 wheat cultivars from between 1891 and 2010 and found no changes in albumin/globulin and gluten contents over time. "Overall, the harvest year had a more significant effect on protein composition than the cultivar. At the protein level, we found no evidence to support an increased immunostimulatory potential of modern winter wheat."

== Types ==
The following classification of gluten-related disorders was announced in 2011 by a panel of experts in London, and published in February 2012:

- Autoimmune disorders: celiac disease, dermatitis herpetiformis, gluten ataxia
- Non-autoimmune, non-allergic: disorder with unknown cause, likely immune-modulated: non-celiac gluten sensitivity (NCGS)
- Allergic: food allergy (IgE-mediated and non-IgE-mediated), wheat dependent exercise induced anaphylaxis (WDEIA), baker's asthma, contact dermatitis.

=== Autoimmune disorders ===
Autoimmune conditions related to gluten include celiac disease, dermatitis herpetiformis, and gluten ataxia. There is research showing that in people with gluten ataxia early diagnosis and treatment with a gluten-free diet can improve ataxia and prevent its progression. The population of people with gluten ataxia and other neurological conditions appears to have a different HLA distribution, in particular more HLA-DQ1, compared to most persons with celiac disease, who have HLA-DQ2 and HLA-DQ8.

==== Coeliac disease ====
Coeliac disease (American English: celiac) (CD) is one of the most common chronic, immune-mediated disorders, triggered by the eating of gluten, a mixture of proteins found in wheat, barley, rye, and derivatives. Evidence has shown that this condition not only has an environmental component but a genetic one as well, due to strong associations of CD with the presence of HLA (Human leukocyte antigen) type II, specifically DQ2 and DQ8 alleles. These alleles can stimulate a T cell, mediated immune response against tissue transglutaminase (TTG), an enzyme in the extracellular matrix, leading to inflammation of the intestinal mucosa and eventually villous atrophy of the small intestine. This is where the innate and adaptive immune response systems collide.

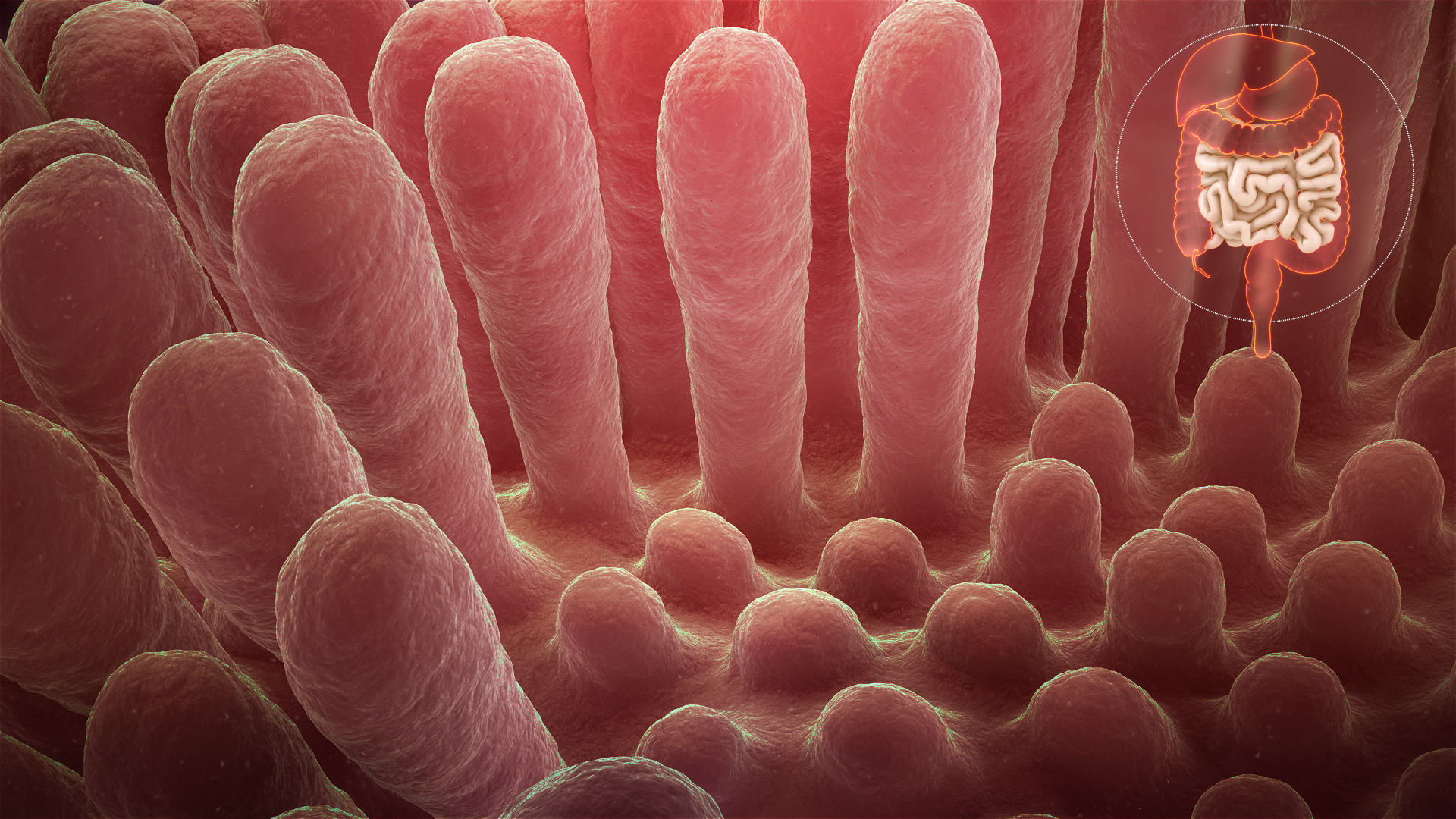
Villous atrophy of the small intestine.

CD is not only a gastrointestinal disease. It may involve several organs and cause an extensive variety of non-gastrointestinal symptoms. Most importantly, it may often be completely asymptomatic. Added difficulties for diagnosis are the fact that serological markers (anti-tissue transglutaminase [TG2]) are not always present and many people may have minor mucosal lesions, without atrophy of the intestinal villi. Diagnosis of CD should be based on a combination of person's familial history, genetics (i.e. presence of HLA DQ2/DQ8) serology and intestinal histology.

CD affects approximately 1–2% of general population all over the world, but most cases remain unrecognized, undiagnosed and untreated, and exposed to the risk of long-term complications. People may experience severe disease symptoms and be subjected to extensive investigations for many years before a proper diagnosis is achieved. Untreated CD may result in the lack of absorption of nutrients, reduced quality of life, iron deficiency, osteoporosis, an increased risk of intestinal lymphomas and greater mortality. CD is associated with some autoimmune diseases, such as diabetes mellitus type 1, thyroiditis, gluten ataxia, psoriasis, vitiligo, autoimmune hepatitis, dermatitis herpetiformis, primary sclerosing cholangitis, and more.

CD with "classic symptoms", which include gastrointestinal manifestations such as chronic diarrhea and bloating, malabsorption of certain vitamins and minerals, loss of appetite, impaired growth and even bone pain, is currently the least common presentation form of the disease. It predominantly affects small children, generally younger than two years of age.

CD with "non-classic symptoms" is the most common type clinically found, occurring in children over two years old, adolescents, and adults. It is characterized by milder or even absent gastrointestinal symptoms alongside a wide spectrum of non-intestinal manifestations that can involve any organ of the body. Some examples include cerebellar ataxia, hypertransaminasemia and peripheral neuropathy. As previously mentioned, CD very frequently may be completely asymptomatic both in children (at least in 43% of the cases) and adults.

To date, the only available medically accepted treatment for people with coeliac disease is to follow a lifelong gluten-free diet.

With continuous mass genetic modification of grain crops, for reasons such as resistance to drought and pests, the occurrence of diagnosed CD had increased by 400% in the past 50 years alone.

==== Dermatitis herpetiformis ====
Dermatitis herpetiformis (DH), or Duhring-Brocq disease, is a chronic blistering skin autoimmune condition, characterized by the presence of skin lesions that have an extensive and symmetrical distribution, predominating in areas of greater friction, and affecting mainly both elbows, knees, buttocks, ankles, and may also affect the scalp and other parts of the body, and non-symmetrical occasionally. The lesions are vesicular-crusted and when flake off, they evolve to pigmented areas or achromic an intense burning, itchy and blistering rash. Despite its name, DH is neither related to nor caused by herpes virus: the name means that it is a skin inflammation having an appearance similar to herpes.

The age of onset is variable starting in children and adolescence but can also affect individuals of both sexes indistinctly at any age of their lives.

DH can relatively commonly present with atypical manifestations, which makes its diagnosis more difficult. Some people may show erythema or severe pruritus alone, wheals of chronic urticaria, purpuric lesions resembling petechiae on hands and feet, palmo-plantar keratosis, leukocytoclastic vasculitis-like appearance, and/or lesions mimicking prurigo pigmentosa. DH may be confused with many different cutaneous lesions, such as atopic dermatitis, eczema, urticaria, scabies, impetigo, polymorphic erythema and other autoimmune blistering diseases.

DH is considered to be the "coeliac disease of the skin". For this reason, the new guidelines of the European Society for Paediatric Gastroenterology, Hepatology and Nutrition for the diagnosis of coeliac disease conclude that a proven diagnosis of DH, by itself, confirms the diagnosis of coeliac disease. Nevertheless, duodenal biopsy is recommended in doubtful cases, or if there are suspected gastrointestinal complications, including lymphoma. People with DH have different degrees of intestinal involvement, ranging from milder mucosal lesions to the presence of villous atrophy.

The main and more efficacious treatment for DH is following a lifelong gluten-free diet, which produces the improvement of skin and gut lesions. Nevertheless, the skin lesions may take several months or even years to disappear. To calm itching, dapsone is often recommended as a temporary treatment, during the time it takes for the diet to work, but it has no effect on the gastrointestinal changes and may have important side effects.

==== Gluten ataxia ====
A male with gluten ataxia: previous situation and evolution after three months of gluten-free diet

Gluten ataxia is an autoimmune disease triggered by the ingestion of gluten. With gluten ataxia, damage takes place in the cerebellum, the balance center of the brain that controls coordination and complex movements like walking, speaking and swallowing, with loss of Purkinje cells. People with gluten ataxia usually present gait abnormality or incoordination and tremor of the upper limbs. Gaze-evoked nystagmus and other ocular signs of cerebellar dysfunction are common. Myoclonus, palatal tremor, and opsoclonus-myoclonus may also appear.

Early diagnosis and treatment with a gluten-free diet can improve ataxia and prevent its progression. The effectiveness of the treatment depends on the elapsed time from the onset of the ataxia until diagnosis, because the death of neurons in the cerebellum as a result of gluten exposure is irreversible.

Gluten ataxia accounts for 40% of ataxias of unknown origin and 15% of all ataxias. Less than 10% of people with gluten ataxia present any gastrointestinal symptom, yet about 40% have intestinal damage.

=== Non-celiac gluten sensitivity (NCGS) ===
Non-celiac gluten sensitivity (NCGS), or gluten intolerance, is a syndrome in which people develop a variety of intestinal and/or extraintestinal symptoms that improve when gluten is removed from the diet, after coeliac disease and wheat allergy are excluded. NCGS, which is possibly immune-mediated, now appears to be more common than coeliac disease, with a prevalence estimated to be 6–10 times higher.

Gastrointestinal symptoms, which resemble those of irritable bowel syndrome (IBS), may include any of the following: abdominal pain, bloating, bowel habit abnormalities (either diarrhea or constipation), nausea, aerophagia, gastroesophageal reflux disease, and aphthous stomatitis.

Extra-intestinal symptoms, which can be the only manifestation of NCGS even in absence of gastrointestinal symptoms, may be any of the following: headache or migraine, "foggy mind", fatigue, fibromyalgia, joint and muscle pain, leg or arm numbness, tingling of the extremities, dermatitis (eczema or skin rash), atopic disorders, allergy to one or more inhalants, foods or metals (such as mites, graminaceae, parietaria, cat or dog hair, shellfish, or nickel), depression, anxiety, anemia, iron-deficiency anemia, folate deficiency, asthma, rhinitis, eating disorders, or autoimmune diseases.

Among extra-intestinal manifestations, NCGS seems to be involved in some neuropsychiatric disorders, principally schizophrenia, autism and peripheral neuropathy, and also ataxia and attention deficit hyperactivity disorder (ADHD).

Gluten is likely responsible for the appearance of symptoms, but it has been suggested that in a subgroup of people with NCGS and symptoms like IBS, other components of wheat and related grains (oligosaccharides like fructans), or other plant proteins contained in gluten-containing cereals (agglutinins, lectins, and amylase trypsin inhibitors (ATIs)) may play a role in the development of gastrointestinal symptoms. ATIs are about 2–4% of the total protein in modern wheat and 80–90% in gluten. In a review of May 2015 published in Gastroenterology, Fasano et al. conclude that ATIs may be the inducers of innate immunity in people with coeliac disease or NCGS. As of 2019, reviews conclude that although FODMAPs present in wheat and related grains may play a role in non-celiac gluten sensitivity, they only explain certain gastrointestinal symptoms, such as bloating, but not the extra-digestive symptoms that people with non-celiac gluten sensitivity may develop, such as neurological disorders, fibromyalgia, psychological disturbances, and dermatitis. As occurs in people with coeliac disease, the treatment is a gluten-free diet (GFD) strict and maintained, without making any dietary transgression. Whereas coeliac disease requires adherence to a strict lifelong gluten-free diet, it is not yet known whether NCGS is a permanent, or a transient condition. The results of a 2017 study suggest that NCGS may be a chronic disorder, as is the case with celiac disease. Theoretically, a trial of gluten reintroduction to observe reaction after 1–2 years of strict gluten-free diet might be advisable.

Approximately one-third of persons with NCGS continue having symptoms despite gluten withdrawal. This may be due to diagnostic error, poor dietary compliance, or other reasons. Those with NCGS may be under the impression that they do not need to follow a strictly gluten free diet. However, the ingestion of even a small amount of gluten may cause more immediate symptoms in people with NCGS as compared with those with coeliac disease. People with NCGS should carefully read ingredient labels on food and be aware of potential cross contamination as a source of gluten in otherwise gluten-free foods. To find out if there are unintended ingestions of gluten, an exhaustive evaluation with the advice of a coeliac disease specialized dietitian could be necessary.

In some cases, people can significantly improve with a low FODMAPs diet in addition to gluten withdrawal and/or a GFD with a low content of preservatives and additives. Furthermore, associated to gluten sensitivity, NCGS people may often present IgE-mediated allergies to one or more foods and it is estimated that around 35% of people with some food intolerances, mainly lactose intolerance.

=== Wheat allergy ===
People can also experience adverse effects of wheat as result of a wheat allergy. Gastrointestinal symptoms of wheat allergy are similar to those of coeliac disease and non-celiac gluten sensitivity, but there is a different interval between exposure to wheat and onset of symptoms. Wheat allergy has a fast onset (from minutes to hours) after the consumption of food containing wheat and could be anaphylaxis.

The treatment of wheat allergy consists of complete withdrawal of any food containing wheat and other gluten-containing cereals. Nevertheless, some people can tolerate barley, rye or oats.

=== Other conditions or risk factors ===
Antibodies to α-gliadin have been significantly increased in non-celiacs individuals with oral ulceration. Anti-α-gliadin antibodies are frequently found in celiac disease (CD), to a lesser degree subclinical CD, but are also found in a subset who do not have the disease. Of people with pseudo-exfoliation syndrome, 25% showed increased levels of anti-gliadin IgA. Other people that are also at risk are those taking gluten despite having the disorder, or whose family members have CD. In addition people with autoimmune conditions are also at risk for CD. It has just been found that there is a risk of death in CD. Therefore, gluten intake should be limited before or even after the diagnosis. One-fourth of people with Sjögren's syndrome had responses to gluten; of five that had positive response to gluten, only one could be confirmed as CD and another was potentially GSE, the remaining three appeared to be gluten-sensitive. All were HLA-DQ2 and/or DQ8-positive.

== Symptoms ==
More than 250 symptoms of gluten sensitivity have been reported, including bloating, abdominal discomfort or pain, constipation and diarrhea. Sensitivity may also present with extraintestinal symptoms, including headache, "brain fog", tingling and/or numbness in hands and feet, fatigue, as well as muscular disturbances and bone or joint pain; also neuropsychiatric manifestations ("gluten-sensitive idiopathic neuropathies") have been reported on.

=== Complications ===
Studies using anti-gliadin antibodies (AGA) reveal that diagnosed or untreated individuals with AGA have an increasing risk for lymphoid cancers and decreased risk for other conditions associated with affluence.

== Causes ==
When enteropathy develops in early childhood, symptomatic disease is more rapidly evident. A survey of geriatrics with celiac disease in Finland revealed that the incidence of disease was much higher than the general population. Allergic disease may rise or fall with age; certain evidence points to the increased or daily use of non-steroidal anti-inflammatory factors (aspirin, ibuprofen) as an increased risk factor for urticaria or anaphylaxis, and the sensitizing dose may include low-dose aspirin therapy used in the treatment of heart disease. NCGS may be a late-onset condition: in a prospective study performed among adults of 18 to 80 years, the median age of disease onset was found to be 55 years, with a six times higher prevalence in females than in males.

The pathogenesis of NCGS is not yet well understood. There is evidence that not only gliadin (the main cytotoxic antigen of gluten), but also other proteins named ATIs which are present in gluten-containing cereals (wheat, rye, barley, and their derivatives) may have a role in the development of symptoms. ATIs are potent activators of the innate immune system. FODMAPs, especially fructans, are present in small amounts in gluten-containing grains and have been identified as a possible cause of some gastrointestinal symptoms in persons with NCGS. As of 2019, reviews have concluded that although FODMAPs may play a role in NCGS, they only explain certain gastrointestinal symptoms, such as bloating, but not the extra-digestive symptoms that people with NCGS may develop, such as neurological disorders, fibromyalgia, psychological disturbances, and dermatitis.

=== Immunochemistry of glutens ===
Triticeae glutens are important factors in several inflammatory diseases. The immunochemistry can be subdivided into innate responses (direct stimulation of immune system), class II mediated presentation (HLA-DQ), class I mediated stimulation of killer cells, and antibody recognition. The responses to gluten proteins and polypeptide regions differs according to the type of gluten sensitivity. The response is also dependent on the genetic makeup of the human leukocyte antigen genes. In enteropathy, there are at least 3 types of recognition, innate immunity (a form of cellular immunity priming), HLA-DQ and antibody recognition of gliadin and transglutaminase. In NCGS, there is high AGA IgG in more than half of the cases. In wheat allergy, there appears to be an innate component and the response pathways are mediated through IgE against gliadin and other wheat proteins.

== Pathophysiology ==
Compared to the pathophysiology of celiac disease, the pathophysiology of NCGS is far less understood.

A literature review of 2014 found that people with NCGS "are a heterogeneous group, composed of several subgroups, each characterized by different pathogenesis and clinical history, and, probably, clinical course".

=== Genetics ===
Celiac disease (CD) and NCGS are closely linked with human leukocyte antigen (HLA) class II genes, HLA-DQ2 and HLA-DQ8, located on chromosome 6p21. Nearly all CD people are HLA-DQ2/HLA-DQ8 positive, with 95% HLA-DQ2 and the rest usually HLA-DQ8 (which is carried by 30% of Caucasians). However, the specificity of HLA-DQ2 and/or HLA-DQ8 for CD is low, with estimates ranging from 36% to 53%. In persons with NCGS, the HLA-DQ2 and/or HLA-DQ8 alleles are present in only about 50%, which is still a greater proportion than in the general population.

== Diagnosis ==
A literature review of 2014 found that non-coeliac gluten sensitivity diagnosis can be reached only by excluding celiac disease (CD) and wheat allergy.

Persons suspected of having celiac disease may undergo serological testing for IgA anti-tissue transglutaminase antibodies (abbreviated anti-tTG antibodies or anti-TG2 antibodies) and anti-endomysial antibodies (abbreviated EMA) provided the IgA-level is high, and if IgA is low, testing for certain IgG antibodies; in case of positive serological indication, a duodenal biopsy may confirm active celiac disease.

Eliminating the possibility of CD can generally also be done by adding HLA-DQ typing. The absence of HLA-DQ2 and HLA-DQ8 has a very high negative predictive value for CD, and the predictive value can be further enhanced by including HLA-DQ7.5 (HLA-DQ2 and HLA-DQ8 are found in coeliac disease 98% of the time in Caucasians, HLA-DQ7.5 present in the remaining 1.6% and only 0.4% of Caucasians are missed with the combination of these three). Without serological or HLA-DQ2/8 positivity, celiac disease is likely not present. HLA-DQ typing has a practical advantage in that it is the only diagnostic test that allows to exclude CD when a person is already on a gluten-free diet; however, as not only celiacs are HLA-DQ2/HLA-DQ8 positive, this method has a higher false positive rate than anti-TG2 and EMA antibody testing.

A four-of-five rule was proposed 2010 for confirming celiac disease, with the disease confirmed if at least four of the following five criteria are satisfied:

- typical symptoms of celiac disease;
- positivity of serum celiac disease immunoglobulin, A class autoantibodies at high titer;
- human leukocyte antigen (HLA)-DQ2 or DQ8 genotypes;
- celiac enteropathy at the small bowel biopsy; and
- response to the gluten-free diet.

For diagnosis of wheat allergy, allergy tests are available.

== Treatment ==
For people with celiac disease, a lifelong strict gluten-free diet is the only effective treatment to date;

For people diagnosed with non-celiac gluten sensitivity, there are still open questions concerning for example the duration of such a diet. The results of a 2017 study suggest that non-celiac gluten sensitivity may be a chronic disorder, as is the case with celiac disease.

For people with wheat allergy, the individual average is six years of gluten-free diet, excepting persons with anaphylaxis, for whom the diet is to be wheat-free for life.

Preferably, newly diagnosed celiacs seek the help of a dietician to receive support for identifying hidden sources of gluten, planning balanced meals, reading labels, food shopping, dining out, and dining during travel. Knowledge of hidden sources of gluten is important for people with celiac disease as they need to be very strict regarding eating only gluten-free food. The degree of gluten cross contamination tolerated by people with non-celiac gluten sensitivity is not clear but there is some evidence that they can present with symptoms even after consumption of small amounts. Sporadic accidental contaminations with gluten can reactivate movement disorders associated with non-celiac gluten sensitivity. A part of people with gluten-related neuropathy or gluten ataxia appears not to be able to tolerate even the traces of gluten allowed in most foods labeled as "gluten-free".

The inclusion of oats in gluten-free diets remains controversial. Avenin present in oats may also be toxic for individuals with celiacs. Its toxicity depends on the cultivar consumed. Furthermore, oats are frequently cross-contaminated with gluten-containing cereals.

=== Risks of non-medical and self-diagnosed adoption of a gluten-free diet ===
Withdrawing gluten from the diet without previously carrying out a complete medical examination can hamper the diagnosis of celiac disease. Diagnostic tests (antibodies and duodenum biopsies) lose their usefulness if the person is already eating a gluten-free diet.

=== Potential nutritional deficiencies ===
Gluten proteins have low nutritional value and replacing grains that contain gluten is easy from the nutritional point of view. However, an unbalanced selection of food and an incorrect choice of gluten-free replacement products may lead to nutritional deficiencies. Replacing flour from wheat or other gluten-containing cereals with gluten-free flours in commercial products may lead to a lower intake of important nutrients, such as iron and B vitamins. Some gluten-free commercial replacement products are not enriched or fortified as their gluten-containing counterparts, and often have greater lipid/carbohydrate content. Children especially often over-consume these products, such as snacks and biscuits.

Pseudocereals (quinoa, amaranth, and buckwheat) and some minor cereals are healthier alternatives to these prepared products and have higher nutritional value. Furthermore, they contain protein of higher nutritional quality than those of wheat, and in greater quantities.

Nutritional complications can be prevented by a correct dietary education.

== Epidemiology ==
In the United States, fewer cases of CD have been found compared to other countries. The incidence of celiac disease and of wheat allergy is estimated each to lie at around 1% of the population. There has been a 6.4 increase in the case reports of celiac disease between 1990 and 2009. The incidence of NCGS is unknown; some estimates range from 0.6% to 6%, and a systematic review of 2015 reported on studies with NCGS prevalence rates between 0.5% and 13%.

In Europe, the average consumption of gluten is 10g to 20g per day, with parts of the population reaching 50g or more per day.

== Histology ==
Changes in inflammatory cells affect the body, which reduces the intake of "nutrients, fat-soluble vitamins and minerals" in the body.

== Regulations ==
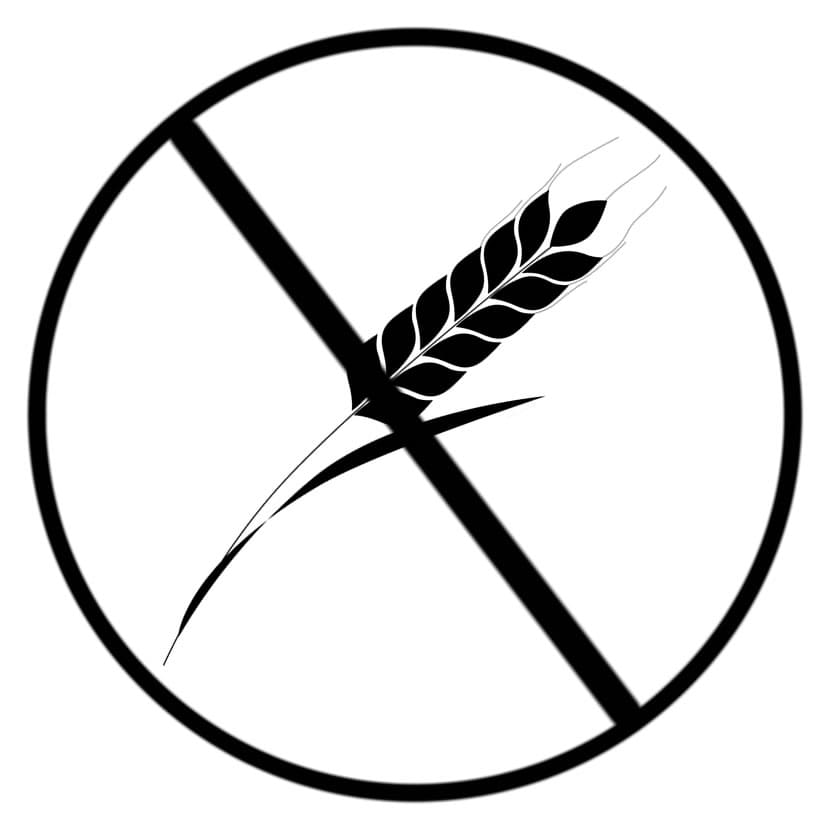
Crossed-grain symbol, similar to that of the Association Of European Coeliac Societies (AOECS)

In various countries, regulations and labelling requirements for gluten-free food products have been implemented.

For Europe, the Commission Regulation (EC) No. 41/2009 of 20 January 2009 concerning the composition and labelling of foodstuffs suitable for people intolerant to gluten has laid down harmonised rules on the content and labelling of these foodstuffs, setting out the conditions under which foods may be labelled as "gluten-free" or "very low gluten". Having entered into force on 10 February 2009 and taken effect on 1 January 2012, these rules have been repealed with effect as of 20 July 2016. The background is that, in line with the Regulation (EU) No 609/2013 on food for specific groups, gluten-free foods shall, in future, be legislated for under the EU Food Information for Consumers Regulation (Regulation (EU) No. 1169/2011). Furthermore, the Commission Implementing Regulation (EU) No 828/2014 of 30 July 2014 on the requirements for the provision of information to consumers on the absence or reduced presence of gluten in food extends the rules of Regulation (EC) 41/2009 on "gluten-free" and "very low gluten" statements also to non pre-packed foods such as those served in restaurants. The implementing regulation also clarifies how consumers are to be informed of the difference between foods that are naturally free of gluten and products that are specially formulated for gluten-intolerant persons.

Recognition of gluten-free packaged foods is facilitated by the crossed-grain symbol, representing a crossed ear of wheat. The symbol is used as a logo that facilitates food shopping for people with CD and other gluten-related disorders. The symbol, which is protected as a trademark in Europe and the United States and is covered by worldwide copyright, can be represented in any colour.

== Research ==
Research has attempted to discern, by double-blind placebo-controlled trials, between a "fad component" to the recent popularity of the gluten-free diet and an actual sensitivity to gluten or other components of wheat.

In a 2013 double-blind, placebo-controlled challenge (DBPC) by Biesiekierski et al. in a few people with irritable bowel syndrome, the authors found no difference between gluten or placebo groups and the concept of NCGS as a syndrome was questioned. Nevertheless, this study had design errors and an incorrect selection of participants, and probably the reintroduction of both gluten and whey protein had a nocebo effect similar in all people, and this could have masked the true effect of gluten/wheat reintroduction.

In a 2015 double-blind placebo cross-over trial, small amounts of purified wheat gluten triggered gastrointestinal symptoms (such as abdominal bloating and pain) and extra-intestinal manifestations (such as foggy mind, depression and aphthous stomatitis) in self-reported NCGS. Nevertheless, it remains elusive whether these findings specifically implicate gluten or proteins present in gluten-containing cereals.

A 2016 review of the recent research advancements in understanding diet's role in attenuating IBS patient's symptoms concluded that gluten was a common trigger. However, because on the different compounds responsible for symptoms, many patients that could be inaccurately labelled non-coeliac gluten sensitive; and it may be more appropriate to use nomenclature such as "non-coeliac wheat sensitive" (NCWS), "non-coeliac wheat protein sensitive" (NCWPS), or even FODMAP sensitive when referring to these patients.

In a 2018 double-blind, crossover research study on 59 persons on a gluten-free diet with challenges of gluten, fructans or placebo, intestinal symptoms (specifically bloating) were borderline significantly higher after challenge with fructans, in comparison with gluten proteins (P=0.049). Although the differences between the three interventions was very small, the authors concluded that fructans (the specific type of FODMAP found in wheat) are more likely to be the cause of NCGS gastrointestinal symptoms, rather than gluten. In addition, fructans used in the study were extracted from chicory root, so it remains to be seen whether the wheat fructans produce the same effect.

== See also ==
- List of allergies
- Vomitoxin, a mycotoxin which can give rise to somewhat comparable symptoms.
