= FODMAP =

Short-chain carbohydrates poorly absorbed in the small intestine

- Diagram of a Fructan, a chains of fructose molecules with a glucose end, classified as FODMAPs

FODMAPs (fermentable oligosaccharides, disaccharides, monosaccharides, and polyols) are short-chain carbohydrates that are poorly absorbed in the small intestine and ferment in the colon. They include short-chain oligosaccharide polymers of fructose (fructans) and galactooligosaccharides (stachyose, raffinose), disaccharides (lactose), monosaccharides (fructose), and sugar alcohols (polyols), such as sorbitol, mannitol, xylitol, and maltitol. Most FODMAPs are naturally present in food and the human diet, but the polyols may be added artificially in commercially prepared foods and beverages.

FODMAPs cause digestive discomfort in some people. The reasons are hypersensitivity to luminal distension or a proclivity to excess water retention and gas production and accumulation, but they do not cause intestinal inflammation. Naturally occurring FODMAPs may help avert digestive discomfort for some people because they produce beneficial alterations in the gut flora. They are not the cause of these disorders, but a low-FODMAP diet, restricting FODMAPs, might help to improve digestive symptoms in adults with fibromyalgia, irritable bowel syndrome (IBS) and other functional gastrointestinal disorders (FGID). Avoiding all FODMAPs long-term may have a detrimental impact on the gut microbiota and metabolome.

FODMAPs, especially fructans, are present in small amounts in gluten-containing grains and have been identified as a possible cause of symptoms in people with non-celiac gluten sensitivity. They are only minor sources of FODMAPs when eaten in the usual standard quantities in the daily diet. As of 2019, reviews conclude that although FODMAPs present in wheat and related grains may play a role in non-celiac gluten sensitivity, they only explain certain gastrointestinal symptoms, such as bloating, but not the extra-digestive symptoms that people with non-celiac gluten sensitivity may develop, such as neurological disorders, fibromyalgia, psychological disturbances, and dermatitis. Consuming a low FODMAP diet without a previous medical evaluation could cause health risks because it can ameliorate and mask digestive symptoms of celiac disease, delaying or avoiding its correct diagnosis and therapy.

== Absorption ==
Some FODMAPs, such as fructose, are readily absorbed in the small intestine of humans via GLUT receptors. Absorption thus depends on the appropriate expression and delivery of these receptors in the intestinal enterocyte to both the apical surface, contacting the lumen of the intestine (e.g., GLUT5), and to the basal membrane, contacting the blood (e.g., GLUT2). Improper absorption of these FODMAPs in the small intestine leaves them available for absorption by gut flora. The resultant metabolism by the gut flora leads to the production of gas and potentially results in bloating and flatulence.

Although FODMAPs can cause certain digestive discomfort in some people, not only do they not cause intestinal inflammation, but they help prevent it because they produce beneficial alterations in the intestinal flora that contribute to maintaining good colon health.

FODMAPs are not the cause of irritable bowel syndrome or other functional gastrointestinal disorders, but rather a person develops symptoms when the underlying bowel response is exaggerated or abnormal.

Fructose malabsorption and lactose intolerance may produce IBS symptoms through the same mechanism, but unlike other FODMAPs, poor absorption of fructose is found in only a minority of people. Lactose intolerance is found in most adults, except for specific geographic populations, notably those of European descent. Many who benefit from a low FODMAP diet need not restrict fructose or lactose. It is possible to identify these two conditions with hydrogen and methane breath testing, thus eliminating the necessity for dietary compliance.

== Sources in the diet ==
The significance of sources of FODMAPs varies through differences in dietary groups such as geography, ethnicity, and other factors. Commonly used FODMAPs comprise the following:

- oligosaccharides, including fructans and galactooligosaccharides
- disaccharides, including lactose
- monosaccharides, including fructose
- polyols, including sorbitol, xylitol, and mannitol

=== Fructans, galactans, and polyols ===
==== Sources of fructans ====
Sources of fructans include wheat, rye, barley, onion, garlic, Jerusalem and globe artichoke, beetroot, dandelion leaves, the white part of leeks, the white part of spring onion, brussels sprouts, savoy cabbage, and prebiotics such as fructooligosaccharides (FOS), oligofructose and inulin. Asparagus, fennel, red cabbage, and radicchio contain moderate amounts but may be eaten if the advised portion size is observed.

==== Sources of galactans ====
Pulses and beans are the main dietary sources (although green beans, canned lentils, sprouted mung beans, tofu (not silken), and tempeh contain comparatively low amounts). Supplements of the enzyme alpha-galactosidase may reduce symptoms, assuming the enzyme product does not contain other FODMAPs, such as polyol artificial sweeteners.

==== Sources of polyols ====
Polyols are found naturally in mushrooms, some fruit (particularly stone fruits), including apples, apricots, avocados, blackberries, cherries, lychees, nectarines, peaches, pears, plums, prunes, watermelon, and in some vegetables, including cauliflower, snow peas, and mange-tout peas. Cabbage, chicory, and fennel contain moderate amounts, but may be eaten in a low-FODMAP diet if the advised portion size is observed.

Polyols, specifically sugar alcohols, used as artificial sweeteners in commercially prepared food, beverages, and chewing gum, include isomalt, maltitol, mannitol, sorbitol, and xylitol.

=== Fructose and lactose ===
People following a low-FODMAP diet may be able to tolerate moderate amounts of fructose and lactose, particularly if they have lactase persistence.

== Low-FODMAP diet ==
A low-FODMAP diet consists of the global restriction of all fermentable carbohydrates (FODMAPs), and is recommended only for a short time. A low-FODMAP diet is recommended for managing patients with irritable bowel syndrome (IBS) and can reduce digestive symptoms of IBS, including bloating and flatulence.

Several studies have found a low-FODMAP diet to improve digestive symptoms in adults with irritable bowel syndrome, but its long-term use can have negative effects, because it has a detrimental impact on the gut microbiota and metabolome. It should only be used for short periods and under the advice of a specialist. More study is needed to evaluate its effectiveness in children with irritable bowel syndrome. Small studies (which are susceptible to bias) show little evidence of its effectiveness in treating functional symptoms of inflammatory bowel disease (IBD). More study is needed to assess the true impact of this diet on health.

== Role in non-celiac gluten sensitivity ==
FODMAPs present in gluten-containing grains are a possible cause of gastrointestinal symptoms in people with non-celiac gluten sensitivity, either by themselves, or in combination effect with gluten and other proteins in gluten-containing cereals, such as amylase-trypsin inhibitors (ATIs). They are only minor sources of FODMAPs when eaten in common dietary amounts. Wheat and rye may comprise a major source of fructans when consumed in large amounts.

== See also ==
- Carbohydrate metabolism
- Diet (nutrition)
- Dieting
- Digestion
- Human milk oligosaccharide
- List of diets
