= Duodenitis =

- Duodenum(marked)
- Specialty: Gastroenterology

Duodenitis is inflammation of the duodenum. It may persist acutely or chronically.

== Signs and symptoms ==
Known symptoms of duodenitis include:

- Abdominal pain
- nausea
- vomiting
- discomfort in stomach

== Causes ==
Known causes of duodenitis include:

- Helicobacter pylori infection
- Coeliac disease
- Bacterial infection
- Viral infection
- NSAIDs
- Autoimmune diseases
- Immune-mediated diseases
- Duodenal lymphocytosis
- Idiopathic

== Types ==
- Acute duodenitis
- Chronic duodenitis

== Diagnosis ==
Diagnosis is generally made by endoscopy with biopsy to evaluate histology. Review of symptoms and associated conditions is important.

== Treatment ==
Treatment is aimed at removing the irritant or infection. Helicobacter pylori infection is usually treated with antibiotics.
