= Non-celiac gluten sensitivity =

- Other names: Gluten sensitivity • Gluten intolerance
- Specialty: Gastroenterology, internal medicine, neurology
- Symptoms: Irritable bowel syndrome-like symptoms, fatigue, headache, fibromyalgia, atopic disorders, neurological diseases, psychiatric problems
- Usual onset: Any age
- Duration: lifelong
- Causes: Reaction to gluten, other proteins and FODMAPs from gluten-containing cereals
- Diagnostic method: Exclusion of celiac disease and wheat allergy, improvement with gluten withdrawal and worsening after gluten consumption
- Treatment: Gluten-free diet
- Frequency: 0.5–13%

Non-celiac gluten sensitivity (NCGS) or gluten sensitivity is a disorder which can cause both gastrointestinal and other problems.

Non-celiac gluten sensitivity is included in the spectrum of gluten-related disorders. The definition and diagnostic criteria of NCGS were debated and established by three consensus conferences. However, as of 2019, there remained much debate in the scientific community as to whether NCGS was a distinct clinical disorder.

The pathogenesis of NCGS is not well understood, but the activation of the innate immune system, the direct cytotoxic effects of gluten, and probably other wheat components, are implicated. There is evidence that not only gliadin (the main cytotoxic antigen of gluten), but also other proteins called amylase-trypsin inhibitors (ATIs) which are present in gluten-containing cereals (wheat, rye, barley, and their derivatives) may have a role in the development of symptoms. ATIs are potent activators of the innate immune system. FODMAPs, especially fructans, are present in small amounts in gluten-containing grains and have been identified as a possible cause of some gastrointestinal symptoms in NCGS patients. As of 2019, reviews have concluded that although FODMAPs may play a role in NCGS, they explain only certain gastrointestinal symptoms, such as bloating, but not the extra-digestive symptoms that people with NCGS may develop, such as neurological disorders, fibromyalgia, psychological disturbances, and dermatitis.

For these reasons, NCGS is a controversial clinical condition and some authors still question it. It has been suggested that "non-celiac wheat sensitivity" is a more appropriate term, without forgetting that other gluten-containing cereals are implicated in the development of symptoms.

NCGS is the most common syndrome of gluten-related disorders with prevalence rates between 0.5–13% in the general population. As no biomarker for diagnosing this condition is available, its diagnosis is made by exclusion of other gluten-related disorders such as celiac disease and wheat allergy. Many people have not been diagnosed following strict criteria, and there is a "fad component" to the recent rise in popularity of the gluten-free diet, leading to debate surrounding the evidence for this condition and its relationship to celiac disease and irritable bowel syndrome. People with NCGS are often unrecognized by both functional disease and celiac disease specialists, leading to a lack of adequate medical care and treatment. They often have a long history of health complaints and unsuccessful consultations with physicians, and thus many resort to a gluten-free diet and a self-diagnosis of gluten sensitivity.

== Signs and symptoms ==
Reported symptoms of NCGS are similar to those of celiac disease, with most patients reporting both gastrointestinal and non-gastrointestinal symptoms. In the "classical" presentation of NCGS, gastrointestinal symptoms are similar to those of irritable bowel syndrome, and are also not distinguishable from those of wheat allergy, but there is a different interval between exposure to wheat and onset of symptoms. Wheat allergy has a fast onset (from minutes to hours) after the consumption of food containing wheat and can be anaphylactic.

=== Gastrointestinal ===
Gastrointestinal symptoms may include any of the following: abdominal pain, bloating, bowel habit abnormalities (either diarrhea or constipation), nausea, aerophagia, and flatulence.

=== Extraintestinal ===
NCGS can cause a wide range of extraintestinal symptoms, which can be the only manifestation of NCGS in the absence of gastrointestinal symptoms. These include any of the following: headache, migraine, "foggy mind", fatigue, fibromyalgia, joint and muscle pain, leg or arm numbness, tingling of the extremities, dermatitis (eczema or skin rash), atopic disorders such as asthma, rhinitis, other allergies, depression, anxiety, iron-deficiency anemia, folate deficiency, or autoimmune diseases.

A man with gluten ataxia: previous situation and evolution after three months of gluten-free diet

NCGS is also linked to a wide spectrum of neurological and psychiatric disorders, including ataxia, schizophrenia, epilepsy, peripheral neuropathy, encephalopathy, vascular dementia, eating disorders, autism, attention deficit hyperactivity disorder (ADHD), hallucinations (so-called "gluten psychosis"), and various movement disorders (restless legs syndrome, chorea, parkinsonism, Tourette syndrome, palatal tremor, myoclonus, dystonia, opsoclonus myoclonus syndrome, paroxysms, dyskinesia, myorhythmia, myokymia).

Above 20% of people with NCGS have IgE-mediated allergy to one or more inhalants, foods, or metals, among which the most common are mites, graminaceae, parietaria, cat or dog hair, shellfish, and nickel. Approximately 35% of patients suffer other food intolerances, mainly lactose intolerance.

== Causes ==
The pathogenesis of NCGS is not yet well understood. The activation of the innate immune system, the direct cytotoxic effects of gluten, and probably the cytotoxicity of other wheat molecules are implicated. Besides gluten, other components in wheat, rye, barley, and their derivatives, including amylase-trypsin inhibitors (ATIs) and FODMAPs, may cause symptoms.

=== Gluten ===
It was hypothesized that gluten, as occurs in celiac disease, is the cause of NCGS. In addition to its ability to elicit abnormal responses of the immune system, in vitro studies on cell cultures showed that gluten is cytotoxic and causes direct intestinal damage. Gluten and gliadin promote cell apoptosis (a form of programmed cell death) and reduce the synthesis of nucleic acids (DNA and RNA) and proteins, leading to a reduction in the viability of cells. Gluten alters cellular morphology and motility, cytoskeleton organization, oxidative balance, and intercellular contact (tight junction proteins).

=== Other proteins ===
Some people may have a reaction to other proteins (α-amylase/trypsin inhibitors [ATIs]) present in gluten-containing cereals that are able to inhibit amylase and trypsin. They have been identified as the possible activator of the innate immune system in celiac disease and NCGS.

ATIs are part of the plant's natural defence against insects and may cause toll-like receptor 4 (TLR4)-mediated intestinal inflammation in humans. These TLR4-stimulating activities of ATIs are limited to gluten-containing cereals (wheat, rye, barley, and derivatives) and may induce innate immunity in people with celiac disease or NCGS. ATIs resist proteolytic digestion. ATIs are about 2%–4% of the total protein in modern wheat and are present in commercial gluten. A 2017 study in mice demonstrated that ATIs exacerbate preexisting inflammation and may also worsen it at extraintestinal sites. This may explain why there is an increase in inflammation in people with preexisting diseases upon ingestion of ATI-containing grains.

Modern wheat cultivation, by breeding for high ATI content, may play a role in the onset and course of disorders such as celiac disease and gluten sensitivity. However, it has been questioned whether there is sufficient empirical evidence to support this claim, because as of 2018 we lack studies that directly compare modern wheat versus ancient cultivars with low ATI content (such as einkorn wheat) in people with NCGS.

Wheat germ agglutinin is also considered to be a possible trigger of NCGS-like symptoms.

=== FODMAPs ===
FODMAPs (fermentable oligosaccharides, disaccharides, monosaccharides and polyols) that are present in gluten-containing grains (mainly fructans) have been identified as a possible cause of gastrointestinal symptoms in people with NCGS, in place of, or in addition to, gluten.

The amount of fructans in gluten-containing cereals is relatively small, and their role has been controversial. In rye, they account for 3.6%–6.6% of dry matter, 0.7%–2.9% in wheat, and barley contains only trace amounts. They are only minor sources of FODMAPs when eaten in the usual standard amounts in the daily diet. Wheat and rye may comprise a major source of fructans when consumed in large amounts. They may cause mild wheat intolerance at most, limited to certain gastrointestinal symptoms, such as bloating, but do not justify the NCGS extradigestive symptoms.

A 2018 review concluded that although fructan intolerance may play a role in NCGS, it only explains some gastrointestinal symptoms, but not the extradigestive symptoms that people with NCGS may develop, such as neurological disorders, fibromyalgia, psychological disturbances, and dermatitis. FODMAPs cause digestive symptoms when the person is hypersensitive to luminal distension. A 2019 review concluded that wheat fructans can cause certain IBS-like symptoms, such as bloating, but are unlikely to cause immune activation or extra-digestive symptoms. Many people with NCGS report resolution of their symptoms after removing gluten-containing cereals while continuing to eat fruits and vegetables with high FODMAP content.

== Diagnosis ==
Absence of reliable biomarkers and the fact that some people do not have digestive symptoms make the recognition and diagnosis of non-celiac gluten sensitivity (NCGS) difficult.

Diagnosis is generally performed only by exclusion criteria. NCGS diagnostic recommendations have been established by several consensus conferences. Exclusion of celiac disease and wheat allergy is important because these two conditions also appear in people who experience symptoms similar to those of NCGS, which improve with a gluten withdrawal and worsen after gluten consumption.

The onset of NCGS symptoms may be delayed hours to a few days after gluten ingestion, whereas in celiac disease it can take days to weeks. Wheat allergy has a fast onset (from minutes to hours) after the consumption of food containing wheat and can lead to anaphylaxis.

The presence of related extraintestinal manifestations has been suggested to be a feature of NCGS. When symptoms are limited to gastrointestinal effects, there may be an overlap with wheat allergy, irritable bowel syndrome (IBS), and (less likely) intolerance to FODMAPs.

Proposed criteria for a diagnosis of NCGS suggest an improvement of gastrointestinal symptoms and extra-intestinal manifestations higher than 30% with a gluten-free diet (GFD), assessed through a rating scale, is needed to make a clinical diagnosis of NCGS. To exclude a placebo effect, a double-blind placebo-controlled gluten challenge is a useful tool, although it is expensive and complicated for routine clinical use, and so is usually performed in research studies.

These suggestions were incorporated in the Salerno expert consensus on diagnostic criteria for NCGS. These recommend assessment of the response to a 6-week trial of a gluten-free diet using a defined rating scale (Step 1), followed by a double-blind, placebo-controlled challenge of gluten (or placebo) for a week of each (Step 2). A variation of greater than 30% in the main symptoms when challenged by gluten or placebo is needed for a positive result. Further research on possible biomarkers was also identified.

=== Differential diagnosis ===
Examinations evaluating celiac disease and wheat allergy should be performed before patients remove gluten from their diet. It is critical to make a clear distinction between celiac disease and NCGS.

==== Celiac disease ====
The main goal in diagnosing NCGS is to exclude celiac disease. NCGS and celiac disease cannot be separated in diagnosis because many gastrointestinal and non-gastrointestinal symptoms are similar in both diseases, and there are people with celiac disease having negative serology (absence of specific celiac disease antibodies in serum) or without villus atrophy. There is no test capable of eliminating a diagnosis of a celiac disease, but such a diagnosis is unlikely without confirming HLA-DQ2 and/or HLA-DQ8 haplotypes.

The prevalence of undiagnosed celiac disease has increased fourfold during the past half-century, with most cases remaining unrecognized, undiagnosed, and untreated, leaving celiac patients at risk of long-term complications. Some people with NCGS may indeed have celiac disease. A 2015 systematic review found that 20% of people with NCGS presenting with HLA-DQ2 and/or HLA-DQ8 haplotypes, negative serology, and normal histology or duodenal lymphocytosis had celiac disease.

The presence of autoimmune symptoms in people with NCGS suggests the possibility of undiagnosed celiac disease. Autoimmune diseases typically associated with celiac disease are diabetes mellitus type 1, thyroiditis, gluten ataxia, psoriasis, vitiligo, autoimmune hepatitis, dermatitis herpetiformis, primary sclerosing cholangitis, and others.

To evaluate the possible presence of celiac disease, specific serology and duodenal biopsies are required while the person is still on a diet that includes gluten.

===== Serological markers =====
Serological CD markers (IgA tissue transglutaminase [tTGA], IgA endomysial [EmA] and IgG deamidated gliadin peptide [DGP] antibodies) are always negative in those with NCGS; in addition to specific IgA autoantibody levels, it is necessary to determine total IgA levels. IgG tTGA antibodies should be checked in selective IgA deficiency, which can be associated with celiac disease and occurs in as many as one in 40 celiac patients.

Nevertheless, the absence of serological markers does not certainly exclude celiac disease. In those with celiac disease before diagnosis (on a gluten-containing diet), celiac disease serological markers are not always present. As the age of diagnosis increases, these antibody titers decrease, and may be low or even negative in older children and adults. The absence of celiac disease-specific antibodies is more common in patients without villous atrophy who only have duodenal lymphocytosis (Marsh 1 lesions) and who respond to a gluten-free diet with histological and symptomatic improvement.

===== Duodenal biopsies =====
According to the diagnostic criteria established by the consensus conferences (2011 and 2013), it is necessary to perform duodenal biopsies to exclude celiac disease in symptomatic people with negative specific celiac disease antibodies. Because of the patchiness of the celiac disease lesions, four or more biopsies are taken from the second and third parts of the duodenum, and at least one from the duodenal bulb. Even in the same biopsy fragments, different degrees of pathology may exist.

Duodenal biopsies in people with NCGS are always almost normal – an essential parameter for diagnosis of NCGS, although it is generally accepted that a subgroup of people with NCGS may have an increased number of duodenal intraepithelial lymphocytes (IELs) (≥25/100 enterocytes), which represent Marsh I lesions. Nevertheless, Marsh I is considered compatible with celiac disease and the most frequent cause of these findings, especially in people positive for HLA DQ2 and/or DQ8 haplotypes, is celiac disease, with a prevalence of 16-43%.

In people with duodenal lymphocytosis – following guidelines from the European Society of Pediatric Gastroenterology, Hepatology and Nutrition (ESPGHAN) – a high count of celiac disease cells (or CD/CD3 ratio) in immunohistochemical assessment of biopsies, or the presence of IgA anti-TG2 and/or anti-endomysial intestinal deposits, might be specific markers for celiac disease. Catassi and Fasano proposed in 2010 that in patients without celiac disease antibodies, either lymphocytic infiltration associated with IgA subepithelial deposits or a histological response to a gluten-free diet, could support a diagnosis of celiac disease.

==== Wheat allergy ====
The clinical presentation may be sufficient in most cases to distinguish a wheat allergy from other entities. It is excluded when there are normal levels of serum IgE antibodies to gluten proteins and wheat fractions, and no skin reaction to prick tests for wheat allergy. Nevertheless, these tests are not always completely reliable.

If an allergic reaction can not be clearly identified, the diagnosis should be confirmed by food provocation tests, ideally performed in a double-blinded and placebo-controlled manner. Delayed allergic reactions may occur with these types of tests, which have to be negative over time, but there are no international consensus statements on diagnosing delayed wheat/food-related symptoms. Usually, reactions that appear between two hours and five days after the oral challenge are considered delayed. Mucosal challenge followed by confocal endomicroscopy is a complementary diagnostic technique, but this technology is not yet generally available and remains experimental.

=== Other tests ===
Evaluating the presence of antigliadin antibodies (AGA) can be a useful complementary diagnostic test. Up to 50% NCGS patients may have elevated AGA IgG antibodies, but rarely AGA IgA antibodies (only 7% of the cases). In these patients, unlike in those with celiac disease, the IgG AGA became undetectable within six months of following a gluten-free diet.

=== People already on a gluten-free diet ===
Many people remove gluten from their diet after a long history of health complaints and unsuccessful consultations with numerous physicians, who simply consider them to be suffering from irritable bowel syndrome, and some may eliminate gluten before seeking medical attention. This fact can diminish the CD serological markers titers and may attenuate the inflammatory changes found in the duodenal biopsies.

In these cases, patients should be tested for the presence of HLA-DQ2/DQ8 genetic markers because a negative HLA-DQ2 and HLA-DQ8 result has a high negative predictive value for celiac disease. If these markers are positive, it is advisable to undertake a gluten challenge under medical supervision, followed by serology and duodenal biopsies. However, gluten challenge protocols have significant limitations, because a symptomatic relapse generally precedes the onset of a serological and histological relapse, and therefore becomes unacceptable for many patients. Gluten challenge is also discouraged before the age of five and during pubertal growth.

It remains unclear what daily intake of gluten is adequate and how long the gluten challenge should last. Some protocols recommend eating a maximum of 10 g of gluten per day for six weeks. Nevertheless, recent studies have shown that a two-week challenge of 3 g of gluten per day may induce histological and serological abnormalities in most adults with proven celiac disease. This new proposed protocol has shown higher tolerability and compliance. It has been calculated that its application in secondary-care gastrointestinal practice would identify celiac disease in 7% of patients referred for suspected NCGS, while the remaining 93% would be confirmed as NCGS; this is not yet universally adopted.

For people on a gluten-free diet who are unable to perform an oral gluten challenge, an alternative to identify possible celiac disease is an in vitro gliadin challenge of small bowel biopsies, but this test is only available at selected specialized tertiary-care centers.

== Treatment ==
After excluding celiac disease and wheat allergy, the subsequent step to diagnose and treat NCGS is to start a strict gluten-free diet (GFD) to assess if symptoms improve or resolve completely. This may occur within days to weeks of starting a GFD, but improvement may also be due to a non-specific, placebo response. The recovery of the nervous system is slow and sometimes incomplete.

Recommendations may resemble those for celiac disease, for the diet to be strict and maintained, with no transgression. The degree of gluten cross contamination tolerated by people with NCGS is not clear but there is some evidence that they can present with symptoms even after consumption of small amounts. Sporadic accidental contaminations with gluten can reactivate movement disorders. A part of people with gluten-related neuropathy or ataxia appear not to be able to tolerate even the traces of gluten allowed in most foods labeled as "gluten-free".

Whereas celiac disease requires adherence to a strict lifelong gluten-free diet, it is not yet known whether NCGS is a permanent or a transient condition. The results of a 2017 study suggest that NCGS may be a chronic disorder, as is the case with celiac disease. A trial of gluten reintroduction to observe any reaction after one to two years of a strict gluten-free diet might be performed.

A strict gluten-free diet is effective in most of the neurological disorders associated with NCGS, ameliorating or even resolving the symptoms. It should be started as soon as possible to improve the prognosis. The death of neurons in the cerebellum in ataxia is the result of gluten exposure and is irreversible. Early treatment with a strict gluten-free diet can improve ataxia symptoms and prevent its progression. When dementia has progressed to an advanced degree, the diet has no beneficial effect. Cortical myoclonus appears to be treatment-resistant on both a gluten-free diet and immunosuppression.

=== Persistent symptoms ===
Approximately one-third of presumed NCGS patients continue to have symptoms, despite gluten withdrawal. Apart from a possible diagnostic error, there are multiple possible explanations.

One reason is poor compliance with gluten withdrawal, whether voluntary and/or involuntary. There may be ingestion of gluten, in the form of cross contamination or food containing hidden sources. In some cases, the amelioration of gastrointestinal symptoms with a gluten-free diet is only partial, and these patients could significantly improve with the addition of a low-FODMAP diet.

A subgroup may not improve when eating commercially available gluten-free products, as these can be rich in preservatives and additives such as sulfites, glutamates, nitrates and benzoates, which can also have a role in triggering functional gastrointestinal symptoms. Furthermore, people with NCGS may often present with IgE-mediated allergies to one or more foods. It has been estimated that around 35% suffer other food intolerances, mainly lactose intolerance.

== History ==
The subject of "food intolerance", including gluten sensitivity and elimination diets, was discussed in 1976.

Patients with symptoms including abdominal pain and diarrhea, which improved on gluten withdrawal, and who did not have celiac disease were initially described in 1976 and 1978, with the first series in 1980. Debate regarding the existence of a specific condition has continued since then. The three consensus conferences held since 2010 have produced consistent definitions of NCGS and its diagnostic criteria.

== Society and culture ==
NCGS has been a topic of popular interest. Gluten has been named "the new diet villain". The gluten-free diet has become popular in the United States and other countries. Clinicians worldwide have been challenged by an increasing number of people who do not have celiac disease nor wheat allergy, with digestive or extra-digestive symptoms which improved after removing wheat/gluten from the diet. Many of these persons began a gluten-free diet on their own, without having been previously evaluated.

Another reason that contributed to this trend was the publication of several books that demonize gluten and point to it as a cause of type 2 diabetes, weight gain and obesity, and a broad list of conditions ranging from depression and anxiety to arthritis and autism. The book that has had the most impact is Grain Brain: The Surprising Truth about Wheat, Carbs, and Sugar – Your Brain's Silent Killers, by the American celebrity doctor David Perlmutter, published in September 2013. Another book that has had great impact is Wheat Belly: Lose the Wheat, Lose the Weight, and Find Your Path Back to Health, by cardiologist William Davis. The gluten-free diet has also been advocated and followed by many celebrities to lose weight, such as Miley Cyrus and Gwyneth Paltrow, and some elite athletes to improve performance.

Estimates suggest that in 2014, 30% of people in the US and Australia were consuming gluten-free foods, with estimates that by 2016, approximately 100 million Americans would consume gluten-free products. Data from a 2015 Nielsen survey of 30,000 adults in 60 countries around the world showed that 21% of people prefer to buy gluten-free foods, with interest highest among younger generations. Many people may be avoiding gluten unnecessarily.

Debate around NCGS as a genuine clinical condition can be heightened because often patients are self-diagnosed, or a diagnosis is made by alternative health practitioners. Many people who are making a gluten-free diet did not previously exclude celiac disease or, when they are fully evaluated, other alternative diagnoses can be found such as fructose intolerance or small intestinal bacterial overgrowth, or a better response to a low-FODMAP diet obtained.

== Research ==
There are many open questions on gluten sensitivity, emphasized in one review that "it is still to be clarified whether this disorder is permanent or transient and whether it is linked to autoimmunity". It has not yet been established whether innate or adaptive immune responses are involved in NCGS, nor whether the condition relates specifically to gluten or rather relates to other components of grains.

Studies indicate that AGA IgG is high in slightly more than half of NCGS patients and that, unlike for celiac disease patients, the IgG AGA decreases strongly over 6 months of gluten-free diet; AGA IgA is usually low or absent in NCGS patients.

The need for developing biomarkers for NCGS is frequently emphasized; for example, one review indicated: "There is a desperate need for reliable biomarkers ... that include clinical, biochemical and histopathological findings which support the diagnosis of NCGS."

Research has also attempted to discern, by double-blind placebo-controlled trials, between a "fad component" to the recent popularity of the gluten-free diet and an actual sensitivity to gluten or other components of wheat. In a 2013 double-blind, placebo-controlled challenge (DBPC) by Biesiekierski et al. in 37 people with NCGS and IBS, the authors found no difference between gluten or placebo groups, and the concept of NCGS as a syndrome was questioned. However, it is possible that the reintroduction of both gluten and whey protein had a nocebo effect similar in all people, and this could have masked the true effect of gluten/wheat reintroduction.

In a 2015 double-blind placebo crossover trial, small amounts of purified wheat gluten triggered gastrointestinal symptoms (such as abdominal bloating and pain) and extra-intestinal manifestations (such as foggy mind, depression, and aphthous stomatitis) in self-reported NCGS. Nevertheless, it remains elusive whether these findings specifically implicate gluten or proteins present in gluten-containing cereals, because the research didn't provide data on extraction and whether ATIs were removed.

In a 2018 double-blind, crossover research study on 59 persons on a gluten-free diet with challenges of gluten, fructans or placebo, intestinal symptoms (specifically bloating) were borderline significantly higher after challenge with fructans, in comparison with gluten proteins (P = 0.049). Although the differences between the three interventions were tiny, the authors concluded that fructans (the specific type of FODMAP found in wheat) are more likely to be the cause of NCGS gastrointestinal symptoms, rather than gluten. In addition, fructans used in the study were extracted from chicory root, so it remains to be seen whether the wheat fructans produce the same effect.

== See also ==
- Gluten-related disorders
