= Clinical test =

Clinical test may refer to:

- Diagnostic test
- Clinical trial
