= Gluten challenge test =

Test diagnosing gluten-related disorders

- Synonyms: Gluten challenge
- Purpose: Diagnose gluten-related disorders

The gluten challenge test is a medical test in which gluten-containing foods are consumed and (re-)occurrence of symptoms is observed afterwards to determine whether and how much a person reacts to these foods. The test may be performed in people with suspected gluten-related disorders in very specific occasions and under medical supervision, for example in people who had started a gluten-free diet without performing duodenal biopsy.

Gluten challenge is discouraged before the age of 5 years and during pubertal growth.

Gluten challenge protocols have significant limitations because a symptomatic relapse generally precedes the onset of a serological and histological relapse, and therefore becomes unacceptable for most patients.

== History ==
Before serological and biopsy-based diagnosis of coeliac disease was available, a gluten challenge test was a prerequisite for diagnosis of coeliac disease.

Today, with serological testing (determination of coeliac disease-specific antibodies in the blood) and duodenal biopsy with histological testing being available for diagnosing coeliac disease, patients with suspected coeliac disease are strongly advised to undergo both serological and biopsy testing before undertaking a gluten-free diet. People who present minor damage of the small intestine often have negative blood antibodies titers and many patients with coeliac disease are missed when a duodenal biopsy is not performed. Serologic tests have a high capacity to detect coeliac disease only in patients with total villous atrophy and have very low capacity to detect cases with partial villous atrophy or minor intestinal lesions with normal villi. Currently, gluten challenge is no longer required to confirm the diagnosis in patients with intestinal lesions compatible with coeliac disease and a positive response to a gluten-free diet. Nevertheless, in some cases, a gluten challenge with a subsequent biopsy may be useful to support the diagnosis, for example in people with a high suspicion for coeliac disease, without a biopsy confirmation, who have negative blood antibodies and are already on a gluten-free diet. Gluten challenge is discouraged before the age of 5 years and during pubertal growth. European guidelines suggest that in children and adolescents with symptoms which are compatible with coeliac disease, the diagnosis can be made without the need for an intestinal biopsy if anti-tTG antibodies titres are very high (10 times the upper limit of normal).

A recently proposed criterion to non-coeliac gluten sensitivity diagnosis concludes that an improvement of gastrointestinal symptoms and extra-intestinal manifestations higher than 50% with a gluten-free diet, assessed through a rating scale, may confirm the clinical diagnosis of non-coeliac gluten sensitivity. Nevertheless, this rating scale, is not yet applied worldwide. To exclude a placebo effect, a double-blind placebo-controlled gluten challenge is a useful tool, although it is expensive and complicated in routine clinical ground, and therefore, is only performed in research studies.

== Testing ==
The test is also frequently used in clinical trials, for example for assessing the efficacy of novel drugs for patients with coeliac disease.

Medical guidelines for performing a gluten challenge vary in terms of the recommended dose and duration of the test.

=== Preparation ===
In order to be able to assess the results of the gluten challenge, the patient needs to have been on a gluten-free diet beforehand, with symptoms having disappeared sufficiently for allowing for a subsequent re-appearance of symptoms under gluten challenge to be observed.

=== Procedure ===
It remains unclear what daily intake of gluten is adequate and how long the gluten challenge should last. Some protocols recommend eating a maximum of 10 g of gluten per day for 6 weeks. Nevertheless, recent studies have shown that 2-week challenge of 3 g of gluten per day may induce histological and serological abnormalities in most adults with proven coeliac disease. This newly proposed protocol has shown higher tolerability and compliance, and it has been calculated that its application in secondary-care gastrointestinal practice would identify celiac disease in 7% patients referred for suspected non-coeliac gluten sensitivity, while in the remaining 93% would confirm non-coeliac gluten sensitivity, but is not yet universally adopted. A double-blind placebo-controlled gluten challenge can be performed by means of capsules containing gluten powder (or wheat powder) or a placebo, respectively, although it is expensive and complicated in routine clinical ground, and therefore, is only performed in research studies. Longer challenges might be necessary in some people especially in adults.

There are indications that patients with non-coeliac gluten sensitivity show a reappearance of symptoms in far shorter time than is the case for coeliac disease: in non-coeliac gluten sensitivity, symptoms usually relapse in a few hours or days of gluten challenge.

In cases of suspected coeliac disease, a gastrointestinal biopsy is performed at the end of the gluten challenge. For an alternative diagnosis of non-coeliac gluten sensitivity, the reappearance of symptoms is assessed. However, there is no agreement so far as to how to perform a non-coeliac gluten sensitivity symptom evaluation after a gluten challenge.

For people eating a gluten-free diet who are unable to perform an oral gluten challenge, an alternative to identify a possible celiac disease is an in vitro gliadin challenge of small bowel biopsies, but this test is available only at selected specialized tertiary-care centers.

== Variations ==
For determining whether certain foods such as oats can be tolerated by certain patients, a gradual challenge may be performed.
