= Fructose malabsorption =

- Other names: Dietary fructose intolerance
- Chemical structure of fructose
- Specialty: Endocrinology

Fructose malabsorption, formerly named dietary fructose intolerance (DFI), is a digestive disorder in which absorption of fructose is impaired by deficient fructose carriers in the small intestine's enterocytes. This results in an increased concentration of fructose. Intolerance to fructose was first identified and reported in 1956.

Similarity in symptoms means that patients with fructose malabsorption often fit the profile of those with irritable bowel syndrome.

Fructose malabsorption is not to be confused with hereditary fructose intolerance, a potentially fatal condition in which the liver enzymes that break up fructose are deficient. Hereditary fructose intolerance is quite rare, affecting up to 1 in 20,000 to 30,000 people.

== Symptoms and signs ==
Fructose malabsorption may cause gastrointestinal symptoms such as abdominal pain, bloating, flatulence or diarrhea.

== Pathophysiology ==
Fructose is absorbed in the small intestine without help of digestive enzymes. Even in healthy persons, however, only about 25–50 g of fructose per sitting can be properly absorbed. People with fructose malabsorption absorb less than 25 g per sitting. Simultaneous ingestion of fructose and sorbitol seems to increase malabsorption of fructose. Fructose that has not been adequately absorbed is fermented by intestinal bacteria producing hydrogen, carbon dioxide, methane and short-chain fatty acids. This abnormal increase in hydrogen may be detectable with the hydrogen breath test.

The physiological consequences of fructose malabsorption include increased osmotic load, rapid bacterial fermentation, altered gastrointestinal motility, the formation of mucosal biofilm and altered profile of bacteria. These effects are additive with other short-chain poorly absorbed carbohydrates such as sorbitol. The clinical significance of these events depends upon the response of the bowel to such changes. Some effects of fructose malabsorption are decreased tryptophan, folic acid and zinc in the blood.

Restricting dietary intake of free fructose and/or fructans may provide symptom relief in a high proportion of patients with functional gut disorders.

== Diagnosis ==
The diagnostic test, when used, is similar to that used to diagnose lactose intolerance. It is called a hydrogen breath test and is the method currently used for a clinical diagnosis. Nevertheless, some authors argue this test is not an appropriate diagnostic tool, because a negative result does not exclude a positive response to fructose restriction, implying a lack of sensitivity.

== Treatment ==
=== Physical activity (avoiding sitting down for long periods) ===
Sitting down can cause your abdomen to compress, which slows down digestion. This can lead to issues such as bloating, heartburn and constipation. It could thus increase or cause fructose malabsorption. A study shows that physical activity between long periods of sitting is not enough: "focusing on acquiring the recommended dose of exercise is not strong enough of a stimulant to completely protect the body from physical inactivity the other 23+ h/day". "Reducing prolonged overall sitting time may reduce metabolic disturbances"

=== Dietary supplements ===
Xylose isomerase acts to convert fructose sugars into glucose. Dietary supplements of xylose isomerase may improve some symptoms of fructose malabsorption, although there is currently only a single scientific study available.

=== Diet ===
There is no known cure, but an appropriate diet and the enzyme xylose isomerase can help. The ingestion of glucose simultaneously with fructose improves fructose absorption and may prevent the development of symptoms. For example, people may tolerate fruits such as grapefruits or bananas, which contain similar amounts of fructose and glucose, but apples are not tolerated because they contain high levels of fructose and lower levels of glucose. But a randomised controlled trials in patients with fructose malabsorption (made by the Cochrane institute) found that "Adding glucose to food and solutions to enhance fructose absorption is not effective in preventing fructose-induced functional gastrointestinal symptoms".

Foods that should be avoided by people with fructose malabsorption include:

- Foods and beverages containing greater than 0.5 g fructose in excess of glucose per 100 g and greater than 0.2 g of fructans per serving should be avoided. Foods with >3 g of fructose per serving are termed a 'high fructose load' and possibly present a risk of inducing symptoms. However, the concept of a 'high fructose load' has not been evaluated in terms of its importance in the success of the diet.
- Foods with high fructose-to-glucose ratio. Glucose enhances absorption of fructose, so fructose from foods with fructose-to-glucose ratio <1, like white potatoes, are readily absorbed, whereas foods with fructose-to-glucose ratio >1, like apples and pears, are often problematic regardless of the total amount of fructose in the food.
- Foods rich in fructans and other fermentable oligo-, di- and mono-saccharides and polyols (FODMAPs), including artichokes, asparagus, leeks, onions, and wheat-containing products, including breads, cakes, biscuits, breakfast cereals, pies, pastas, pizzas, and wheat noodles.

The role that fructans play in fructose malabsorption is still under investigation. However, it is recommended that fructan intake for fructose malabsorbers should be kept to less than 0.5 grams/serving, and supplements with inulin and fructooligosaccharide (FOS), both fructans, should be avoided.

- Foods containing artificial sweeteners like sorbitol (present in some diet drinks and foods and occurring naturally in some stone fruits), xylitol (present in some berries) and other polyols (sugar alcohols, such as erythritol, mannitol and other ingredients that end with -tol, commonly added as in commercial foods).
- Foods containing high fructose corn syrup.

Foods with a high glucose content ingested with foods containing excess fructose may help patients absorb the excess fructose.

==== Foods with high fructose content ====
According to the USDA database, foods with more fructose than glucose include:

Food	Fructose (grams / 100 grams)	Glucose (grams / 100 grams)	Fructose/Glucose Ratio
Sucrose (for reference)	50	50	1
Apples	5.9	2.4	2.46
Pears	6.2	2.8	2.21
Fruit juice e.g. Apples, Pears	5–7	2–3	~2.4
Watermelon	3.4	1.6	2.13
Raisins	29.8	27.8	1.07
Honey	40.9	35.7	1.15
High fructose corn syrup (dry mass)	42–55	45–58	.72-1.22
Mango	4.68	2.01	2.33
Agave nectar	55.6	12.43	4.47
Ginger	1.78	1.22	1.46

The USDA food database reveals that many common fruits contain nearly equal amounts of the fructose and glucose, and they do not present problems for those individuals with fructose malabsorption. Some fruits with a greater ratio of fructose than glucose are apples, pears and watermelon, which contain more than twice as much fructose as glucose. Fructose levels in grapes varies depending on ripeness and variety, where unripe grapes contain more glucose.

=== Dietary guidelines for management ===
Researchers at Monash University in Australia developed dietary guidelines for managing fructose malabsorption, particularly for individuals with IBS.

==== Unfavorable foods (i.e. more fructose than glucose) ====
- Fruit – apple, pear, honeydew melon, nashi pear, pawpaw, papaya, quince, star fruit, watermelon;
- Dried fruit – apple, currant, date, fig, pear, raisin, sultana;
- Fortified wines
- Foods containing added sugars, such as agave nectar, some corn syrups, and fruit juice concentrates.

==== Favorable foods (i.e. fructose equal to or less than glucose) ====
The following list of favorable foods was cited in the paper: "Fructose malabsorption and symptoms of Irritable Bowel Syndrome Guidelines for effective dietary management". The fructose and glucose contents of foods listed on the Australian food standards would appear to indicate that most of the listed foods have higher fructose levels.

- Stone fruit: apricot, nectarine, peach, plum (caution – these fruits contain sorbitol);
- Berry fruit: blackberry, boysenberry, cranberry, raspberry, strawberry, loganberry;
- Citrus fruit: kumquat, grapefruit, lemon, lime, mandarin, orange, tangelo;
- Other fruits: ripe banana, jackfruit, passion fruit, pineapple, rhubarb, tamarillo.

== Food-labeling ==
Producers of processed food in most or all countries, including the US, are not currently required by law to mark foods containing "fructose in excess of glucose". This can cause some surprises and pitfalls for fructose malabsorbers.

Foods (such as bread) marked "gluten-free" are usually suitable for fructose malabsorbers, though they need to be careful of gluten-free foods that contain dried fruit or high fructose corn syrup or fructose itself in sugar form. However, fructose malabsorbers do not need to avoid gluten, as those with celiac disease must.

Many fructose malabsorbers can eat breads made from rye and corn flour. However, these may contain wheat unless marked "wheat-free" (or "gluten-free") (Note: Rye bread is not gluten-free.) Although often assumed to be an acceptable alternative to wheat, spelt flour is not suitable for people with fructose malabsorption, just as it is not appropriate for those with wheat allergies or celiac disease. However, some fructose malabsorbers do not have difficulty with fructans from wheat products while they may have problems with foods that contain excess free fructose.

There are many breads on the market that boast having no high fructose corn syrup. In lieu of high fructose corn syrup, however, one may find the production of special breads with a high inulin content, where inulin is a replacement in the baking process for the following: high fructose corn syrup, flour and fat. Because of the caloric reduction, lower fat content, dramatic fiber increase and prebiotic tendencies of the replacement inulin, these breads are considered a healthier alternative to traditionally prepared leavening breads. Though the touted health benefits may exist, people with fructose malabsorption will likely find no difference between these new breads and traditionally prepared breads in alleviating their symptoms because inulin is a fructan, and, again, consumption of fructans should be reduced dramatically in those with fructose malabsorption in an effort to appease symptoms.

== Research ==
Fructose and fructans are FODMAPs (fermentable oligo-, di- and mono-saccharides and polyols) known to cause gastrointestinal discomfort in susceptible individuals. FODMAPs are not the cause of these disorders, but FODMAPs restriction (a low-FODMAP diet) might help to improve short-term digestive symptoms in adults with irritable bowel syndrome (IBS) and other functional gastrointestinal disorders (FGID). Nevertheless, its long-term follow-up can have negative effects because it causes a detrimental impact on the gut microbiota and metabolome.

== See also ==
- Hereditary fructose intolerance
- Food intolerance
- Gastroenterology
- Invisible disability
