= Test panel =

A test panel is a predetermined group of medical tests used in the diagnosis and treatment of disease.

Test panels (sometimes called profiles) are typically composed of individual laboratory tests which are related in some way: by the medical condition they are intended to help diagnose (cardiac risk panel), by the specimen type (complete blood count, CBC), by the tests most frequently requested by users (comprehensive chemistry profile), by the methodology employed in the test (viral panel by polymerase chain reaction), or by the types of components included (urine drug screen).

== Advantages of diagnostic test panels over individual diagnostic tests ==
Test panels offer various advantages to laboratories performing the tests (labor efficiency, potential for automation and reduced costs through performing large numbers of the same kinds of tests each day) as well as to end users such as ordering physicians and hospitals (more comprehensive testing, rapid turn-around, and lower prices). The presence of several tests responsive to the same clinical condition may also increase the chances of detecting that condition.

== Disadvantages of test panels ==
Among the disadvantages of test panels are the inclusion of diagnostically sub-optimal tests based upon commercial availability of test reagents, cost considerations, or compatibility with the testing instruments and methods. Another disadvantage is the fact that approximately 5% of the test results can be expected to fall outside the normal (bell curve) range for purely statistical reasons. Thus, there is an expectation that the number of abnormal appearing results will increase with the number of tests in the panel (for quantitative tests such as blood glucose and total protein). For a typical twenty-test panel, there will be, on average, one or more of these apparent abnormal results.

The proportion of such apparently abnormal results may be even higher if the normal ranges printed on the report do not accurately reflect the species, gender or age of the patient. It is common for normal ranges for bodily fluid constituents to differ from the general population for very young or old patients, and in some cases (such as hormones) for males versus females. Differences in those parameters between species are more the rule than the exception.

The statistical considerations typically do not apply for qualitative (present or absent) tests, such as drug screens, unless the substance being tested for (e.g. drug) is actually present at a concentration near the cutoff concentration.

Sometimes there is a discrepancy between the test panel's contents and the written orders, which can put the laboratory in a legal and ethical bind, as they cannot report the results for a test that was not officially ordered.
