= Duodenal lymphocytosis =

Medical condition characterised by increased lymphocytes in duodenum

- Other names: Lymphocytic duodenitis, Lymphocytic duodenosis, Duodenal intraepithelial lymphocytosis
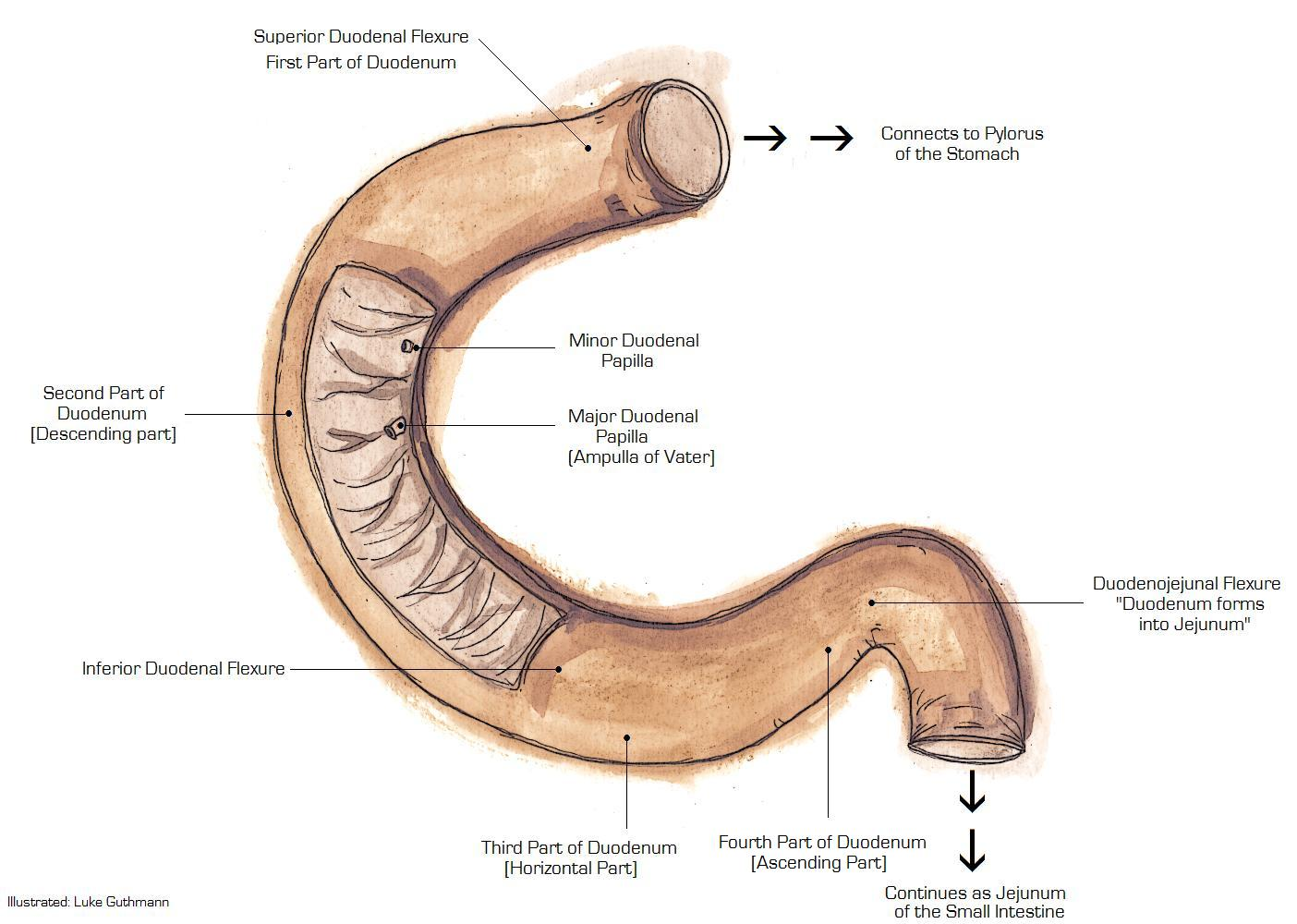
- Anatomy of duodenum
- Specialty: Gastroenterology
- Causes: Coeliac disease, environmental enteropathy and others
- Diagnostic method: Histological examination of duodenal biopsy
- Frequency: 3–7% of people having duodenal biopsy

Duodenal lymphocytosis, sometimes called lymphocytic duodenitis, lymphocytic duodenosis, or duodenal intraepithelial lymphocytosis, is a condition where an increased number of intra-epithelial lymphocytes is seen in biopsies of the duodenal mucosa when these are examined microscopically. This form of lymphocytosis is often a feature of coeliac disease but may be found in other disorders.

== Presentation ==
The condition is characterised by an increased proportion of lymphocytes in the epithelium of the duodenum, usually when this is greater than 20–25 per 100 enterocytes. Intra-epithelial lymphocyte (IEL) are normally present in intestine and numbers are normally greater in the crypts and in the jejunum; these are distinct from those found in the lamina propria of the intestinal mucosa. IELs are mostly T cells. Increased numbers of IELs are reported in around 3% of in duodenal biopsies, depending on case mix, but may be increasingly being found, in up to 7%.

== Causes ==
The list of possible causes is wide, including coeliac disease, environmental enteropathy (tropical sprue), autoimmune enteropathy, small intestinal bacterial overgrowth, NSAID damage, Helicobacter pylori, other infections and Crohn's disease.

== Diagnosis ==
Diagnosis is made by accurate counting of intraepithelial lymphocytes during histological examination of the duodenum. The definition of the condition includes the requirement that the duodenal histological appearances are otherwise unremarkable, specifically with normal villous architecture.

In coeliac disease (also known as gluten-sensitive enteropathy), duodenal lymphocytosis is found in untreated or partially treated cases. This is the least severe type of change, known as the Marsh I stage, in the classification of histological changes in coeliac disease. Additional features including villous atrophy and crypt hyperplasia are the other findings in other Marsh stages of coeliac disease.

Antibodies associated with coeliac disease were reported in around 11% of cases. These IgA endomysial antibodies and anti-transglutaminase antibodies are very sensitive and specific for coeliac disease implying that this proportion of duodenal lymphocytosis cases has definite coeliac disease. Around 33% of cases have the HLA-DQ2 allele, which is found in over 90% of people with coeliac disease. Absence of HLA-DQ2 (and the rarer HLA-DQ8) makes coeliac disease most unlikely. As antibody-negative coeliac disease is recognised, HLA status, persistence or progression of the duodenal IEL numbers following a gluten challenge, followed by symptomatic improvement on a gluten-free diet, has been used to be more certain about the diagnosis, which was made in 22% of one series of over 200 adult cases.

Helicobacter infection is a common finding at endoscopy and although duodenal IEL counts were found to be slightly higher with this infection, this was not considered to be a meaningful cause in children. Other infections, including Cryptosporidiosis and Giardiasis can also be associated with an increase in IELs.

== Management ==
The management is that of any identified associated disorder such as a gluten free diet for cases with coeliac disease or treatment of associated infections.

== Prognosis ==
When duodenal lymphocytosis is associated with other features of coeliac disease, in particular positive antibodies, or HLA-DQ2/8 and a family history, treatment with a gluten-free diet produces an improvement in IEL numbers. Diarrhoea, thyroiditis, weakness and folate deficiency were other predictors of the development of gluten sensitivity and coeliac disease, which developed in 23 of 85 patients over 2 years in one series.
