= Anti-gliadin antibodies =

Prolamin found in wheat

Anti-gliadin
Common antibody characteristics
- Antigen source: Triticum aestivum

Isoform-specific characteristics of α/β-gliadin
- Antigen gene: Gli-X2
- Affected organ(s): Intestine (Small)
- Also affected: Epithelial extracellular matrix
- Associated disease(s): Coeliac disease
- Antibody class: IgA, IgG
- HLA associations: DQ2.5, DQ8, DQ2.2/DQ7.5

Isoform-specific characteristics of γ-gliadin
- Antigen gene: Gli-X3
- Affected organ(s): (See α/β-gliadin)
- Associated disease(s): Coeliac disease
- Antibody class: IgA, IgG
- HLA associations: DQ2.5, DQ8, DQ2.2/DQ7.5

Isoform-specific characteristics of ω-gliadin
- Biological source: & Aegilops speltoides
- Antigen gene: Gli-B1
- Affected organ(s): Vascular, Respiratory
- Affected tissue(s): Serum, Dermis
- Affected cells(s): Mast cells, Eosinophils
- Associated disease(s): EIA, Baker's Allergy
- Antibody class: IgE

Anti-gliadin antibodies are produced in response to gliadin, a prolamin found in wheat. In bread wheat it is encoded by three different alleles, AA, BB, and DD. These alleles can produce slightly different gliadins, which can cause the body to produce different antibodies. Some of these antibodies can detect proteins in specific grass taxa such as Triticeae (Triticeae glutens), while others react sporadically with certain species in those taxa, or over many taxonomically defined grass tribes.

== Subtypes ==
=== Anti-gliadin IgA ===
This antibody is found in ~80% of patients with coeliac disease. It is directed against the alpha/beta and gamma (α,β,γ) gliadins. It is also found in a number of patients who are not enteropathic. Some of these patients may have neuropathies that respond favorably to a gluten elimination diet. This is referred to as gluten-sensitive idiopathic neuropathy. Clinically these antibodies and IgG antibodies to gliadin are abbreviated as AGA.

=== Anti-gliadin IgG ===
The IgG antibody is similar to AGA IgA, but is found at higher levels in patients with the IgA-less phenotype. It is also associated with coeliac disease and non-celiac gluten sensitivity.

Anti-gliadin antibodies are frequently found with anti-transglutaminase antibodies.

=== Anti-gliadin IgE ===
The IgE antibodies are more typically found in allergy-related conditions such as urticaria, asthma, and wheat-dependent exercise-induced anaphylaxis. The target of the most allergenic antibodies is ω-5 gliadin, which is encoded by the Gli-1B gene found on the B haplome (Aegilops speltoides derived) of wheat.

== Diagnostic serology ==
Anti-gliadin antibodies were one of the first serological markers for coeliac disease. Problematic with AGA is the typical sensitivity and specificity was about 85%. Gliadin peptides which are synthesized as the deamidated form have much higher sensitivity and specificity, creating 2 serological tests for CD that approach biopsy diagnostic in performance.

== Uses in testing ==
Anti-gliadin antibodies can be generated in mice or rabbits by immunizing whole purified gliadins, proteolytic fragments of gliadin, or synthetic peptides that represent epitopes of gliadin. After developing an immune response, B-cells from mice can be fused with immortalizing cells to form a hybridoma that produces monoclonal antibodies (Mab or MoAb). Mab can be expressed in culture or via ascites fluid production to produce large amounts of a single antibody isoform.

Mab can be used to detect levels of gluten in food products. Some of these antibodies can recognize only wheat prolamins or very closely related grass seeds; others can detect antigens over broad taxa. The G12 antibody is the newest example which detects the most immunotoxic fragment, a 33-mer peptide from α-2 gliadin; available from Romer Laboratories and the Spanish company Biomedal. It recognizes the toxic fraction of wheat, barley, rye and also of oat.

The R5 sandwich assay is another such assay. This assay can recognize wheat, barley and rye, which makes it ideal for evaluating the presence of contaminants in gluten-free foods that do not contain oat. This antibody is a recommended testing protocol in a proposed revision of the Codex Alimentarius.

The new standards came about in part because of new sensitive and specific testing procedures. These procedures are capable of detecting wheat or multiple cereals at concentrations as low as 1 part per million (PPM or 1 mg/kg). A new barley-sensitive ELISA called the R5 sandwich assay does not detect gluten in any of 25 pure oat varieties, but it does detect barley, wheat and rye.
