= Bloating =

- Specialty: Gastroenterology
- Symptoms: Blood in stool; Weight loss; Nausea; Vomiting; Diarrhea; Stomach pain
- Duration: A few hours to days
- Causes: Overeating; Menstrual cycle; Food intolerance; Irritable bowel syndrome (IBS); Gas-producing foods; Ultra-processed foods; Hormones
- Risk factors: Diarrhea; Vomiting; Unintentional weight loss
- Prevention: Eating high fiber foods; Drinking water; Exercise
- Treatment: Most cases do not require serious medical treatment; Over-the-counter drugs
- Frequency: 10–25% of healthy people; 75% of women experience bloating before or during their period; 18% experience bloating regularly

Abdominal bloating (or simply bloating) is a short-term disease that affects the gastrointestinal tract. Bloating is generally characterized by an excess buildup of gas, air or fluids in the stomach. A person may have feelings of tightness, pressure or fullness in the stomach; it may or may not be accompanied by a visibly distended abdomen. Bloating can affect anyone of any age range and is usually self-diagnosed. In most cases it does not require serious medical attention or treatment. Although the term bloating is usually used interchangeably with abdominal distension, these symptoms probably have different pathophysiological processes, which are not fully understood.

The first step for management is to find a treatment for the underlying causes that produce it through a detailed medical history and a physical examination. The discomfort can be alleviated by the use of certain drugs and dietary modifications.

Bloating can also be caused by chronic conditions and in rare cases can be a reoccurring life-threatening problem.

== Symptoms and signs ==
The most common symptom associated with bloating is a sensation that the abdomen is full or distended. Rarely, bloating may be painful or cause shortness of breath.

Pains that are due to bloating will feel sharp and cause the stomach to cramp. These pains may occur anywhere in the body and can change locations quickly. They are so painful that they are sometimes mistaken for heart pains when they develop on the upper left side of the chest. Pain on the right side is often confused with problems in the appendix or the gallbladder.

One symptom of gas that is not normally associated with it is the hiccup. Hiccups are harmless and will diminish on their own; they also help release gas in the digestive tract before it moves into the intestines, which can cause bloating. Important but uncommon causes of abdominal bloating include ascites and tumors.

== Causes ==
There are many causes of bloating, including: diet, irritable bowel syndrome, lactose intolerance, reflux, and constipation. Specific medical conditions like Crohn's disease or bowel obstruction can also contribute to the amount of stomach bloating experienced.

Common causes of abdominal bloating are:

- Overeating
- Gastric distension
- Lactose intolerance, fructose intolerance and other food intolerances
- Premenstrual syndrome
- Food allergy
- Aerophagia (air swallowing, a nervous habit)
- Irritable bowel syndrome
- Celiac disease
- Non-celiac gluten sensitivity
- Partial bowel obstruction
- Gastric dumping syndrome or rapid gastric emptying
- Gas-producing foods
- Constipation
- Visceral fat
- Splenic-flexure syndrome
- Menstruation, dysmenorrhea
- Polyendocrine metabolic ovarian syndrome (PMOS) and ovarian cysts
- Alvarez' syndrome, bloating of unknown or psychogenic origin without excess gas in the digestive tract
- Massive infestation with intestinal parasites (e.g., Ascaris lumbricoides)
- Diverticulosis
- Certain medications, such as phentermine
- Occurs in some due to salivary hypersecretion and dehydration.
- Ovarian cancer

Important but uncommon causes of abdominal bloating include:

- Large cancerous intra-abdominal tumors of the ovary, liver, uterus and stomach
- Megacolon, an abnormal dilation of the colon caused by some diseases, such as Chagas disease, a parasitic infection
- Cardiopulmonary resuscitation procedures, due to the artificial mouth-to-mouth insufflation of air.

In animals, causes of abdominal bloating include:

- Gastric dilatation volvulus, a condition of dogs which occurs when gas is trapped inside the stomach and gastric torsion prevents it from escaping
- Ruminal tympany, a condition of ruminant animals which occurs when gas cannot escape from the rumen.

All the factors mentioned contribute to bloated stomach abdominal pain.

Every person produces gases in their body during the digestion of food, such as methane, hydrogen, carbon dioxide, and nitrogen. And some of them are released outside the body, sometimes in small quantities that one does not notice and sometimes in larger quantities that may affect the normal course of life.

=== Fiber ===
Most cases of stomach bloating are due to improper diet. Gas occurs because of the bacteria in the colon and is a by-product of soluble fiber digestion. Inadequate or irregular intake of fiber and water will cause a person to experience bloating or constipation. The most common natural sources of fiber include fruits and vegetables as well as wheat or oat bran. These fibers are most likely to cause flatulence. Fiber is made by plants and is not easily digested by the human gastrointestinal tract. There are two main types of dietary fiber: soluble and insoluble fiber. Soluble fiber is prebiotic and readily fermented in the colon into gases, while insoluble fiber is metabolically inert and absorbs water as it moves through the digestive system, aiding in defecation. Most types of fiber (insoluble) are attached to body water in the intestine and increase the volume of stools.

=== Bowel gas ===
Gas in the gastrointestinal tract has only two sources. It is either swallowed air or is produced by bacteria that normally inhabit the intestines, primarily the colon.

Belching or burping is a universal ability that works by removing gas from the stomach through the mouth. The stomach can become bloated when too much air is swallowed during eating and drinking too quickly. As the stomach swells, belching removes the gas and alleviates the pain associated with it. Burping can also be used as a form of relief from abdominal discomfort other than too much gas in the stomach.

Flatulence, or farting, provides relief of much the same kind as burping, but involves the passage of gas from the body via the anus, not the mouth. Bacteria present in the intestinal tract cause gas that is expelled from the anus. They produce the gas as food is digested and moved from the small intestine. This gas builds up and causes swelling or bloating in the abdominal area before it is released.

=== Constipation ===
A common gastrointestinal problem is constipation—infrequent bowel movements, hard stools, or strain during the movements—which causes serious cases of bloating. Since most cases of constipation are temporary, simple lifestyle changes, such as getting more exercise and increasing one's intake of fiber, can contribute to alleviating constipation. Some cases of constipation will continue to worsen and require unconventional methods to release the feces and reduce the amount of stomach bloating. Blood in the stool, intense pain in the abdomen, rectal pain, unexplained weight loss, and continued bloating and constipation not relieved by the above lifestyle changes should be reported to a doctor. Bloating consistently accompanies constipation, and they will not develop without an underlying cause.

=== Heartburn and acid reflux ===
Painful burning sensations in the chest that are caused by gastroesophageal reflux is known as heartburn. Reflux is the backflow of gastric acid juices from the stomach into the oesophagus. Heartburn has different triggers, including certain foods, medications, obesity, and stress. These triggers are different for each individual. Gastroesophageal reflux disease or GERD is a chronic condition that can lead to more serious complications like esophageal cancer. Treatment options are available to treat the symptoms and the condition, but there is no cure for the disease. Symptoms include burping, abdominal and stomach bloating, along with pain and discomfort. Heavy meals, lying down or bending over after eating should be avoided to help prevent reflux from occurring. The stomach bloating experienced with reflux is intense and will remain until the food is digested all the way.

Postmortem bloating occurs in cadavers, due to the formation of gases by bacterial action and putrefaction of the internal tissues of the abdomen and the inside of the intestines.

=== Related conditions ===
Conditions that are related to bloating include constipation, lactose intolerance, and acid reflux disease. All of these conditions share the same symptoms and can share the same causative agents. These causes include unhealthy diet, smoking, alcohol consumption, low amount of exercise, and overall health. Each of these conditions can be experienced as a symptom of the others and is also a cause for each of them. In most cases where one of the conditions is present, there is at least one if not two of the others. Treatment for each condition is performed using the same medications and recommended dietary changes like increased fiber intake and reduced fat intake. If the conditions develop into diseases such as gastroesophageal reflux disease or chronic constipation, additional medications will be required. Bloating and flatulence are sometimes related to constipation, and treating the underlying condition may be helpful.

== Treatment ==
=== Diets ===
The efficacy of the low-FODMAP diet in abdominal bloating has been studied in multiple trials in people with irritable bowel syndrome and compared with other diets. Significant benefits have been demonstrated, particularly on bloating, distension and abdominal pain severity. The low-FODMAP diet has the best evidence for any diet intervention in IBS, especially improving bloating. This diet is most effective when led by a dietitian, with restriction, reintroduction and personalizaton phases.

=== Medications ===
There are many over-the-counter (OTC) medications that can be used to treat bloating. Food enzymes can be found in some products that will help break down the sugars found in grains, vegetables and dairy products. They can be taken before food is consumed or added to the food that causes the gas and bloating. The most common treatment is antacids. These medications have no effect on the gas that is present in the intestines but enable gas build-up to be belched away more easily, reducing the amount of bloating that develops. Another treatment is simethicone, an oral anti-foaming agent that helps the body to expel the gas more quickly. Combinations of prokinetics, such as domperidone + metoclopramide + diphenhydramine (the latter for the prevention of extrapyramidal reactions, especially acute dystonic reactions) + proton pump inhibitors (PPIs), have dramatic effects on bloaters and belchers especially.

== See also ==
- Tympany
