= Fructan =

Fructose polymer

Structural formula of inulins, linear fructans with a terminal α-D-glucose with 1→2 linkage

A fructan is a polymer of fructose molecules. Fructans with a short chain length are known as fructooligosaccharides. Fructans can be found in over 12% of the angiosperms including both monocots and dicots such as agave, artichokes, asparagus, leeks, garlic, onions (including spring onions), yacón, jícama, barley and wheat.

Fructans also appear in grass, with dietary implications for horses and other grazing animals (Equidae).

== Types ==
Fructans are built up of fructose residues, normally with a sucrose unit (i.e. a glucose–fructose disaccharide) at what would otherwise be the reducing terminus. The linkage position of the fructose residues determine the type of the fructan. There are five types of fructans.

Linkage normally occurs at one of the two primary hydroxyls (OH-1 or OH-6), and there are two basic types of simple fructan:

- 1-linked: in inulin, the fructosyl residues are linked by β-2,1-linkages
- 6-linked: in levan and phlein, the fructosyl residues are linked by β-2,6-linkages

A third type of fructans, the graminin type, contains both β-2,1-linkages and β-2,6-linkages.

Two more types of fructans are more complex: they are formed on a 6G-kestotriose backbone where elongations occur on both sides of the molecule. Again two types are discerned:

- neo-inulin type (also called "inulin neoseries"): predominant β-2,1-linkages
- neo-levan type (also called "levan neoseries"): predominant β-2,6-linkages

== Functions ==
Fructans are important storage polysaccharides in the stems of many species of grasses and confer a degree of freezing tolerance. A notable exception is rice, which is unable to synthesise fructans.

In barley, fructan accumulates in the cell vacuoles and acts as a carbon sink within the cell to facilitate photosynthesis. Fructan reserves are transported to the reproductive tissue during grain filling, and to the vegetative tissues during periods of growth.

Chicory inulin-type fructans are used mainly as the raw materials for industrial production of fructans as food ingredients. Use in the food industry is based on the nutritional and technological properties of fructans as a prebiotic dietary fiber.

== Fructan content of various foods ==
Agave	7–25%
Jerusalem artichoke	16.0–20.0%
Globe artichoke	2.0–6.8%
Asparagus	1.4–4.1%
Barley kernels (very young)	22%
Garlic	17.4%
Onion	1.1–10.1%
Rye (bran)	7%
Rye (grain)	4.6–6.6%
Wheat bread (white)	0.7–2.8%
Wheat flour	1–4%
Wheat pasta	1–4%

== See also ==
- Dietary fiber – Portion of plant-derived food that cannot be completely digested
- Prebiotic (nutrition) – Nutritional chemicals that help growth of microorganisms
