= Anti-transglutaminase antibodies =

Autoantibodies

Autoantibody
Anti-transglutaminase
Common autoantibody characteristics
Autoantibody class	IgA, IgG
	DQ2.5
HLA associations	DQ8
	DQ2.2/DQ7.5
Associated T-Cell restrictions	DQ/gliadin, DQ/deamidated-gliadin
Triggering agent(s)	Triticeae glutens (Prolamins and Glutelins)
Isoform specific
autoantibody characteristics
Autoantigen; Isoform	Tissue transglutaminase
Autoantigen Gene	TGM2
Affected Organ(s)	Intestine (small)
Affected Tissue(s)	Villi
Affected Cells(s)	Epithelial Cells
Also Affected	Epithelial matrix
Associated; Disease(s)	Celiac disease
Triggering agent	& Gastrointestinal viruses
Autoantigen; Isoform	Epidermal transglutaminase
Autoantigen Gene	TGM3
Affected Organ(s)	Skin
Associated; Disease(s)	Dermatitis herpetiformis

Anti-transglutaminase antibodies (ATA) are autoantibodies against the transglutaminase protein. Detection is considered abnormal, and may indicate one of several conditions.

Antibodies serve an important role in the immune system by detecting cells and substances that the rest of the immune system then eliminates. These cells and substances can be foreign (for example, viruses) and also can be produced by the body (for example, cancer cells). Antibodies against the body's own products are called autoantibodies. Autoantibodies can sometimes errantly be directed against healthy portions of the organism, causing autoimmune diseases.

ATA can be classified according to 2 different schemes: transglutaminase isoform and immunoglobulin reactivity subclass (IgA, IgG) toward transglutaminases.

== Transglutaminase isoform reactivity ==
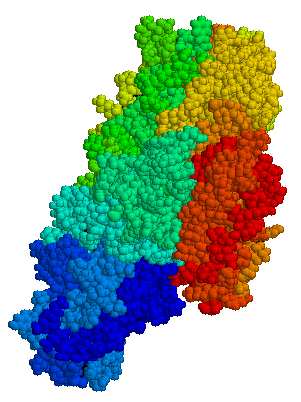
transglutaminase

=== Anti-tissue transglutaminase ===
Antibodies to tissue transglutaminase (abbreviated as anti-tTG or anti-TG2) are found in patients with several conditions, including celiac disease, juvenile diabetes, inflammatory bowel disease, and various forms of arthritis.

In celiac disease, ATA are involved in the destruction of the villous extracellular matrix and target the destruction of intestinal villous epithelial cells by killer cells. Deposits of anti-tTG in the intestinal epithelium predict celiac disease.

=== Anti-endomysial reactivity ===
The endomysium is a layer of connective tissue that ensheaths a muscle fiber. The endomysium contains a form of transglutaminase called "tissue transglutaminase" or "tTG" for short, and antibodies that bind to this form of transglutaminase are called endomysial autoantibodies (EmA). The antiendomysial antibody test is a histological assay for patient serum binding to esophageal tissue from primate. EmA are present in celiac disease. They do not cause any direct symptoms to muscles, but detection of EmA is useful in the diagnosis of the disease.

=== Anti-epidermal transglutaminase ===
Antibodies to epidermal transglutaminase (eTG, also keratinocyte transglutaminase) are the autoantibodies believed to cause dermatitis herpetiformis.

== Immunoglobin subclass ==
ATA IgA are more frequently found in Celiac Disease (CD); however, ATA IgG are found in CD and at higher levels when affected individual had the IgA-less phenotype. The IgA-less phenotype is more common in CD than the normal population; however, one haplotype, DQ2.5 is found in most CD, has genetic linkage to the IgA-less gene location.

== Associated conditions ==
=== Celiac disease ===
Most attention to anti-transglutaminase antibodies is given with respect to celiac disease. A recent study of children published in 2007 demonstrated that the level of ATA in correlates with the scalar Marsh score for the disease in the same patient.

High levels (titers) of ATA are found in almost all instances of celiac disease. Given the association of ATA with celiac disease, and the prevalence of the latter, it is estimated that ~1% of the population have potentially pathogenic levels of ATA.

=== Inflammatory bowel disease ===
A study published in Nature in 2001 found high levels of anti-transglutaminase antibodies in inflammatory bowel disease, specifically in Crohn's disease and ulcerative colitis.

=== Arthritis ===
Studies of patients with various forms of arthritis showed highly increased frequencies of antibodies against guinea pig transglutaminase, human recombinant transglutaminase and peptidylarginine deiminase type 4 (PAD4). This suggests a potential for crossreactive antibodies between anti-tTG and anti-PAD4.

=== Type 1 Diabetes, previously known as Juvenile diabetes and anti-tTG ===
Childhood (male) type 1 diabetes (T1D) increases the risk for CD and vice versa and the early signs of celiac disease may precede T1D in many cases. A search for CD in juvenile diabetes patients revealed that a gluten-free diet resulted in some improvements. An elevated number of diabetes patients have ATA along with increased numbers of gluten-specific T-cells.

=== Asymptomatic ATA+ ===
A 2007 screening of 7550 Britons found 87 undetected ATA+. In this study a 50% increase of ATA was associated with:

- lower bone mineral density of the hip.
- lower hemoglobin levels
- decreased weight.
- lower cholesterol
- higher blood glucose

Similar studies:

- increased mortality, particularly to cancer

=== Symptomatic ATA+ ===
- greater impairment of neurophysiology (peripheral neuropathies and motor neuron disease.
- increased inflammatory bowel symptoms (not celiac or EMA).

=== Alcohol consumption ===
ATA correlated with biomarkers of alcohol consumption, proinflammatory cytokines and markers of fibrogenesis.

== Mechanism of autoimmunity ==
The antibodies to tissue transglutaminase follow a complex pathway of generation. For most antigens, T-cells specific to those antigens develop; for autoimmunity, either autoreactive T-cells are not suppressed, or antigens escape the protective process. T-cells are stimulated by antigen, presented by MHC molecules (HLA in humans) on antigen-reactive B-cells. These T-helper cells then stimulate B-cells to multiply and mature into plasma cells that make IgA and IgG to that protein.

In the case of celiac disease, the current understanding is that tTG autoimmunity arises when T-cells are generated against wheat gliadin and similar gluten proteins made by a class of grasses called Triticeae, which includes wheat (See Wheat taxonomy), barley, and rye. The T-cells are defined by the ability to react to HLA-DQ8 and DQ2.5 restricted antigens and gliadin is one of the antigens. Gliadin is a favored dietary substrate for transglutaminase because of many enzyme reaction sites on gliadin. In disease, transglutaminase reacts with gliadin forming a linkage. In forming this bond transglutaminase becomes linked to T-cell epitopes on gliadin. B-cells with surface IgM that react to transglutaminase can present it with bound gliadin peptides to T-cells which stimulate B-cell maturation and proliferation to plasma cells making IgA or IgM.

ATA changes the behavior of tTG. Some studies have revealed that antibodies increase the activity of tTG, instead of inhibiting activity as is commonly encountered with function-altering antibodies. A recent study has shown that ATA also modify and increase replication in intestinal epithelial Cells, by apparently interacting with cell-surface transglutaminase.
