= Wheat allergy =

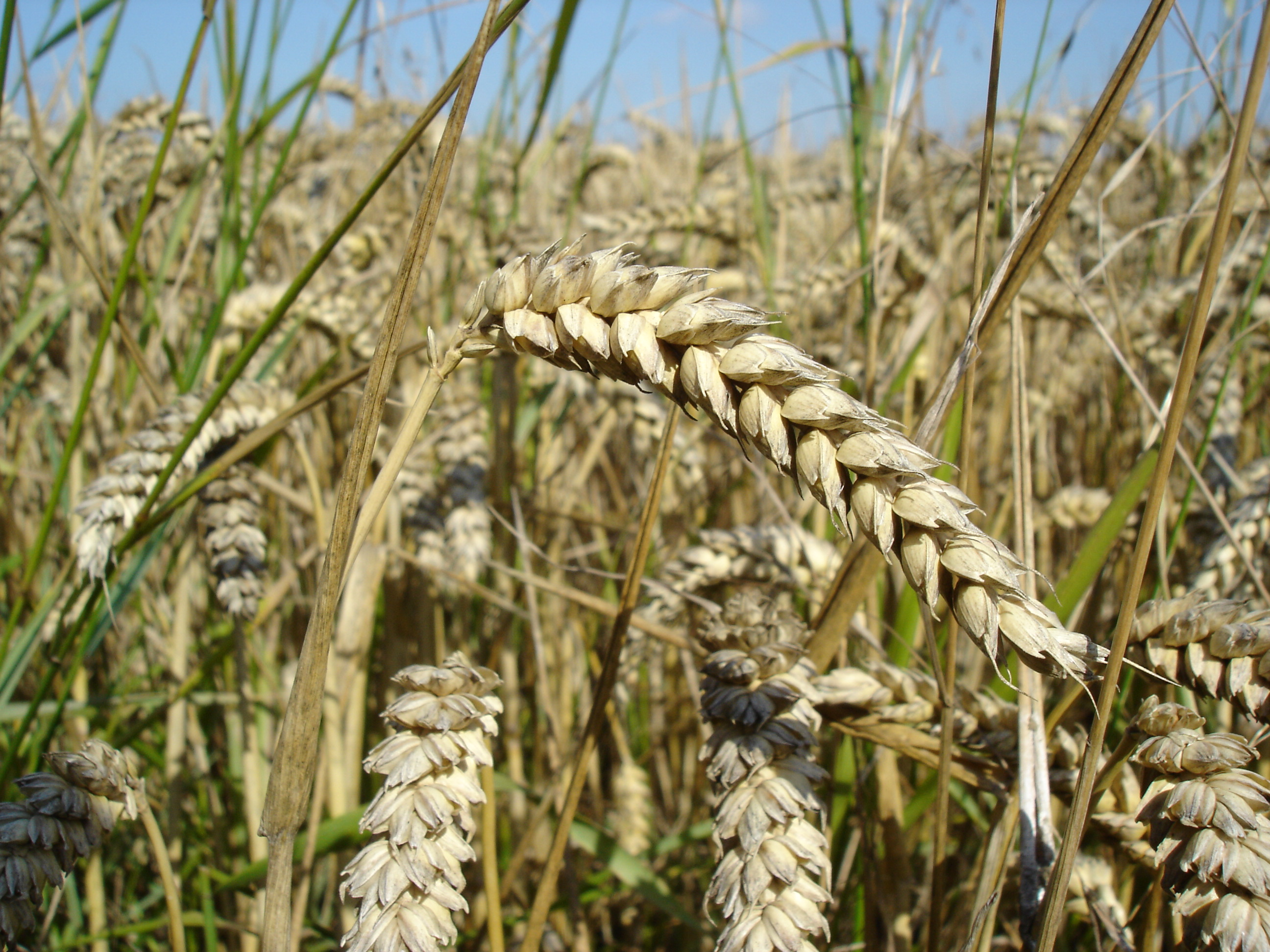
- Wheat
- Specialty: Immunology

Wheat allergy is an allergy to wheat that typically presents as a food allergy, but can also be a contact allergy resulting from occupational exposure. The exact mechanism of this allergy is not yet clear. Wheat allergy may be immunoglobulin E-mediated or not, and may involve a mast cell response. Wheat allergy is rare—its prevalence in adults was estimated to be 0.21% in a 2012 study in Japan.

Wheat allergy may be a misnomer. There are many allergenic components in wheat (for example: serine protease inhibitors, glutelins and prolamins), with different responses attributed to different components. Twenty-seven potential wheat allergens have been identified.

The allergy, or allergies, are often caused by reactions to the storage proteins present in a wheat seed. While many reactions are caused by wheat proteins, allergenic components are also present in other biochemical forms. The most severe response is wheat-dependent exercise-induced anaphylaxis (WDEIA). WDEIA is attributed to an omega gliadin, which happens to be a relative of the protein that causes celiac disease. Symptoms include nausea, urticaria, and atopy.

Gluten sensitivity and Coeliac disease are two different diseases; however, the management is similar. Wheat allergy is a distinct gluten-related disorder with immunological mechanisms, diagnostic criteria, and management strategies that differ from those of celiac disease and non-celiac gluten sensitivity. Management of wheat allergy consists of complete withdrawal of any food containing wheat or other gluten-containing cereals.

== Types of allergies ==
Most wheat allergens are proteins, including seed storage proteins, as noted above. There are four major classes of seed storage proteins: albumins, globulins, prolamins and glutenins.

=== Gluten allergy ===
The relevant prolamins in wheat are gliadins. Gliadins and glutenins form the classic glutens—the causative agents of celiac disease (CD). Distinct immune cells and antibody types differentiate gluten allergy from CD (see Comparative pathophysiology of gluten sensitivities).

==== Prolamin allergies ====
Prolamins (gliadins) are associated with the more severe form of gluten allergy. Glutenin-induced allergies are often less severe. A proteomics-based study found a γ-gliadin isoform gene.

==== Glutelin allergies ====
Glutenin (wheat glutelin) is a predominant allergen in wheat. Nine subunits of LMW-glutenin have been found to be in connection with wheat allergies.

=== Albumin and globulin allergy ===
At present, many of the allergens of wheat have not been characterized; however, the early studies found many to be in the albumin class. A recent study in Europe confirmed the increased presence of allergies to amylase/trypsin inhibitors (serpins) and lipid transfer protein (LPT), but less reactivity to the globulin fraction. The allergies tend to differ between populations (Italian, Japanese, Danish or Swiss), indicating a potential genetic component to these reactivities.

=== Other allergies ===
==== Wheat pollen and grass allergies ====
Respiratory allergies are an occupational disease that develops in food service workers. Previous studies detected 40 allergens from wheat; some cross-reacted with rye proteins and a few cross-reacted with grass pollens. A later study showed that baker's allergy extends over a broad range of cereal grasses (wheat, durum wheat, triticale, cereal rye, barley, rye grass, oats, canary grass, rice, maize, sorghum and Johnson grass), though the greatest similarities were seen between wheat and rye, and that these allergies show cross-reactivity between seed proteins and pollen proteins, including a prominent cross-reactivity between the common environment rye pollen and wheat gluten.

==== Derivative allergies ====
Proteins are made of a chain of dehydrated amino acids. When enzymes cut proteins into pieces, they add water back to the site at which they cut. This process is called enzymatic hydrolysis, or in the case of proteins it is called proteolysis. The initial products of this hydrolysis are polypeptides, and smaller products are called simply peptides; these are called wheat protein hydrolysates. These hydrolysates can create allergens out of wheat proteins that previously did not exist by the exposure of buried antigenic sites in the proteins.

When proteins are cut into polypeptides, buried regions are exposed to the surface, and these buried regions may possibly be antigenic. Such hydrolyzed wheat protein is used as an additive in foods and cosmetics. The peptides are often 1 kD in size (9 amino acid residues in length) and may increase the allergic response. These wheat polypeptides can cause immediate contact urticaria in susceptible people.

== Signs and symptoms ==
Wheat allergies are not altogether different from other food allergies or respiratory allergies. However, two conditions, exercise/aspirin induced anaphylaxis and urticaria, occur more frequently with wheat allergies.

Common symptoms of a wheat allergy include eczema (atopic dermatitis), hives (urticaria), asthma, "hay fever" (allergic rhinitis), angioedema (tissue swelling due to fluid leakage from blood vessels), abdominal cramps, nausea, and vomiting. Rarer symptoms include anaphylactic shock, anxiety, arthritis, bloated stomach, chest pains, depression or mood swings, diarrhea, dizziness, headache, joint and muscle aches and pains (may be associated with progressive arthritis), palpitations, psoriasis, irritable bowel syndrome (IBS), swollen throat or tongue, tiredness and lethargy, and unexplained cough.

In pediatric patients, symptoms related to the digestive system predominate, particularly nausea, vomiting, and diarrhea; and less often - abdominal pain. Skin manifestations such as itching, erythema, urticaria, angioedema, or exacerbation of atopic dermatitis are also common. With age, gastrointestinal symptoms usually disappear and the most common manifestation of WA in older children are skin symptoms. These symptoms may be accompanied by respiratory symptoms such as rhinitis, hoarseness, and chronic cough. These manifestations are much less common in adolescents and adults.

Reactions may become more severe with repeated exposure.

=== Asthma, anaphylaxis, nasal allergies ===
==== Exercise-induced anaphylaxis ====
Wheat gliadins and potentially oat avenins are associated with another disease, known as wheat-dependent exercise induced anaphylaxis (WDEIA) which is similar to baker's allergy as both are mediated by IgE responses. In WDEIA, however, the ω-gliadins or a high molecular weight glutenin subunit, and similar proteins in other Triticeae genera, enter the blood stream during exercise where they cause acute asthmatic or allergic reaction. Wheat may specifically induce WDEIA and certain chronic urticaria because the anti-gliadin IgE detects ω_{5}-gliadins expressed by most of the Gli-B1 alleles, but prolamins extracted from rye or wheat/rye translocates invoke almost no responses. The Gli-B1 gene in wheat, Triticum aestivum, comes from the progenitor species Aegilops speltoides. This indicates that nascent mutations on the B genome of wheat are from a small number of cultivated Triticeae species.

==== Baker's allergy ====
Baker's allergy has a ω-gliadin component and thioredoxin hB component. In addition, a gluten-extrinsic allergen has been identified as aspergillus amylase, added to flour to increase its baking properties.

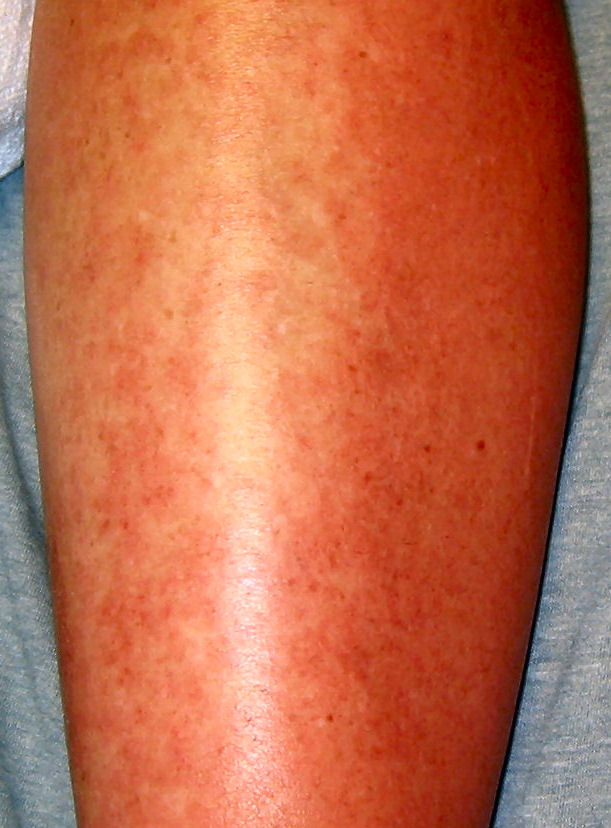
Allergic urticaria on the shin

=== Urticaria, atopy, eczema ===
Contact sensitivity, atopic dermatitis, eczema, and urticaria appear to be related phenomena, the cause of which is generally believed to be the hydrophobic prolamin components of certain Triticeae, Aveneae cultivars. In wheat one of these proteins is ω-gliadin (Gli-B1 gene product). A study of mothers and infants on an allergen-free diet demonstrated that these conditions can be avoided if wheat sensitive cohort in the population avoid wheat in the first year of life. As with exercise induced anaphylaxis, aspirin (also: tartrazine, sodium benzoate, sodium glutamate (MSG), sodium metabisulfite, tyramine) may be sensitizing factors for reactivity. Studies of the wheat-dependent exercise induced anaphylaxis demonstrate that atopy and EIA can be triggered from the ingestion wheat proteins into the blood, where IgE reacts within allergens in the dermal tissues. Some individuals may be so sensitive that low dose aspirin therapy can increase risk for both atopy and WDEIA.

Wheat allergies were also common with contact dermatitis. A primary cause was the donning agent used for latex gloves prior to the 1990s; however, most gloves now use protein-free starch as a donning agent.

=== Rheumatoid arthritis ===
There appears to be an association of rheumatoid arthritis (RA) both with gluten sensitive enteropathy (GSE) and gluten allergies. RA in GSE/CD may be secondary to tissue transglutaminase (tTG) autoimmunity. In a recent study in Turkey, 8 of 20 RA patients had wheat reactivities on the radioallergosorbent test (RAST). When this allergic food and all other patient specific RAST+ foods were removed half of the patients had improved RA by serological markers. In patients with wheat allergies, rye was effectively substituted. This may indicate that some proportion of RA in GSE/CD is due to downstream effects of allergic responses. In addition, cross-reactive anti-beef-collagen antibodies (IgG) may explain some rheumatoid arthritis (RA) incidents.

=== Neuropathies ===
Migraines. In the late 1970s it was reported that people with migraines had reactions to food allergens. Similarly to people with RA, the most common reaction among people with migraines was to wheat (78%), orange, eggs, tea, coffee, chocolate, milk, beef, corn, cane sugar, and yeast. When 10 foods causing the most reactions were removed, migraines fell precipitously and hypertension declined. Some specific instances are attributed to wheat.

Autism. Parents of children with autism often ascribe the children's gastrointestinal symptoms to allergies to wheat and other foods. The published data on this approach are sparse, with the only double-blind study reporting negative results.

== Diagnosis ==
Diagnoses of wheat allergy may deserve special consideration. Omega-5 gliadin, the most potent wheat allergen, cannot be detected in whole wheat preparations; it must be extracted and partially digested (similar to how it degrades in the intestine) to reach full activity. Other studies show that digestion of wheat proteins to about 10 amino acids can increase the allergic response 10-fold. Furthermore, studies have shown that in populations with high exposure to grass pollen, positive test results for wheat extract may occur in 60–65% of patients with grass allergy who actually tolerate wheat consumption. The determination of specific IgE for ω-5-gliadin has become a key element in the diagnosis of WDEIA and severe WA in children, showing significantly higher specificity (reaching 95 -100% in some studies) compared to the extract.

Certain allergy tests may not be suitable to detect all wheat allergies, resulting in cryptic allergies. Because many of the symptoms associated with wheat allergies, such as eczema and asthma, may be related or unrelated to a wheat allergy, medical deduction can be an effective way of determining the cause. If symptoms are alleviated by immunosuppressant drugs, such as prednisone, an allergy-related cause is likely. If multiple symptoms associated with wheat allergies are present in the absence of immunosuppressants then a wheat allergy is probable.

Wheat allergy must be distinguished from coeliac disease, although both conditions may co-occur.

== Prevention ==
Management of wheat allergy consists of complete withdrawal of any food containing wheat and other gluten-containing cereals (gluten-free diet). However, some patients can tolerate barley, rye or oats.

In people with less severe forms of wheat-dependent exercise induced anaphylaxis (WDEIA), avoiding wheat consumption before exercise and other cofactors that trigger disease symptoms, such as nonsteroidal anti-inflammatory drugs and alcohol, can be sufficient to avoid an allergy.

Wheat is often a cryptic contaminant of many foods; more obvious items are bread crumbs, maltodextrin, bran, cereal extract, couscous, cracker meal, enriched flour, gluten, high-gluten flour, high-protein flour, seitan, semolina wheat, vital gluten, wheat bran, wheat germ, wheat gluten, wheat malt, wheat starch or whole wheat flour. Less obvious sources of wheat could be gelatinized starch, hydrolyzed vegetable protein, modified food starch, modified starch, natural flavoring, soy sauce, soybean paste, hoisin sauce, starch, vegetable gum, specifically beta-glucan, or vegetable starch.

=== Alternative cereals ===
Triticeae gluten-free oats (free of wheat, rye or barley) may be a useful source of cereal fiber. Some wheat allergies allow the use of rye bread as a substitute. Rice flour is a commonly used alternative for those allergic to wheat. Wheat-free millet flour, buckwheat, flax seed meal, corn meal, quinoa flour, chia seed flour, tapioca starch or flour, and others can be used as substitutes.

== Treatment ==
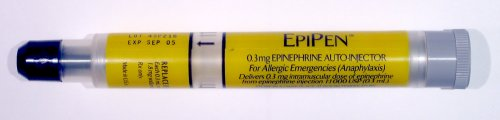
Epinephrine autoinjectors are portable single-dose epinephrine-dispensing devices used to treat anaphylaxis.

Treatment for accidental ingestion of wheat products by allergic individuals varies depending on the sensitivity of the person. An antihistamine such as diphenhydramine may be prescribed. Sometimes prednisone will be prescribed to prevent a possible late phase Type I hypersensitivity reaction. Severe allergic reactions (anaphylaxis) may require treatment with an epinephrine pen, which is an injection device designed to be used by a non-healthcare professional when emergency treatment is warranted.

== See also ==
- Allergy (has diagrams showing involvement of different types of white blood cells)
- Food allergy (has images of hives, skin prick test and patch test)
- Gluten immunochemistry
- List of allergens (food and non-food)
