= Gluten immunochemistry =

The immunochemistry of Triticeae glutens is important in several inflammatory diseases. It can be subdivided into innate responses (direct stimulation of immune system), class II mediated presentation (HLA DQ), class I mediated stimulation of killer cells, and antibody recognition. The responses to gluten proteins and polypeptide regions differs according to the type of gluten sensitivity. The response is also dependent on the genetic makeup of the human leukocyte antigen genes. In gluten sensitive enteropathy, there are four types of recognition, innate immunity (a form of cellular immunity priming), HLA-DQ, and antibody recognition of gliadin and transglutaminase. With idiopathic gluten sensitivity only antibody recognition to gliadin has been resolved. In wheat allergy, the response pathways are mediated through IgE against other wheat proteins and other forms of gliadin.

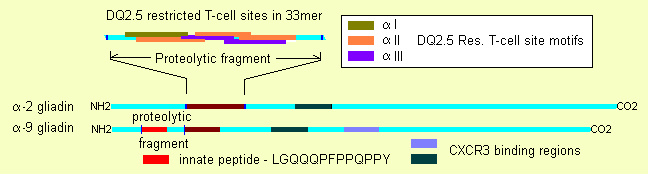
Illustration of two alpha gliadins showing two proteolytically resistant sites. Top shows 6 T-cells sites in 33mer, and bottom shows innate immune peptide and two CXCR3 binding sites.

== Innate immunity ==
Underlying conditions
The normal intestine

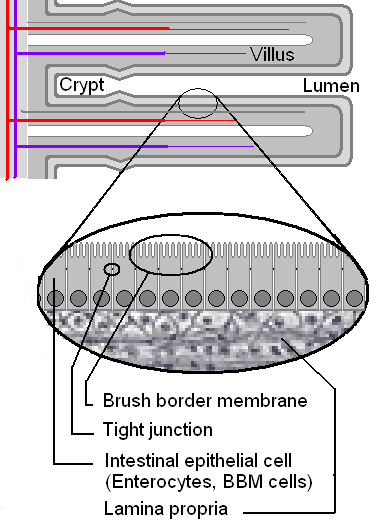
Illustration of the brush border membrane of small intestinal villi

Wheat proteins interact with the immune system by means of DQ2-mediated programmed cell death (apoptosis) of the gut in sensitive individuals. New research is finding that the coeliac gut may be predisposed to sensitivity in the absence of HLA genetic factors.

How diet proteins reach the blood

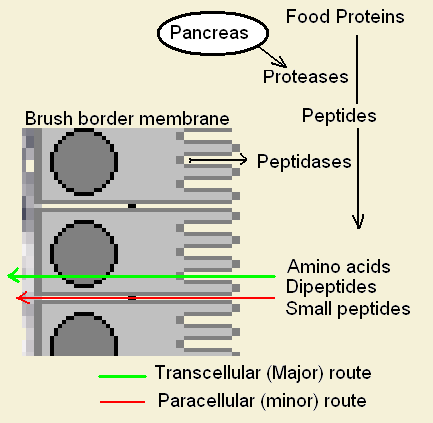
The fate of digestible protein in the small intestine

In the normal gut, proteins are digested to peptides by pepsin (stomach), trypsin and chymotrypsin (derived from the pancreas and activated in the gut). Peptides are further digested when they approach the villi, where brush border peptidases break proteins into amino acids. Over much of the small intestine only small solutes, like water, can cross the tight junctions, however, in some regions of the intestine peptides as large as 500 daltons (4 amino-acids residues in length) can cross.

The gluten sensitive gut

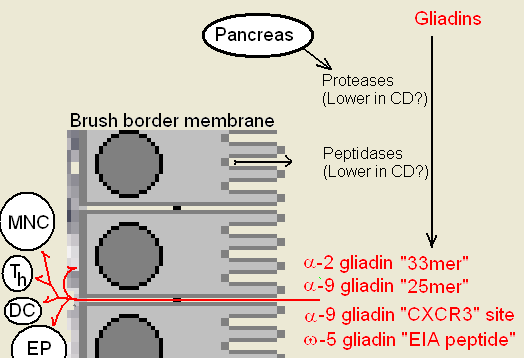
The fate of gluten in coeliac disease or EIA

There is a growing body of evidence that the gluten-sensitive intestine differs from the normal gut, several gluten peptides can enter behind the brush border membrane cells. For example, a "33mer" of α-2 gliadin is a magnitude larger than the size exclusion of the tight junction, ω-5 gliadin peptides have been found in the blood stream of people with exercise-induced anaphylaxis, aided by salicylates. And the innate 25 is capable of reaching mononuclear cells in coeliac gut, but in normal gut is broken down by brush border peptidases. It may be this lower peptidase activity that explains the presence of these peptides behind the brush border membrane. Recently, it was found that an α-9 gliadin peptide was capable of binding the "CXCR3" receptor, increasing zonulin production and weakening tight junctions, this may explain how, generally, larger peptides can enter the gluten-sensitive gut.

Innate immunity to gluten refers to an immune response that works independently of T-cell receptor or antibody recognition of the 'innate' peptide. This peptide acts directly on cells, such as monocytes, stimulating their growth and differentiation. Innate immunity to gluten is complicated by an apparent role gluten has in bypassing normal host defense and peptide exclusion mechanisms in the gut. While not truly innate, these activities allow gliadin to enter into areas where many lymphocytes patron. In bypassing these filters gliadin alters the normal behavior of both digestive cells, called enterocytes or epithelial cells, and lymphocytes. This increases the potential of causing sensitivity (see Underlying conditions). One potential explanation of why certain people become sensitive is that these individuals may not produce adequate peptidases in some areas of the gut, allowing these peptides to survive. Other explanation for some may be that food chemicals or drugs are weakening the defenses. This can be the case with ω5-gliadin allergy with salicylate sensitivity. There is no clear reasoning, either from genetics or from long-term studies of susceptible individuals why these gut peptide restrictions would change.

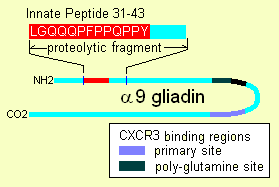
Illustration of the innate peptide and CXCR3 sites on alpha-9 gliadin

Once inside, α-9 gliadin 31–55 shows the ability to activate undifferentiated immune cells that then proliferate and also produce inflammatory cytokines, notably interleukin 15 (IL-15). This produces a number of downstream responses that are pro-inflammatory. The other peptide that may have innate behavior is the "CXCR3" receptor binding peptides, the receptor exists on enterocytes, the brush border membrane cells. The peptide displaces an immune factor and signals the disruption of the membrane seal, the tight junctions, between cells.

=== Alpha gliadin 31–43 ===
Gluten bears an innate response peptide (IRP) found on α-9 gliadin, at positions 31–43 and on α-3, 4, 5, 8, and 11 gliadins. The IRP lies within a 25 amino-acid long region that is resistant to pancreatic proteases. The 25mer is also resistant to brush border membrane peptidases of the small intestine in coeliacs. IRP induced the rapid expression of interleukin 15 (IL15) and other factors. Thus IRP activates the immune system. Studies show that, while in normal individuals the peptide is trimmed over time to produce inactive peptide, in coeliacs a 19mer may lose a residue from one end or the other, after prolonged incubation that 50% remains intact.

==== Intraepithileal lymphocytes and IL15 ====
The release of IL15 is a major factor in coeliac disease as IL15 has been found to attract intraepithelial lymphocytes (IEL) that characterize Marsh grade 1 and 2 coeliac disease. Lymphocytes attracted by IL-15 are composed of markers enriched on natural killer cells versus normal helper T-cells. One hypothesis is that IL-15 induces the highly inflammatory Th1 response that activates T-helper cells (DQ2 restricted gliadin specific) that then orchestrate the destructive response, but the reason why inflammatory cells develop prior to gliadin specific helper cells is not known. The IRP response differs from typical responses that stimulate IL15 release, such as viral infection. In addition, other cytokines such as IL12 and IL2, which are typically associated with T-helper cell stimulation, are not involved. In these two ways the innate peptide activation of T-cells in coeliac disease is strange. IL-15 appears to induce increases in MICA and NKG2D that may increase brush-border cell killing.

In addition, innate immunity to IRP peptide is involved in coeliac disease, dermatitis herpetiformis and possibly juvenile diabetes. IRP targets monocytes and increases the production of IL-15 by an HLA-DQ independent pathway, a subsequent study showed that both this region and the "33mer" could create the same response, in cells from both treated coeliacs and non-coeliacs. However, unlike the non-coeliacs, the treated coeliac cells produce the disease marker nitrite. This indicates that another abnormality in people with coeliac disease that allows stimulation to proceed past the normal healthy state. After extensive study, there is no known genetic association for this that appears to stand out at present, and implicates other environmental factors in the defect.

=== Infiltrating peptides ===
Some alpha gliadin have other direct-acting properties. Other gliadin peptides, one in a glutamine rich region and another peptide, "QVLQQSTYQLLQELCCQHLW", bind a chemoattractant receptor, CXCR3. Gliadin binds to, blocks and displaces a factor, I-TAC, that binds this receptor. In the process it recruits more CXCR3 receptor, increases MyD88 and zonulin expression. The factor it displaces, I-TAC, is a T-cell attractant. This peptide may also be involved in increased risk for type 1 diabetes as zonulin production is also a factor. This triggering of zonulin ultimately results in the degradation of tight junctions allowing large solutes, such as proteolytic resistant gliadin fragments to enter behind the brush border membrane cells.

One study examined the effect of ω-5 gliadin, the primary cause of WD-EIA, and found increased permeability of intestinal cells. Other studies show that IgE reactivity to ω-5 gliadin increases greatly when deamidated or crosslinked to transglutaminase.

== HLA class I restrictions to gliadin ==
HLA class I restrictions to gliadin are not well characterized. HLA-A2 presentation has been investigated. The HLA-A antigens can mediate apoptosis in autoimmune disease and HLA A*0201 in with the HLA-DQ8 haplotypes has been documented. The class I sites were found on the carboxyl end of gliadin at positions 123–131, 144–152, and 172–180. The involvement of class I responses may be minor, since antibodies to transglutaminase correlate with pathogenesis and recognition of extracellular matrix and cell surface transglutaminase can explain the destruction within coeliac disease. This process involves antibody-dependent cellular cytotoxicity. With regard to a receptor called FOS, euphemistically called the "Death Receptor", enterocytes appear to overexpress the receptor in coeliac lesions, there is speculation that Class I presentation of gliadin, tTG or other peptides that invokes signalling. The role of class I receptor in cell-mediated programmed cell (enterocyte) death is not known.

=== MIC ===
These proteins are called MHC class I polypeptide-related sequence A and B. Discovered by sequence homology analysis these proteins are found on the surface of enterocytes of the small intestine, are believed to play a role in disease. Studies to date have revealed no mutation that would increase risk for MICA.

== HLA-DQ recognition of gluten ==
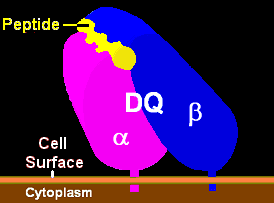
Illustration of HLA-DQ with peptide in the binding pocket

HLA DQ Receptor with bound peptide and TCR

Understanding DQ Haplotypes and DQ isoforms
DQ haplotypes

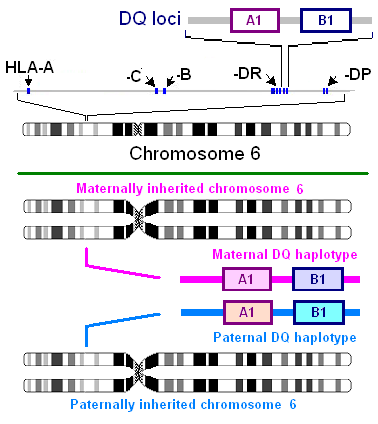
Illustration of DQ antigen genetics, click image for details

Each individual has 22 pairs of autosomes. The HLA complex in humans is a large region, ~3 million nucleotides, on chromosome 6, within this region there are a large number of genes. The DQ represent 2 genetic loci that lie next to each other. One gene is called DQA1 and the other is called DQB1. There are many alleles at each genetic locus.
Further information: HLA-DQ, HLA-DQA1, and HLA-DQB1

DQ antigen, a cell surface receptor, is composed of two polypeptide subunits. There are dozens of alleles at each locus and many create unique subunit isoforms. There are a large number of possible combinations. Evolution of humans has limited the most common isoforms. These are more common isoforms encoded by haplotypes, almost all of the time, one passed without change from a person's mother and father from conception. Each allele at each locus has an official name. For the alpha subunit the names are given by the gene-alleles. For example, the major DQ1 alleles are given as DQA1*0101, *0102, *0103, *0104. DQ1 refers to the DQ α1 groups of isoforms (historically by serotype) which is the 01 portion of the allele number, the last two digits identify a specific allele in that group. All other DQ serotypes refer to beta chain groups – DQ2, DQ3-(DQ7, DQ8, DQ9), DQ4, DQ5, DQ6. A common way to write a phenotype (both alleles a person has) as DQA1*0101/*0102. This is not enough information to identify a person's isoforms. We also need information about beta chain, the best way to do this is to refer to common haplotypes. HLA-DQ haplotypes are commonly written in a style: HLA-DQA1*0101:DQB1*0501. When considering a person's haplo-phenotype the form DQA1*0102:DQB1*0602/DQA1*0501:DQB1*0201 is the same as DQA1*0102/*0501 DQB1*0602/*0201. When drawn out the form can be used to identify all potential isoforms. (See image below)

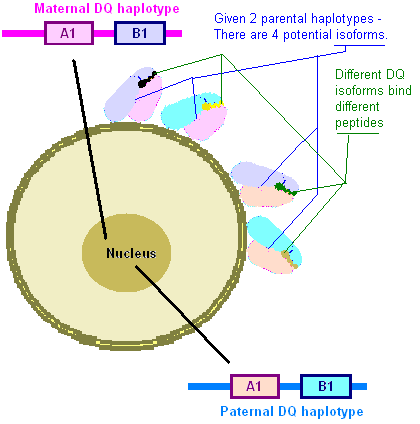
Relationship of haplotypes to antigens

There are many potential DQ isoforms as a result of cis- and trans-haplotype pairing (see image on left). Of course the cis-haplotypes are more common. Typically most individuals can produce 4 isoforms, but the 2 isoforms tend to be the most abundant. There are instances where this may not be true, such as when the two betas or two alphas are very similar in structure. Most important with regard to isoforms – different subunit isoform pairings can result in the binding of different foreign or self antigens. From a disease defense perspective the more different kinds of peptides that can be presented, the more likely the immune system will detect pathogens and remove them quickly. As a consequence the HLA genes are kept extremely variable in most mammalian populations relative to other genes.
DQ2.5 and gluten sensitivity

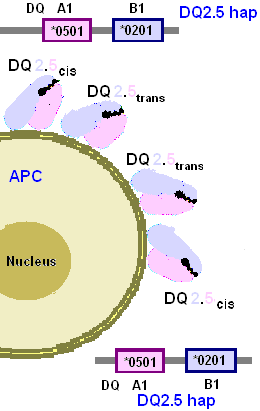
Isoform pairings in DQ2.5 homozygotes result in one isoform

For coeliac disease however there appears to be one isoform that has a higher role. This isoform is DQ α5-β2 (DQ2.5). Because the beta chain is β2, historically it has been called DQ2. Not all DQ2 isoforms are pathogenic, but at least 2 appear to be more associated with disease. DQ2.5 isoform is not rare, 25% of Americans Caucasians carry the isoform, whereas >90% of people with coeliac disease carry the isoform. DQ2 is also increased in gluten-sensitive idiopathic neuropathy. The DQA1*0501:DQB1*0201 haplotype is the most frequent source of DQ2.5 isoform called DQ2.5_{cis}. It is found in almost all coeliacs and the haplotype is frequently called, also, DQ2.5 haplotype.

25% of coeliacs are DQ2 homozygotes (HLA DQB1*02 homozygotes), only a small percent of these do not bear DQ2.5_{cis}. This minority are invariably DQA1*0201:DQB1*0202 (DQ2.2_{cis} homozygotes).

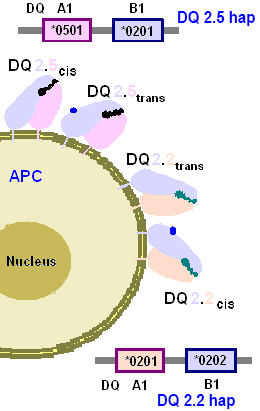
Isoform pairings in DQ2.5/DQ2.2 results in two functionally unique isoform

The majority of DQ2 homozygotes are homozygotes of the DQ2.5 haplotype or DQ2.5 and DQ2.2 haplotypes. These DQ2 homozygotes tend to show increased mucosa damage and degradation and are at greatest risk for severe complications of coeliac disease, refractory disease, and enteritis associated T-cell lymphoma (EATL).
Further information: DQ2.5, DQ2.2, DQ2 and coeliac disease, and HLA DR3-DQ2
Risk for disease tends to be carried in families because of the DQ2.5_{cis} encoding haplotypes. Atypically about 3% of coeliacs get DQ2.5 isoform as a result of trans-chromosomal encoding. This can occur because one DQ haplotype, DQA1*0505:DQB1*0301 (DQ7.5) produces an alpha chain in which the variable portion relative to DQA1*0501 is chopped off during processing to DQ heterodymer.

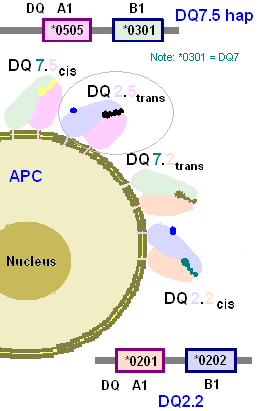
Isoform pairings in DQ7.5/DQ2.2 result in 4 proteins isoforms, DQ2.5trans isoform is one(circled)

Therefore, it can produce the α5 subunit. The DQ2.2 haplotypes provide the β2 subunit, and consequently DQ7.5/DQ2.2 phenotype creates the DQ2.5_{trans} isoform.

The DQ isoform has a complex genetic involvement in coeliac disease. And these involvements explain the majority of disease. One other haplotype exists that is associated with disease, although not as common in Europe, DQ8 is found to be involved in coeliac disease in peoples where DQ2 is not present. DQ8.1 haplotype encodes the DQA1*0301:DQB1*0302 haplotype and represents the overwhelming majority of all DQ8. DQ2.5 is generally highest in northern, islandic Europe, and the Basque of Northern Spain. Phenotype frequency exceeds 50% in certain parts of Ireland. DQ8 is extremely high in Native Americans of Central America and tribes of Eastern American origin, fortunately most of these peoples have retained a maize based diet.

HLA-DQ proteins present polypeptide regions of proteins of about 9 amino acids and larger in size (10 to 14 residues in involved in binding is common for gliadin) to T lymphocytes. Gliadin proteins can be adsorbed by APC. After digestion in the lysosomes of APCs, gliadin peptides can be recycled to the cell's surface bound to DQ, or they can be bound and presented directly from the cell surface. The major source of inflammatory gluten is dietary gluten. Optimal reactivity of gliadin occurs when the protein is partially digested by small intestinal lysozyme and trypsin into proteolytic digests. These polypeptides of gluten can then make their way behind the epithelial layer of cells (membrane), where APCs and T-cells reside in the lamina propria. (See: Underlying conditions.)

The APC bearing DQ-gliadin peptide on the surface can bind to T-cells that have an antibody-like T-cell receptor the specifically recognized DQ2.5 with gliadin. The complex (APC-DQ-gliadin) thus stimulates the gliadin specific T-cells to divide. These cells cause B-cells that recognize gliadin to proliferate. The B-cells mature into plasma cells producing anti-gliadin antibodies. This does not cause coeliac disease and is an unknown factor in idiopathic disease. Enteropathy is believed to occur when tissue transglutaminase (tTG) covelantly links itself to gliadin peptides that enter the lamina propria of the intestinal villus. The resulting structure can be presented by APC (with the same gliadin recognizing DQ isoforms) to T-cells, and B-cells can produce anti-transglutaminase antibodies. This appears to result in the destruction of the villi. The release of gliadin by transglutaminase does not lessen disease. When tTG-gliadin undergoes hydrolysis, the result is deamidated gliadin. Deamidated gliadin peptides are more inflammatory relative to natural peptides. Deamidated gliadin is also found in foods that have added gluten, such as wheat bread, food pastes.

The major gluten proteins that are involved in coeliac disease are the α-gliadin isoforms. Alpha gliadin is composed of repeated motifs that, when digested, can be presented by HLA-DQ molecules. DQ2.5 recognizes several motifs in gluten proteins, and therefore HLA-DQ can recognize many motifs on each gliadin (see Understanding DQ haplotypes and DQ isoforms on the right) However, numbers of different proteins from the grass tribe Triticeae have been found to carry motifs presented by HLA DQ2.5 and DQ8. Wheat has a large number of these proteins because its genome contains chromosomes derived from two goat grass species and a primitive wheat species. The positions of these motifs in different species, strains and isoforms may vary because of insertions and deletions in sequence. There are a large number of wheat variants, and a large number of gliadins in each variant, and thus many potential sites. These proteins once identified and sequenced can be surveyed by sequence homology searches.

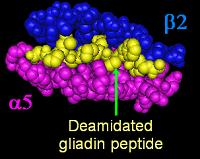
DQ α^{5}-β^{2} -binding cleft with a deamidated gliadin peptide (yellow), modified from PDB: 1S9V

=== HLA-DQ2.5 ===
HLA-DQ recognition of gliadin is critical to the pathogenesis of gluten-sensitive enteropathy, it also appears to be involved in idiopathic gluten sensitivity (See Understanding DQ haplotypes and DQ isoforms on the right). HLA-DQ2 primarily presents gliadins with the HLA-DQ isoform DQ2.5 (DQ α5-β2) isoform. DQA1*0202:DQB1*0201 homozygotes (DQ α2-β2) also appear to be able to present pathogenic gliadin peptides, but a smaller set with lower binding affinity.

==== DQ2.5 and α-gliadin ====
Many of these gliadin motifs are substrates for tissue transglutaminase and therefore can be modified by deamidation in the gut to create more inflammatory peptides. The most important recognition appears to be directed toward the α-/β-gliadins. An example of the repetition of a motif across many proteins, the α-2 gliadin (57–68) and (62–75) are also found on α-4, α-9 gliadin. Many gliadins contain the "α-20 motif", which is found in wheat and other Triticeae genera.(see also: "α-20" gliadin motifs). Alpha-2 secalin, the glutinous protein in rye, is composed of two amino-terminal overlapping T-cell sites at positions (8–19) and (13–23).

==== A2-gliadin ====
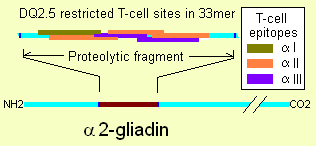
Illustration of deamidated α2-gliadin's 33mer, amino acids 56–88 in sequence, showing the overlapping of three varieties of T-cell epitope

Although T-cell responses to many prolamins can be found in coeliac disease, one particular gliadin, α2-gliadin appears to be the focus of T-cells. These responses were dependent on prior treatment with tissue transglutaminase. Α2-gliadin differs from the other α-gliadins, specifically because it contains an insert of 14 amino acids. This particular insertion creates six T-cell sites where, in the most similar gliadins, there are two or fewer sites. The sites belong to three epitope groups "α-I", "α-II", and "α-III" The insertion also creates a larger region of α-gliadin that is resistant to gastrointestinal proteases. The smallest digest of trypsin and chymotrypsin for the region is a 33mer. This particular region has three tissue transglutaminase sites, two sites that lie within the 14 amino acid insertion, a region of maximal stimulation are found with more than 80% reduction in response for native, un-deaminated, sequence at the position. Because of the density of T-cell sites on the "33mer" the affinity for deamidated gliadin is strongly indicates that it may be best treated as a single T-cell site of much higher affinity. This site alone may fulfill all the T-helper cell adaptive immune requirements with HLA-DQ2.5 involvement in some coeliac disease.

==== DQ2.5 and γ-gliadin ====
While gamma gliadin is not as important to DQ2.5 mediated disease as α-2 gliadin there are a number of identified motifs. The gamma epitopes identified are DQ2-"γ-I", -"γ-II" (γ30), -"γ-III", -"γ-IV", -"γ-VI" and -"γ-VII" Some of these epitopes are recognized in children who do not have T-cell reactivities toward α-2 gliadin. A 26 residue proteolytic resistance fragment has been found on γ-5 gliadin, positions 26–51, that has multiple transglutaminase and T-cell epitopes. This site has five overlapping T-cells sites of DQ2-"γ-II", -"γ-III", -"γ-IV", and "γ-glia 2". Computer analysis of 156 prolamins and glutelins revealed many more resistant fragments; one, a γ-gliadin, containing 4 epitopes was 68 amino acids in length.

==== DQ2 and glutelins ====
Triticeae glutelins presented by DQ2 is some coeliacs. In wheat, the low molecular weight glutenins often share structural similarity with the prolamins of the similar species of Triticeae. Two motifs, K1-like (46–60), pGH3-like (41–59) and GF1 (33–51) have been identified. High molecular weight glutenin has also been identified as a potentially toxic protein Some of the HMW glutenins increase response with transglutaminase treatment, indicating the sites might be similar to alpha-gliadin and gamma gliadin T-cell sites.

=== DQ2.2 restricted gliadin sites ===
DQ2.2 can present a fewer number of lower affinity sites relative to DQ2.5. Some of these sites are found on γ-gliadin the gliadin most similar to prolamins of other Triticeae genera, a gliadin that appears to similar to ancestral. Antigen presenting cells bearing DQ2.2 can present alpha gliadin sites, for example alpha-II region of the "33mer" and therefore the "33mer" may have a role in DQ2.2 bearing individuals, but the binding capacity is substantially lower.

=== HLA-DQ8 ===
HLA-DQ8 confers susceptibility to coeliac disease but in a fashion somewhat similar to DQ2.5. Homozygotes of DQ8, DQ2.5/DQ8 and DQ8/DQ2.2 are higher than expected based on levels in the general population (see: Understanding DQ haplotypes and DQ isoforms). HLA-DQ8 is generally not as involved in the most severe complications, and it does not recognize the "33mer" of α-2 gliadin to the same degree as DQ2.5. There are a smaller number of gliadin (prolamin) peptides presented by HLA-DQ8. A few studies have been done on the adaptive immune response for DQ8/DQ2− individuals. DQ8 appears to rely much more on adaptive immunity to the carboxyl half of alpha gliadins. In addition, it appear to react with gamma gliadin to a degree comparable to DQ2.5. T-cell responses to the high molecular weight glutenin may be more important with DQ8 mediated than DQ2.5 mediated coeliac disease.

== Antibody recognition ==
Antibody recognition of gluten is complex. Direct binding to gluten such as anti-gliadin antibodies has an ambiguous pathogenesis in coeliac disease. The crosslinking of gliadin with tissue transglutaminase leads to the production of anti-transglutaminase antibodies, but this is mediated through T-cell recognition of gliadin. The allergic recognition of gliadin by mast cells, eosinophiles in the presence of IgE has notable direct consequences, such as exercise-induced anaphylaxis.

Anti-gliadin antibodies, like those detected in coeliac disease bind to the α-2 gliadin (57–73). This site is within the T-cell reactive "33mer" presented by DQ2.5. There has been some suggestion wheat plays a role in juvenile diabetes as antibodies to the non-glutinous seed storage glb-1 (a globulin) are implicated in crossreactive autoantigenic antibodies that destroy islet cells in the pancreas. Anti-gliadin antibodies have been found to synapsin I Omega-gliadin and the HMW Glutenin subunit antibodies have been found most commonly in individuals with exercise-induced anaphylaxis and Baker's allergy, and represent a potent class of gluten allergens. Non-glutinous proteins in wheat are also allergens, these include: LTP (albumin/globulin), thioredoxin-hB, and wheat flour peroxidase. A particular 5 residue peptide, Gln-Gln-Gln-Pro-Pro motif, has been found to be a major wheat allergen.

== Taming Triticeae immunochemistry ==
New immunogenic motifs appear in the literature almost monthly and new gliadin and Triticeae protein sequences appear that contain these motifs. The HLA DQ2.5 restricted peptide "IIQPQQPAQ" produced approximately 50 hits of identical sequences in NCBI-Blast search is one of several dozen known motifs whereas only a small fraction of Triticeae gluten variants have been examined. For this reason the immunochemistry is best discussed at the level of Triticeae, because it is clear that the special immunological properties of the proteins appear to have basal affinities to this taxa, appearing concentrated in wheat as a result of its three various genomes. Some current studies claim that removing the toxicity of gliadins from wheat as plausible, but, as the above illustrates, the problem is monumental. There are many gluten proteins, three genomes with many genes each for alpha, gamma, and omega gliadins. For each motif many genome-loci are present, and there are many motifs, some still not known.

Different strains of Triticeae exist for different industrial applications; durum for pasta and food pastes, two types of barley for beer, bread wheats used in different areas with different growing conditions. Replacing these motifs is not a plausible task since a contamination of 0.02% wheat in a gluten-free diet is considered to be pathogenic and would require replacing the motifs in all known regional varieties—potentially thousands of genetic modifications. Class I and antibody responses are downstream of Class II recognition and are of little remedial value in change. The innate response peptide could be a silver bullet, assuming there is only one of these per protein and only a few genome loci with the protein. Unresolved questions relevant to a complete understanding of immune responses to gluten are: Why is the rate of late onset gluten sensitivity rapidly rising? Is this truly a wheat problem, or something that is being done to wheat, or to those who are eating wheat (for example, communicable diseases a trigger? Some individuals are susceptible by genetics (early onset), but many late onset cases could have different triggers because there is nothing genetically separating the 30 to 40% of people that could have Triticeae sensitivity from the ~1% that, in their lifetime, will have some level of this disease.

Another way to make wheat less immunogenic is to insert proteolytic sites in the longer motifs (25-mer and 33-mer), facilitating more complete digestion.
