= Corn gluten meal =

Protein of corn

Corn gluten meal (CGM) is the principal protein of corn (maize) endosperm consisting mainly of zein and glutelin. It is a byproduct of corn processing that has historically been used as an animal feed. Despite the name, corn gluten does not contain true gluten, which is formed by the interaction of gliadin and glutenin proteins.

== Production ==
Corn gluten meal is one product of wet-milling corn as well as corn starch, germ oil meal, corn gluten feed, and steep liquor. Corn is steeped in water mixed with sulfur dioxide and ground to separate germ from the endosperm to extract oil. The endosperm goes through screenings to separate starch and proteins from the corn fiber or bran. The remaining starch and proteins are centrifuged to separate the starch from the corn gluten meal.

Dry corn gluten meal as commonly produced contains 71.4% crude protein, 4.1% fat, 0.8% fiber, 1.2% ash, 12.4% starch, and 10.1% other carbohydrates. The product is a golden yellow to brown powder with a cereal odor.

== Uses ==
=== Herbicide ===
The use of corn gluten meal as a preemergent herbicide was patented in 1991. Like many food-related substances used for gardening, is explicitly exempted from regulations in the US under 40 CFR 152.25(f). Corn gluten meal breaks down over time and can act as a fertilizer due to a high nitrogen content, but it should not be applied to areas where it is likely to wash directly into watersheds due to nitrogen runoff. The effectiveness of corn gluten meal as a preemergent is not conclusive. The added nitrogen can allow turfgrass to outcompete weeds, and the meal can act as mulch to prevent weed emergence, but will not affect emerged weeds.

=== Animal feed ===
Corn gluten meal is commonly used as livestock feed containing about 65% crude protein. It can be a source of protein, energy, and pigments for livestock, and is used in pet foods for digestibility. Corn gluten meal is occasionally confused for corn gluten feed, which instead has approximately 22% crude protein and is a mixture of bran, steep liquor, and maize germ oil from the milling process.

=== Food flavorings ===
Corn gluten is used in the manufacture of hydrolyzed vegetable protein, a common food flavoring.

=== Rodenticide ===
Corn gluten meal can be used as the active ingredient in rodenticides. The patent filing indicates that corn gluten meal can cause dehydration when swallowed by a rodent. Whereas another animal would vomit the bait out, a rodent cannot and would instead die slowly from dehydration. A commercial formulation made of pure corn gluten meal is available.

== Safety ==
CGM is neither flammable nor corrosive. It causes no poisoning when in contact with the skin, but causes irritation in 3.5% of subjects. There is no skin sensitization: rates of irritation do not increase.

CGM has not been tested for acute oral, inhalation, or eye irritation. It has not been tested for chronic toxicity, though its widespread and uneventful use as animal feed implies that it is unlikely to pose chronic or acute health risks. The EPA has accordingly waived its requirement for these data.
