= Hordein =

Hordein is a prolamin glycoprotein, present in barley and some other cereals, together with gliadin and other glycoproteins (such as glutelins) coming under the general name of gluten. Hordeins are found in the endosperm where one of their functions is to act as a storage unit. Hordeins are less soluble when compared to proteins such as albumins and globulins. Hordeins have a substantial amount of the amino acids proline and glutamine but lack charged amino acids such as lysine.

Some people are sensitive to hordein due to disorders such as celiac disease or gluten intolerance. Along with gliadin (the prolamin gluten found in wheat), hordein is present in many foods and also may be found in beer. Hordein is usually the main problem for celiac wishing to drink beer. Celiacs are able to find specialist breads that are low in hordein, gliadin, and other problematic glycoproteins, just as they can find gluten free beer which either uses ingredients that do not contain gluten, or otherwise has the amounts of gliadin or hordein present controlled to stated limits.
