= Triticeae glutens =

Seed storage protein in mature wheat seeds

Wheat gluten flour

Gluten is the seed storage protein in mature wheat seeds (and in the seeds of closely related species). It is the sticky substance in bread wheat which allows dough to rise and retain its shape during baking. The same, or very similar, proteins are also found in related grasses within the tribe Triticeae. Seed glutens of some non-Triticeae plants have similar properties, but none can perform on a par with those of the Triticeae taxa, particularly the Triticum species (bread wheat, durum wheat, etc.). What distinguishes bread wheat from these other grass seeds is the quantity of these proteins and the level of subcomponents, with bread wheat having the highest protein content and a complex mixture of proteins derived from three grass species (Aegilops speltoides, Aegilops tauschii strangulata, and Triticum monococcum).

Triticeae seed proteins fall into four groups:

- albumins – soluble in hypotonic solutions and are coagulated by heat
- globulins – soluble in 'isotonic' solutions
- prolamins – soluble in aqueous alcohol
- glutelins – soluble in dilute acids or bases, detergents, chaotropic or reducing agents.

Of these proteins the last two, prolamin (in wheat – gliadin) and glutelin (in wheat – glutenin) form the classically defined gluten components in wheat.

Triticeae glutens are primarily important to a developing definition 'gluten-free' in dietary treatments for gluten sensitivity which are intended to exclude pathogenic proteins from the diet of susceptible individuals (such as coeliac disease, irritable bowel syndrome, or inflammatory bowel diseases). The poisonous motifs appear to be spread widely in Triticeae, but not other taxa, for most coeliacs. However all four proteins are involved in wheat allergies, and proteins from non-wheats may not be involved in certain gluten allergies, or in idiopathic sensitivities.

== Prolamins and glutelins ==
Proteins of the Triticeae endosperm that are generally rich in arginine, proline, glutamine, and/or asparagine.

- Prolamins
  - Triticum (true wheats) – gliadins
  - Hordeum (food barleys) – hordeins (B-hordein is homologous to LMW-glutenin)
  - Secale (food ryes) – secalins
- glutelins
  - Triticum – glutenin
  - Hordeum – barley glutelin
  - Secale – rye glutelin

=== Genetics of prolamins and glutelins ===
Because of the usefulness of wheat glutens, genetic studies have largely focused on wheat genetics. Wheat has three genomes (AABBDD) and it can encode for many variations of the same protein, even in the gliadin subcategories many types of gliadin per cultivar, X = genome (A, B, or D genome chromosomes (1 to 7)). The A and B genomes are derived from wild emmers wheat which in turn is a natural digenomic species that contains a Triticum monococcum- and Aegilops speltoides-like genome. The D genome is derived from the extant species Aegilops tauschii strangulatum.

		Chromosome 1		Chromosome 6
		Short arm	Long arm	Short arm (≈30 coding loci over A, B, D indeterminate alleles)
Glutenins	HMW		Glu-X1: A >2 alleles, B >8 alleles, D >4 alleles	
Glutenins	LMW	Glu-X3: A >5 alleles, B >7 alleles, D >2 alleles		
Gliadins	α-gliadin			Gli-X2
Gliadins	β-gliadin	few - variants of γ-gliadin that migrate with β-gliadins?		most – (Gli-X2) variants of α-gliadin with alter isoelectric points
Gliadins	γ-gliadin	most - (Gli-X3) homologous proteins exist in barley		
Gliadins	ω-gliadin	Gli-X1: A is null @ 84%, B >8 alleles, D >4 alleles		few – (Gli-X2) variants of α-gliadin that migrate with γ-gliadins?

The genetic studies indicate that in wheat, each protein type can be encoded by several loci and several different alleles for each loci can be found in different genomes, allowing a great number of uniquely encoded isoforms.

=== Chemical behavior ===
- Gliadins, an example of the prolamins in Triticeae, are separated on the basis of electrophoretic mobility and isoelectric focusing
  - α-/β-gliadins – soluble in low percentage alcohols
  - γ-gliadins – ancestral form of cysteine rich gliadin with only intrachain disulfide
  - ω-gliadins – soluble in higher percentages of alcohol and acidic acetonitrile
- Cultivar glutelins in Triticeae
  - Glutenin is 35-40% of wheat (Triticum aestivum) protein.
  - Glutenin in wheat forms long covalently interlinked polymers of two repeating subunits
    - High molecular weight (HMW) – proline-less (Glu-1 locus)
    - Low molecular weight (LMW) – α-gliadin-like polypeptide (Glu-3 locus)
  - Barley (Hordeum) has two glutelins, soluble at high pH, precipitates at low pH
    - α-glutelin (major component, HMW) – cuts at 1 to 3% rel. saturation ammonium sulfate
    - β-glutelin (minor component) – cuts at 18% rel. saturation ammonium sulfate
  - Rye (Secalin) has one glutelin
    - HMW – (equivalent of Barley α-glutelin)
    - LMW – subspecies sylvestre has (Glu-R3) glutenin-like (Ssy1, Ssy2 and Ssy3 loci)

=== As substrates for enzymes ===
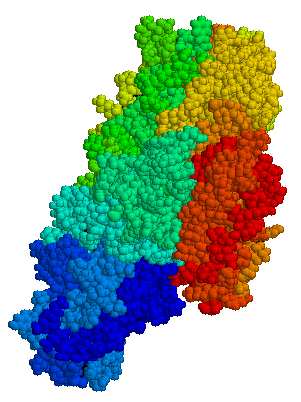
Tissue transglutaminase

==== Modification of glutamine ====
Prolamins and to a lesser degree glutelins are excellent substrates for deamidation particularly by mammalian tissue transglutaminases (tTG). Deamidation is a process in which the R-C0-NH2 portion of glutamines (or asparagine) is hydrolyzed to R-CO-OH forming glutamic acid or aspartic acid. In gliadin, the -QQP-, -QVP-, -QLP-, -QYP- tripeptides in the context of favorable adjacent peptides are readily deamidated. Most proteins have few or no such transglutaminase sites; however alpha gliadin has 13 such sites. Human tissue transglutaminase not only deamidates gliadin, but it also crosslinks itself to gliadin, which has immunological consequences. Gliadin also has a small peptide that appears to alter the distribution of transglutaminase in the gut but is not crosslinked, the mechanism of its 'innate' behavior is not clear. tTG also crosslinks gliadin to other proteins via these sites, generating anti-food responses, anti-self protein responses, and self-crossreactive responses to food proteins that result in secondary autoimmunities. The role of tTG in the extracellular matrix is to crosslink lysine side chains of proteins such as collagen to proteins, however glutens appear to infiltrate into the small intestine, interfering with this process and resulting in a false immune recognition of the matrix and surrounding cells as foreign, leading, ultimately, to the destruction of the intestinal mucosa. Seeds of certain plants may elicit the innate and cellular responses as a defensive response to overconsumption of seeds.

==== Proteolysis ====
While prolamins and glutelins are excellent deamidase and transaminase substrates the highly repetitive motifs, particularly polyproline/glutamine tracts, are often poor substrates for gastrointestinal endoproteases, such as those produced in the GI tract. One clear example is a 33-mer of α-2 gliadin. Another digestion resistant region is a 25-mer which contains the innate peptide. The alpha gliadins, which bear these sites, specifically are poisonous to young rats when fed at concentrations higher than 1% and the addition of mannosidase inhibitors increases the sensitivity specifically to alpha gliadins. These properties of certain alpha-gliadins appear to have evolved to prevent long-term or dedicated consumption of certain wheat grasses by certain species. This is one of the ironic properties of wheat, since a major advantage of wheat is the amount of protein in the wheat, however, some of this is wasted to the gut flora (or host immune system) since it cannot be broken down. One suggested remedy to this problem are new enzymes that help specifically break prolamins in the stomach. This may prevent the onset of wheat related disease in susceptible individuals, but no such screening is currently effective and once the clinical state is reached most individuals are so sensitive to wheat gliadins that, effectively, complete digestion in the stomach would be required.

== Immunochemistry of Triticeae glutens ==
The immunochemistry of Triticeae is important in several autoimmune diseases (see section on Human Disease), gluten sensitivity and gluten allergy in general. It can be subdivided into innate responses (direct stimulation of immune system), Class II mediated presentation (HLA DQ), Class I mediated stimulation of killer cells, and Antibody recognition. The DQ restricted class II mediated presentation of gliadin to T-helper lymphocytes appears to be the primary process involved in coeliac disease.

== History and food use of triticeae glutens ==
Glutens are an essential part of the modern food industry. The industry of wheat goes back to before the Neolithic period when people process grain berries (or corns) singly by hand. During the early phase of cultivation wheats were selected for their harvestability and growability under various climate conditions resulting in the first cultivars. This industry spread into many areas of western Eurasia during neolithization, carrying the more primitive cultivars. These grains were capable of being used for soups (speltoids) or tediously ground into simple flours and baked goods. During the second phase an Emmer wheat was produced that was an alloquadraploid species and this contained more gluten, making baking more efficient. This also spread during the neolithization but in places such cultivars were a minority. One variant of emmer wheat is called durum wheat and is the source of semolina flour, used in making pastas and other food pastes. Comparable varieties are found throughout Eurasia. Finally, emmers wheat was combined with a goat grass (Aegilops tauschii) to form allohexaploid bread wheat, which has a soft fine texture after rising and cooking. The industrial properties of this wheat are based in its glutens, glutens of high elasticity, high heat tolerance of other glutens or that change when subjected to heat to produce stronger polymers.

=== Comparing wheat gluten with corn (Zea) glutens ===
Corn is prepared by boiling in water with alkali then ground, resulting in a de-skinned material called nixtamalized masa. Masa can be used for tortillas, tamales, chips and other products, but it must be used quickly because its glutens change rapidly and binding decreases rapidly. Masa does not store well and chemicals are added to enhance preservation at the expense of quality. In contrast the glutens in wheat have more adhesive properties that change when prepared in different ways. The glutenins, for example, stretch, but can also fix their shape at high temperatures, causing bread to maintain its characteristic rise.

=== Important Triticeae composites ===
When the flour is combined with water and yeast the dough can be risen and subsequently fixed by heat resulting in a hard outer shell with a soft palatable interior. This makes bread amicable for both transport and preserves the bread for several days (in dry conditions). Barley can be sprouted for a short period and roasted, the resulting malt can be ground for food or combined with bread yeast (currently a brewers variety) to produce beer and distilled spirits such as whiskey, vodka and sourdough malts. Adding mild acid to rye flour activates it for bread making (Sourdough breads used in northern Europe).

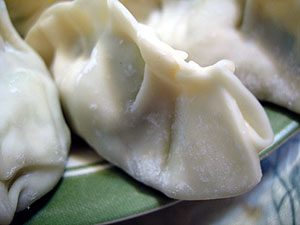
Asian dumpling

Adding egg to T. durum semolina flour can be used to make pastas, or without egg a pasta variant used to make Chinese dumplings. Wheat or semolina flour can be added other ingredients such as fish, meat or milk to create food pastes. Wheat can be further processed to a very fine flour and sifted, alternatively the glutens either can be extracted and readded to other products. While many seed glutens and food gums when combined with food starch, come close to creating the refined products of wheat flour and durum flour, no combination has yet come close to the qualities of these flours at a comparable price.

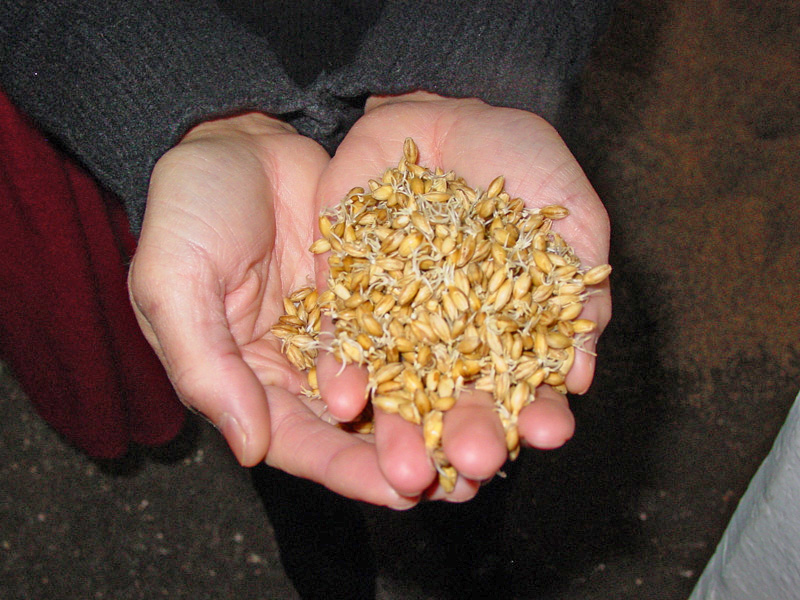
Malted barley

=== Malting ===
Some triticeae cultivars, like barley, have relatively low protein values. This makes them more acceptable for brewing beer, where high-protein grains can lead to a proteinaceous "haze" or turbidity. Seed storage proteins in grass seeds (i.e., gluten in wheat) are designed to help the plant grow during its early life, and among the seed proteins are enzymes that convert starch to sugar.

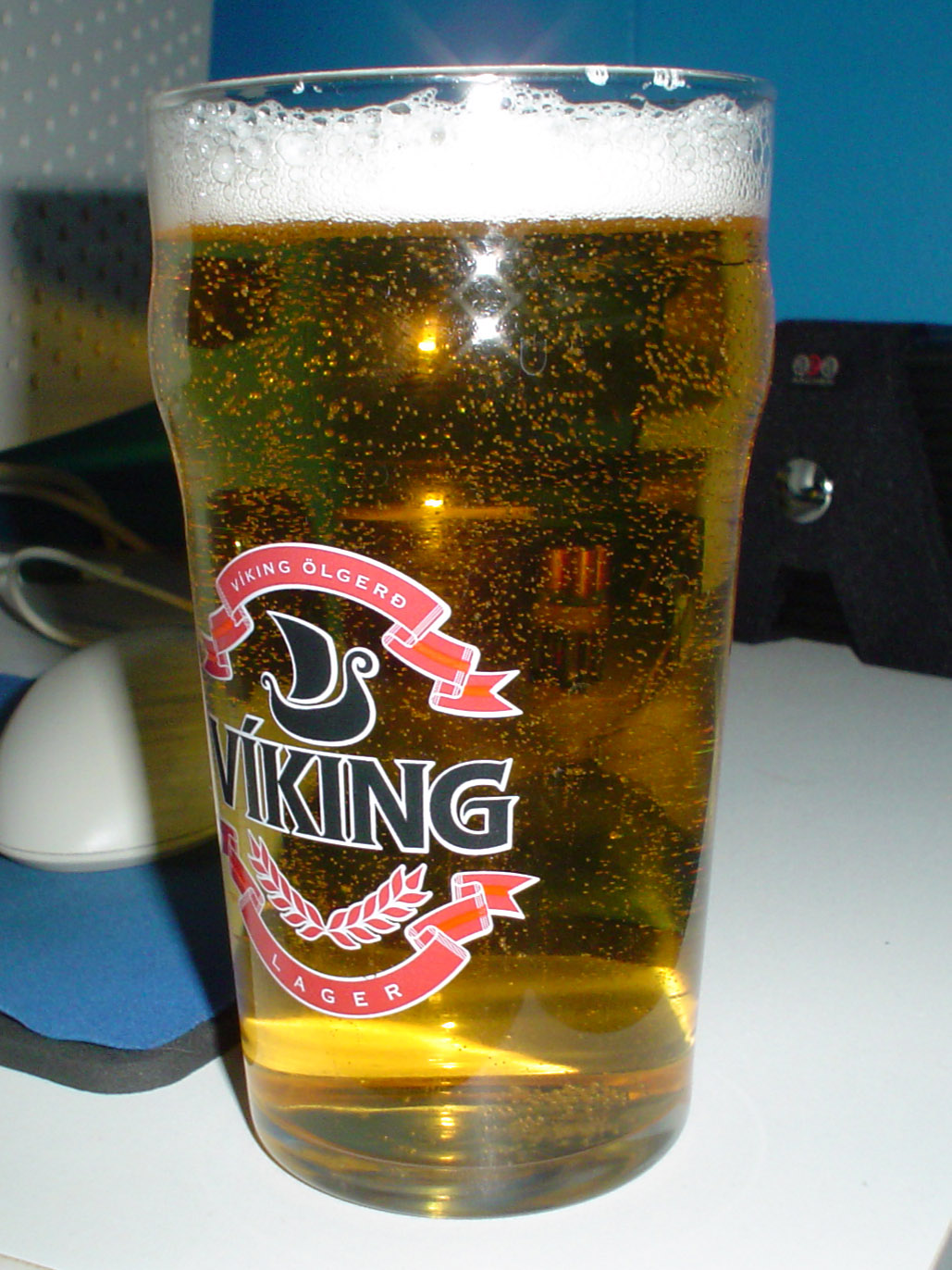
Beer

These proteins are activated during sprouting and the starch around the endosperm is converted to sugars. Later the prolamins are broken down to provide the young seeds with a source of nitrogen and energy giving the Triticeae seedling a great boost during early life.

Once the starch is converted to sugar it can be readily fermented by Saccharomyces cerevisiae. However, first the sprouting process should be stopped. In order to do this, the partially sprouted grains are placed in a roasting oven and roasted until the sprouts are sterilized and dried. This process of sprouting and drying is called malting. Then the roasted sprouts are ground, rehydrated and fermented. This produces a crude beer.

=== Gluten deamidation ===
The deamidation potential for wheats is discussed above. Glutens are generated by the wheat starch industry. Glutens however are more difficult to handle once starch and other proteins are removed, for example, alcohol-soluble glutens cannot be mixed with dairy since the alcohol denatures and precipitates dairy proteins. Therefore, gluten is often modified for commercial use by deamidation by treatment with acid at high temperatures, or enzymatic treatment with deamidase or transglutaminases. The increased charge increases the hydrophilicity of gliadins, causing them to stretch out in solution. Deamidation of 20% of glutamine side chains to glutamate suffices to generate a soluble product. This renders gluten soluble enough without alcohol to mix with other products like milk.

== Triticeae and human disease ==
Individuals who suffer from gluten-sensitive enteropathy/coeliac disease have an adverse reaction to the gluten in cultivars of Triticeae when eaten. In addition to bread wheat, rye and barley (which have similar glutens) are known to cause symptoms in coeliacs. Between 2 and 10% of gluten sensitive individuals are also sensitive to oats, but it is not clear how much of this is due to contamination of triticeae seeds in oats or allergic responses (versus intolerance). Therefore, when broadly applied the designation of gluten-free applies to foods bearing the seed storage proteins derived from Triticeae.
