= Kafirin =

Storage proteins found in sorghum

Kafirin is a class of prolamine storage protein found in grain sorghum.
