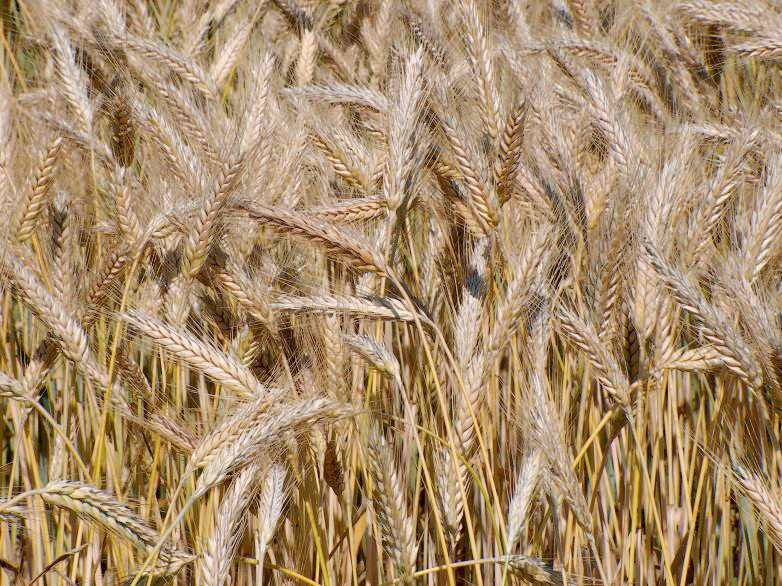

Scientific classification
- Kingdom: Plantae
- Clade: Tracheophytes
- Clade: Angiosperms
- Clade: Monocots
- Clade: Commelinids
- Order: Poales
- Family: Poaceae
- Subfamily: Pooideae
- Supertribe: Triticodae
- Tribe: Triticeae
- Genus: × Triticosecale; Wittm. ex A. Camus.

Species
- See text

Synonyms
- × Triticale Tscherm.-Seys. ex Müntzing

= Triticale =

Hybrid wheat/rye crop

Triticale (/trɪtɪˈkeɪliː/; × Triticosecale) is a hybrid of wheat (Triticum) and rye (Secale) first bred in laboratories during the late 19th century in Scotland and Germany. Commercially available triticale is almost always a second-generation hybrid, i.e., a cross between two kinds of primary (first-cross) triticales. As a rule, triticale combines the yield potential and grain quality of wheat with the disease and environmental tolerance (including soil conditions) of rye. Only in 1970 did the first commercial variety become available. Depending on the cultivar, triticale can more or less resemble either of its parents. It is grown mostly for forage or fodder, although some triticale-based foods can be purchased at health food stores, and it can be found in some breakfast cereals.

When crossing wheat and rye, wheat is used as the female parent and rye as the male parent (pollen donor). The resulting hybrid is sterile and must be treated with colchicine to induce polyploidy and thus the ability to reproduce itself.

In 1954, the University of Manitoba began the first North American triticale breeding program. Early breeding efforts concentrated on developing a high-yield, drought-tolerant human food crop species suitable for marginal wheat-producing areas.

The primary producers of triticale are Poland, Germany, Belarus, France and Russia. In 2014, according to the Food and Agriculture Organization (FAO), 17.1 million tons were harvested in 37 countries across the world.

The triticale hybrids are all amphidiploid, which means the plant is diploid for two genomes derived from different species. In other words, triticale is an allotetraploid. In earlier years, most work was done on octoploid triticale. Different ploidy levels have been created and evaluated over time. The tetraploids showed little promise, but hexaploid triticale was successful enough to find commercial application.

The CIMMYT (International Maize and Wheat Improvement Center) triticale improvement program was intended to improve food production and nutrition in developing countries. Triticale was thought to have potential in the production of bread and other food products, such as cookies, pasta, pizza dough and breakfast cereals. The protein content is higher than that of wheat, although the glutenin fraction is less. The grain has also been stated to have higher levels of lysine than wheat. Acceptance would require the milling industry to adapt to triticale, as the milling techniques employed for wheat are unsuited to triticale. Past research indicated that triticale could be used as a feed grain and, particularly, later research found that its starch is readily digested. As a feed grain, triticale is already well established and of high economic importance. It has received attention as a potential energy crop, and research is currently being conducted on the use of the crop's biomass in bioethanol production. Triticale has also been used to produce vodka.

== History ==
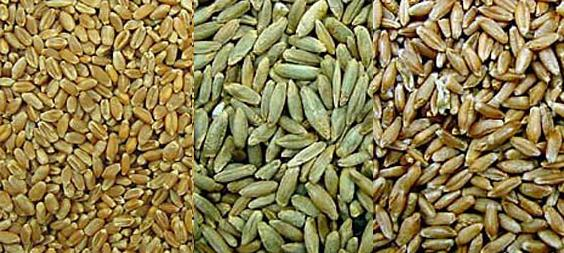
Wheat, rye, triticale

In the 19th century, crossing cultivars or species became better understood, allowing the controlled hybridization of more plants and animals. In 1873, Alexander Wilson first managed to manually fertilize the female organs of wheat flowers with rye pollen (male gametes), but found that the resulting plants were sterile, much the way the offspring of a horse and donkey is an infertile mule. Fifteen years later in 1888, a partially-fertile hybrid was produced by Wilhelm Rimpau, "Tritosecale Rimpaui Wittmack". Such hybrids germinate only when the chromosomes spontaneously double.

Up until 1937, "partially fertile" was all that was produced. In that year, it was discovered that the chemical colchicine, which is used both for general plant germination and as a treatment for gout, would force chromosome doubling by keeping them from pulling apart during cell division. Triticale had become viable, though at that point the cost of producing the seeds was disproportionate to the yield.

By the 1960s, triticale was being produced that was far more nutritious than normal wheat. However, it was a poorly-producing crop, sometimes yielding shriveled kernels, germinating poorly or prematurely, and did not bake well.

Modern triticale has overcome most of these problems, after decades of additional breeding and gene transfer with wheat and rye. Millions of acres/hectares of the crop are grown around the world, slowly increasing toward becoming a significant source of food-calories.

== Species ==
Triticale hybrids are currently classified by ploidy into three nothospecies:

- × Triticosecale semisecale (Mackey) K.Hammer & Filat. – tetraploid triticale. Unstable, but used in breeding bridging. Includes the following crosses:
  - Triticum monococcum × Secale cereale, genome AARR;
  - Alternative crosses, genome ABRR (mixogenome A/B).
- × Triticosecale neoblaringhemii A.Camus – hexaploid triticale. Stable, currently very successful in agriculture. May be produced by Secale cereale × Triticum turgidum, genome AABBRR.
- × Triticosecale rimpaui Wittm. – octaploid triticale. Not completely stable, mainly historical importance. May be produced by Secale cereale × Triticum aestivum, genome AABBDDRR.

The current treatment follows the Mac Key 2005 treatment of Triticum using a broad species concept based on genome composition. Traditional classifications used a narrow species concept based on the treatment of wheats by Dorofeev et al., 1979, and hence produced many more species names. The genome notation follows Taxonomy of wheat § Genome, with the rye genome notated as R.

== Biology and genetics ==
Earlier work with wheat-rye crosses was difficult due to low survival of the resulting hybrid embryo and spontaneous chromosome doubling. These two factors were difficult to predict and control. To improve the viability of the embryo and thus avoid its abortion, in vitro culture techniques were developed (Laibach, 1925). Colchicine was used as a chemical agent to double the chromosomes. After these developments, a new era of triticale breeding was introduced. Earlier triticale hybrids had four reproductive disorders, namely meiotic instability, high aneuploid frequency, low fertility and shriveled seed (Muntzing 1939; Krolow 1966). Cytogenetical studies were encouraged and well funded to overcome these problems.

It is especially difficult to see the expression of rye genes in the background of wheat cytoplasm and the predominant wheat nuclear genome. This makes it difficult to realise the potential of rye in disease resistance and ecological adaptation.

Triticale is essentially a self-fertilizing, or naturally inbred crop. This mode of reproduction results in a more homozygous genome. The crop is, however, adapted to this form of reproduction from an evolutionary point of view. Cross-fertilization is also possible, but it is not the primary form of reproduction.

Sr27 is a stem rust resistance gene which is commonly found in triticale. Originally from rye (Imperial rye), now (as of 2021) widely found in triticale. Located on the 3A chromosome arm, originally from 3R. Virulence has been observed in field by Puccinia graminis f. sp. secalis (Pgs) and in an artificial cross Pgs × Puccinia graminis f. sp. tritici (Pgt). When successful, Sr27 is among the few Srs that does not even allow the underdeveloped uredinia and slight degree of sporulation commonly allowed by most Srs. Instead there are necrotic or chlorotic flecks. Deployment in triticale in New South Wales and Queensland, Australia, however, rapidly showed virulence between 1982 and 1984 – the first virulence on this gene in the world. (This was especially associated with the cultivar Coorong.) Therefore, the International Maize and Wheat Improvement Center's triticale offerings were tested and many were found to depend solely on Sr27. Four years later, in 1988 virulence was found in South Africa. Sr27 has become less common in CIMMYT triticales since the mid-'80s.

== Conventional breeding approaches ==
Top triticale producers
- in 2022

Numbers in million tonnes
- 1. Poland: 5.44 (38.42%)
- 2. Germany: 1.93 (13.63%)
- 3. France: 1.61 (11.37%)
- 4. Belarus: 1.19 (8.4%)
- 5. Spain: 0.63 (4.45%)
- 6. China: 0.39 (2.75%)
- 7. Turkey: 0.32 (2.26%)
- 8. Russia: 0.31 (2.19%)
- 9. Austria: 0.29 (2.05%)
- 10. Czech Republic: 0.21 (1.48%)
- World total: 14.16

The aim of a triticale breeding programme is mainly focused on the improvement of quantitative traits, such as grain yield, nutritional quality and plant height, as well as traits which are more difficult to improve, such as earlier maturity and improved test weight (a measure of bulk density). These traits are controlled by more than one gene. Problems arise, however, because such polygenic traits involve the integration of several physiological processes in their expression. Thus the lack of single-gene control (or simple inheritance) results in low trait heritability (Zumelzú et al. 1998).

Since the induction of the International Maize and Wheat Improvement Center triticale breeding programme in 1964, the improvement in realised grain yield has been remarkable. In 1968, at Ciudad Obregón, Sonora, in northwest Mexico, the highest yielding triticale line produced 2.4 t/ha. Today, CIMMYT has released high yielding spring triticale lines (e.g. Pollmer-2) which have surpassed the 10 t/ha yield barrier under optimum production conditions.

Based on the commercial success of other hybrid crops, the use of hybrid triticales as a strategy for enhancing yield in favourable, as well as marginal, environments has proven successful over time. Earlier research conducted by CIMMYT made use of a chemical hybridising agent to evaluate heterosis in hexaploid triticale hybrids. To select the most promising parents for hybrid production, test crosses conducted in various environments are required, because the variance of their specific combining ability under differing environmental conditions is the most important component in evaluating their potential as parents to produce promising hybrids. The prediction of general combining ability of any triticale plant from the performance of its parents is only moderate with respect to grain yield. Commercially exploitable yield advantages of hybrid triticale cultivars is dependent on improving parent heterosis and on advances in inbred-line development.

Triticale is useful as an animal feed grain. However, it is necessary to improve its milling and bread-making quality aspects to increase its potential for human consumption. The relationship between the constituent wheat and rye genomes were noted to produce meiotic irregularities, and genome instability and incompatibility presented numerous problems when attempts were made to improve triticale. This led to two alternative methods to study and improve its reproductive performance, namely, the improvement of the number of grains per floral spikelet and its meiotic behaviour. The number of grains per spikelet has an associated low heritability value (de Zumelzú et al. 1998). In improving yield, indirect selection (the selection of correlated/related traits other than that to be improved) is not necessarily as effective as direct selection. (Gallais 1984)

Lodging (the toppling over of the plant stem, especially under windy conditions) resistance is a polygenically inherited (expression is controlled by many genes) trait, and has thus been an important breeding aim in the past. The use of dwarfing genes, known as Rht genes, which have been incorporated from both Triticum and Secale, has resulted in a decrease of up to 20 centimetres (7.9 in) in plant height without causing any adverse effects.

A 2013 study found that hybrids have better yield stability under yield stress than do inbred lines.

== Application of newer techniques ==
Abundant information exists concerning R-genes (for disease resistance) in wheat, and a continuously updated on-line catalogue, the Catalogue of Gene Symbols, of these genes can be found at . Another online database of cereal rust resistance genes is available at . Unfortunately, less is known about rye and particularly triticale R-genes. Many R-genes have been transferred to wheat from its wild relatives, and appear in such papers and catalogues, thus making them available for triticale breeding. The two mentioned databases are significant contributors to improving the genetic variability of the triticale gene pool through gene (or more specifically, allele) provision. Genetic variability is essential for progress in breeding. In addition, genetic variability can also be achieved by producing new primary triticales, which essentially means the reconstitution of triticale, and the development of various hybrids involving triticale, such as triticale-rye hybrids. In this way, some chromosomes from the R genome have been replaced by some from the D genome. The resulting so-called substitution and translocation triticale facilitates the transfer of R-genes.

=== Introgression ===
Introgression involves the crossing of closely related plant relatives, and results in the transfer of 'blocks' of genes, i.e. larger segments of chromosomes compared to single genes. R-genes are generally introduced within such blocks, which are usually incorporated/translocated/introgressed into the distal (extreme) regions of chromosomes of the crop being introgressed. Genes located in the proximal areas of chromosomes may be completely linked (very closely spaced), thus preventing or severely hampering recombination, which is necessary to incorporate such blocks. Molecular markers (small lengths of DNA of a characterized/known sequence) are used to 'tag' and thus track such translocations. A weak colchicine solution has been employed to increase the probability of recombination in the proximal chromosome regions, and thus the introduction of the translocation to that region. The resultant translocation of smaller blocks that indeed carry the R-gene(s) of interest has decreased the probability of introducing unwanted genes.

The Sr59 resistance gene was introgressed into wheat from the 2R chromosome of rye. However this was actually done through triticale. Triticale has been the amphiploid for several such rye ⇨ wheat introgressions.

A 2014 study found that Ddw1 dwarfing gene from the rye 5R chromosome also provides Fusarium head blight (FHB) resistance in this host.

=== Production of doubled haploids ===
Doubled haploid (DH) plants have the potential to save much time in the development of inbred lines. This is achieved in a single generation, as opposed to many, which would otherwise occupy much physical space/facilities. DHs also express deleterious recessive alleles otherwise masked by dominance effects in a genome containing more than one copy of each chromosome (and thus more than one copy of each gene). Various techniques exist to create DHs. The in vitro culture of anthers and microspores is most often used in cereals, including triticale. These two techniques are referred to as androgenesis, which refers to the development of pollen. Many plant species and cultivars within species, including triticale, are recalcitrant in that the success rate of achieving whole newly generated (diploid) plants is very low. Genotype by culture medium interaction is responsible for varying success rates, as is a high degree of microspore abortion during culturing. The response of parental triticale lines to anther culture is known to be correlated to the response of their progeny. Chromosome elimination is another method of producing DHs, and involves hybridisation of wheat with maize (Zea mays L.), followed by auxin treatment and the artificial rescue of the resultant haploid embryos before they naturally abort. This technique is applied rather extensively to wheat. Its success is in large part due to the insensitivity of maize pollen to the crossability inhibitor genes known as Kr1 and Kr2 that are expressed in the floral style of many wheat cultivars. The technique is unfortunately less successful in triticale. However, Imperata cylindrica (a grass) was found to be just as effective as maize with respect to the production of DHs in both wheat and triticale.

=== Application of molecular markers ===
An important advantage of biotechnology applied to plant breeding is the speeding up of cultivar release that would otherwise take 8–12 years. It is the process of selection that is actually enhanced, i.e., retaining that which is desirable or promising and ridding that which is not. This carries with it the aim of changing the genetic structure of the plant population. The website is a valuable resource for marker assisted selection (MAS) protocols relating to R-genes in wheat. MAS is a form of indirect selection. The Catalogue of Gene Symbols mentioned earlier is an additional source of molecular and morphological markers. Again, triticale has not been well characterised with respect to molecular markers, although an abundance of rye molecular markers makes it possible to track rye chromosomes and segments thereof within a triticale background.

Yield improvements of up to 20% have been achieved in hybrid triticale cultivars due to heterosis. This raises the question of what inbred lines should be crossed (to produce hybrids) with each other as parents to maximize yield in their hybrid progeny. This is termed the 'combining ability' of the parental lines. The identification of good combining ability at an early stage in the breeding programme can reduce the costs associated with 'carrying' a large number of plants (literally thousands) through it, and thus forms part of efficient selection. Combining ability is assessed by taking into consideration all available information on descent (genetic relatedness), morphology, qualitative (simply inherited) traits and biochemical and molecular markers. Exceptionally little information exists on the use of molecular markers to predict heterosis in triticale. Molecular markers are generally accepted as better predictors than morphological markers (of agronomic traits) due to their insensitivity to variation in environmental conditions.

A useful molecular marker known as a simple sequence repeat (SSR) is used in breeding with respect to selection. SSRs are segments of a genome composed of tandem repeats of a short sequence of nucleotides, usually two to six base pairs. They are popular tools in genetics and breeding because of their relative abundance compared to other marker types, a high degree of polymorphism (number of variants), and easy assaying by polymerase chain reaction. However, they are expensive to identify and develop. Comparative genome mapping has revealed a high degree of similarity in terms of sequence colinearity between closely related crop species. This allows the exchange of such markers within a group of related species, such as wheat, rye and triticale. One study established a 58% and 39% transferability rate to triticale from wheat and rye, respectively. Transferability refers to the phenomenon where the sequence of DNA nucleotides flanking the SSR locus (position on the chromosome) is sufficiently homologous (similar) between genomes of closely related species. Thus, DNA primers (generally, a short sequence of nucleotides used to direct the copying reaction during PCR) designed for one species can be used to detect SSRs in related species. SSR markers are available in wheat and rye, but very few, if any, are available for triticale.

=== Genetic transformation ===
The genetic transformation of crops involves the incorporation of 'foreign' genes or, rather, very small DNA fragments compared to introgression discussed earlier. Amongst other uses, transformation is a useful tool to introduce new traits or characteristics into the transformed crop. Two methods are commonly employed: infectious bacterial-mediated (usually Agrobacterium) transfer and biolistics, with the latter being most commonly applied to allopolyploid cereals such as triticale. Agrobacterium-mediated transformation, however, holds several advantages, such as a low level of DNA rearrangement in the transgenic plant, a low number of introduced copies of the transforming DNA, stable integration of an a-priori characterized T-DNA fragment (containing the DNA expressing the trait of interest) and an expected higher level of transgene expression. Triticale has, until recently, only been transformed via biolistics, with a 3.3% success rate. Little has been documented on Agrobacterium-mediated transformation of wheat: while no data existed with respect to triticale until 2005, the success rate in later work was nevertheless low.

== Research ==
Triticale holds much promise as a commercial crop, as it has the potential to address specific problems within the cereal industry. Research is currently being conducted worldwide in places like Stellenbosch University in South Africa.

Conventional plant breeding has helped establish triticale as a valuable crop, especially where conditions are less favourable for wheat cultivation. Triticale being a synthesized grain notwithstanding, many initial limitations, such as an inability to reproduce due to infertility and seed shrivelling, low yield and poor nutritional value, have been largely eliminated.

Tissue culture techniques with respect to wheat and triticale have seen continuous improvements, but the isolation and culturing of individual microspores seems to hold the most promise. Many molecular markers can be applied to marker-assisted gene transfer, but the expression of R-genes in the new genetic background of triticale remains to be investigated. More than 750 wheat microsatellite primer pairs are available in public wheat breeding programmes, and could be exploited in the development of SSRs in triticale. Another type of molecular marker, single nucleotide polymorphism (SNP), is likely to have a significant impact on the future of triticale breeding.

== Health concerns ==
Like both its hybrid parents – wheat and rye – triticale contains gluten and is therefore unsuitable for people with gluten-related disorders, such as celiac disease, non-celiac gluten sensitivity and wheat allergy, among others.

== In fiction ==
An episode of the popular TV series Star Trek, "The Trouble with Tribbles", revolved around the protection of a grain developed from triticale. This grain was named "quadro-triticale" by writer David Gerrold at the suggestion of producer Gene Coon, with four distinct lobes per kernel. In that episode Mr. Spock attributes the ancestry of the nonfictional grain to 20th-century Canada.

Indeed, in 1953 the University of Manitoba began the first North American triticale breeding program. Early breeding efforts concentrated on developing a high-yield, drought-tolerant human food crop species suitable for marginal wheat-producing areas. (Later in the episode, Chekov claims that the fictional quadro-triticale was a "Russian invention".)

A later episode titled "More Tribbles, More Troubles", in the animated series, also written by Gerrold, dealt with "quinto-triticale", an improvement on the original, having apparently five lobes per kernel.

Three decades later the spinoff series Star Trek: Deep Space Nine revisited quadro-triticale and the depredations of the Tribbles in the episode "Trials and Tribble-ations".

Triticale was also a plot device in the season 2 episode Those Old Scientists of Star Trek: Strange New Worlds, a crossover with Star Trek: Lower Decks (2023).
