= Glisodin =

Nutritional supplement

Glisodin is the registered trademark of a nutritional supplement based on two constituents:

- Cantaloupe extract, which typically contains high quantities of the enzyme superoxide dismutase (SOD)
- Gliadin, a wheat protein designed to protect SOD during the digestive process

== Background ==
As oxygen metabolizes in the body, potentially harmful reactive oxygen species (ROS) are created. The human body implements an antioxidant defense system to protect against ROS. In the event that these defenses are overpowered by the ROS, cell damage results (which is a major cause of aging in the body).

Superoxide dismutase (SOD) helps to slow the creation of ROS, ultimately playing a key role in the defense against cell damage. However, due to a very fragile molecular structure, it is particularly prone to damage from stomach acids and digestive enzymes when taken orally. Gliadin, which is well known as a carrier protein for controlled drug release, helps to protect SOD.

== Research ==
A wide range of clinical research has been undertaken to study glisodin's antioxidant capacities. This has extended into a wide range of applications, including protection from ultraviolet radiation, athletic performance, cardiovascular health, ischemia and reperfusion injury.

A group of researchers in France and Germany led by Dr. Claus Muth concluded that glisodin is helpful in protecting against DNA damage caused by hyperbaric oxidation. A 2005 study at Rutgers University also concluded that glisodin is helpful in enhancing athletic performance while minimizing fatigue.

== See also ==
- Superoxide dismutase
- Oxidative stress
- Antioxidants
