= Zein =

Proteins found in maize (corn)

Identifiers
- Symbol: Zein
- Pfam: PF01559
- InterPro: IPR002530
Available protein structures:
- PDB: IPR002530 PF01559 (ECOD; PDBsum)
- AlphaFold: IPR002530; PF01559

Zein (/ˈziːɪn/ ZEE-in) is a class of prolamine protein found in maize. It is usually manufactured as a powder from corn gluten meal. Zein is one of the best understood plant proteins. Pure zein is clear, odorless, tasteless, hard, water-insoluble, and edible, and it has a variety of industrial and food uses.

== Commercial uses ==
Historically, zein has been used in the manufacture of a wide variety of commercial products, including coatings for paper cups, soda bottle cap linings, clothing fabric, buttons, adhesives, coatings and binders. The dominant historical use of zein was in the textile fibers market where it was produced under the name "Vicara". With the development of synthetic alternatives, the use of zein in this market eventually disappeared. By using electrospinning, zein fibers have again been produced in the lab, where additional research will be performed to re-enter the fiber market. It can be used as a water and grease resistant coating for paperboards and allows recyclability.

Zein's properties make it valuable in processed foods and pharmaceuticals, in competition with insect shellac. It is now used as a coating for candy, nuts, fruit, pills, and other encapsulated foods and drugs. In the United States, it may be labeled as "confectioner's glaze" (which may also refer to shellac-based glazes) and used as a coating on bakery products or as "vegetable protein." It is classified as Generally Recognized as Safe (GRAS) by the U.S. Food and Drug Administration. For pharmaceutical coating, zein is preferred over food shellac, since it is all natural and requires less testing per the USP monographs.

Zein can be further processed into resins and other bioplastic polymers, which can be extruded or rolled into a variety of plastic products. With increasing environmental concerns about synthetic coatings and the current higher prices of hydrocarbon-based petrochemicals, there is increased focus on zein as a raw material for a variety of nontoxic and renewable polymer applications, particularly in the paper industry. Other reasons for a renewed interest in zein include concern about the landfill costs of plastics, and consumer interest in natural substances. There are also a number of potential new food industry applications.

Researchers at the University of Illinois at Urbana-Champaign and at William Wrigley Jr. Company have recently been studying the possibility of using zein to replace some of the gum base in chewing gum. They are also studying medical applications such as using the zein molecule to "carry biocompounds to targeted sites in the human body". There are a number of potential food safety applications that may be possible for zein-based packaging according to several researchers. A military contractor is researching the use of zein to protect MRE food packages. Other packaging/food safety applications that have been researched include frozen foods, ready-to-eat chicken, and cheese and liquid eggs. Food researchers in Japan have noted the ability of the zein molecule to act as a water barrier.

While there are numerous existing and potential uses for zein, the main barrier to greater commercial success has been its historic high cost until recently. Zein pricing is now very competitive with food shellac. Zein may be extracted as a byproduct in the manufacturing process for ethanol or in new off-shore manufacture.

== Gene family ==
Alpha-prolamins are the major seed storage proteins of species of the grass tribe Andropogoneae. They are unusually rich in glutamine, proline, alanine, and leucine residues and their sequences show a series of tandem repeats presumed to be the result of multiple intragenic duplication. In Zea mays (Maize), the 22 kDa and 19 kDa zeins are encoded by a large multigene family and are the major seed storage proteins accounting for 70% of the total zein fraction. Structurally the 22 kDa and 19 kDa zeins are composed of nine adjacent, topologically antiparallel helices clustered within a distorted cylinder. The 22 kDa alpha-zeins are encoded by 23 genes; twenty-two of the members are found in a roughly tandem array forming a dense gene cluster. The expressed genes in the cluster are interspersed with nonexpressed genes. Some of the expressed genes differ in their transcriptional regulation. Gene amplification appears to be in blocks of genes explaining the rapid and compact expansion of the cluster during the evolution of maize.

== Other biodegradable polymers ==
- Cellophane
- Plastarch material
- Poly-3-hydroxybutyrate
- Polycaprolactone
- Polyglycolide
- Polylactic acid
