= Glutelin =

Identifiers
- Symbol: Glutelin
- InterPro: IPR000480
Available protein structures:
- PDB: IPR000480
- AlphaFold: IPR000480

Glutelins are a class of prolamin proteins found in the endosperm of certain seeds of the grass family. They constitute a major component of the protein composite collectively referred to as gluten. Glutenin is the most common glutelin, as it is found in wheat and is responsible for some of the refined baking properties in bread wheat. The glutelins of barley and rye have also been identified. Glutelins are the primary protein form of energy storage in the endosperm of rice grains.

This class was originally differentiated from prolamins by Thomas Burr Osborne according to its low solubility. Modern analysis now considers glutelins as a low-solubility subclass of prolamins.

Glutelins are soluble in dilute acids or bases, detergents, chaotropic agents, or reducing agents. They are also rich in hydrophobic amino acids, with a content of phenylalanine, valine, tyrosine, proline and leucine corresponding to approximately 45% of the amino acid sequence of Glutelin-2 (UniProtKB access code P04706.1), though that specific amino acid profile is not characteristic of all glutelins. There are typically both high-molecular-weight (HMW) and low-molecular-weight (LMW) glutelins in most grass species. These proteins cross-link with themselves and other proteins during baking via disulfide bonds. The LMW ones are similar to Gliadin.

Individuals possessing the HLA-DQ8 class II antigen receptor gene may demonstrate increased reactivity to high-molecular weight glutenin (as measured by increased levels of pro-inflammatory cytokine interferon gamma), though such observations are limited to one patient.
