= Storage protein =

Storage proteins serve as biological reserves of metal ions and amino acids, used by organisms. They are found in plant seeds, egg whites, and milk.

Ferritin is an example of a storage protein that stores iron. Iron is a component of heme, which is contained in the transport protein, hemoglobin and in cytochromes.

Some storage proteins store amino acids. Storage proteins' amino acids are used in embryonic development of animals or plants. Two amino acid storage proteins in animals are casein and ovalbumin.

Seeds, particularly of leguminous plants, contain high concentrations of storage proteins. Up to 25 percent of the dry weight of the seed can be composed of storage proteins. The best known storage protein in wheat is the prolamin gliadin, a component of gluten.
