= Exercise-induced anaphylaxis =

Severe allergic reaction due to physical activity

Exercise-induced anaphylaxis (EIA, EIAn, EIAs) is a rare condition in which anaphylaxis, a serious or life-threatening allergic response, is brought on by physical activity. Approximately 5–15% of all reported cases of anaphylaxis are thought to be exercise-induced.

The exact proportion of the population with EIA is unknown, but a 2001 study of 76,229 Japanese junior high students showed that the frequency of EIA was 0.031%.

Exercise-induced anaphylaxis is not a widely known or understood condition, with the first research on the disorder only having been conducted in the past 40 years. A case report in 1979 on EIA was the first research of its kind, where a patient was described to experience anaphylactic shock related to exercise 5–24 hours following the consumption of shellfish.

The condition is thought to be more prevalent in women, with two studies of EIA patients reporting a ratio of 2:1 for females:males with the disorder. There is, however, thought to be no link to ethnicity.

Survey results from EIA patients have shown that the average number of attacks per year is 14.5. However, most sufferers of EIA report that both severity and frequency of attacks decrease over time.

== Symptoms ==
The anaphylaxis campaign splits symptoms of EIA into two categories: mild and severe. Mild symptoms may include "widespread flushing of the skin", hives or urticaria, swelling of the body (angioedema), swelling of the lips, and nausea or vomiting. More severe symptoms might include the swelling of the tongue, difficulty in swallowing or breathing, constriction of the airways, feeling faint, and unconsciousness.

Symptoms can start immediately following exercise, but 90% of patients report experiencing an attack 30 minutes following activity.

Figure 1; a table by Barg et al. showing the frequency of different EIA symptoms in two different studies.
	Frequency of EIA symptoms in studied population (%)	
Symptom	Wade et al.	Shadick et al.
Itching	92	92
Urticaria	83	86
Angioedema	78	72
Flushing	75	70
Shortness of breath	59	51
Dysphagia	-	34
Chest tightness	-	33
Loss of consciousness	32	32
Diaphoresis	43	32
Headache	30	28
Nausea/diarrhoea/colic	30	28
Throat constriction	-	25

A paper by Sheffer and Austen (1980) splits an EIA event into four distinct stages: prodromal, early, fully developed, and late. Characteristic symptoms of the prodromal stage include redness and itching. In the early stage, generalised urticaria develops. If the reaction does not diminish, it may become fully developed EIA, in which gastrointestinal symptoms and constriction of the airway may occur. The late phase, which follows recovery from the reaction, includes frontal headaches and a feeling of fatigue; these symptoms may manifest themselves up to 72 hours following onset of the reaction.

Cardiovascular symptoms are reported in 1/3 of patients diagnosed with EIA.

== Food-dependent exercise-induced anaphylaxis ==
Food-dependent exercise-induced anaphylaxis (FDEIA) is a subcategory of the disorder where exercise only invokes a reaction when followed by the ingestion of a food allergen. Patients whose EIA is food-dependent are thought to make up from one third to a half of all EIA cases. In a 2001 study of 76,229 Japanese junior high students, 0.017% of students were found to suffer from the condition.

In European countries, the most common trigger foods for FDEIA are tomatoes, cereals and peanuts. In Japan, FDEIA is most commonly triggered by omega-5-gliadins, an allergen found in wheat. Other common foods thought to be linked to FDEIA include shellfish, seeds, dairy (in particular cow's milk), fruits and vegetables (such as grapes, onions and oranges), meats, and even mushrooms. FDEIA has also been linked to the allergy to red meat referred to as the Alpha-gal (or α-Gal) syndrome.

Ingestion of the trigger food most often precedes exercise by minutes or hours in cases of an attack; there are, however, reported incidents of attacks occurring when ingestion transpires shortly following activity. While a lot remains unknown about the pathophysiology of food-dependent exercise-induced anaphylaxis (FDEIA), one theory points to changes in pH; this theory is based on the fact that pH becomes more acidic in the muscles and serum following exercise. Decreasing pH is associated with an increase in mast cell degranulation, a key component to the immune response, and one study found that, when patients with FDEIA are given the antacid sodium bicarbonate prior to exercise, they do not experience FDEIA symptoms.

== Common triggers ==
Exercise-induced anaphylaxis is most commonly brought on by aerobic exercise. It is most often caused by higher levels of exertion, such as jogging, but can be brought on by milder activities, such as a gentle walk. In a 1999 study, 78% of sufferers reported that attacks were frequently caused by jogging, whereas 42% reported symptoms following brisk walking.

There are several factors outside of food and exercise that have been suggested to increase the risk of an EIA attack. These include the consumption of alcohol, exposure to pollen, extreme temperatures, the taking of non-steroidal anti-inflammatory drugs (NSAIDs), and even certain phases of the menstrual cycle.

== Pathophysiology ==
The pathophysiology surrounding EIA and FDEIA is not yet fully understood, but there are several theories.

Research shows that histamine, a chemical involved in the allergic response, plays a key role in EIA. Increased histamine levels in the blood plasma have been recorded during incidents of both EIA and FDEIA. Morphological changes in mast cells in the skin of EIA patients have been observed following exercise, and are comparable to changes occurring in atopic patients following exposure to an allergen.

Theories for the pathophysiology of EIA include increased gastrointestinal permeability, increased tissue enzyme activity, and blood flow redistribution.

=== Gastrointestinal permeability ===
Exercise is known to increase absorption from the gastrointestinal tract. It is theorised that increased or altered gastrointestinal permeability enhances contact of allergens with the gut-associated immune system. In some FDEIA patients, the appearance and/or severity of symptoms depends on the amount of the patient's trigger food ingested. An increase in gut permeability may also increase the risk of absorption of 'partially digested allergenic proteins'. Supporting research for this theory includes a study by Matsuo et al. (2005), where wheat-dependent EIA sufferers were found to have omega-5-gliadins in their sera following exercise and consumption of wheat, but not in patients that ingested wheat only.

=== Increased tissue enzymatic activity ===
Another theory is that exercise and aspirin could activate tissue transglutaminase in intestinal mucus. Omega-5-gliadins, a compound found in wheat that is commonly associated with FDEIA, is cross-linked by transglutaminase, resulting in large formations of peptide aggregates, and leads to an increase in IgE binding.

=== Blood flow redistribution ===
During exercise, blood is redistributed from inactive to active tissues in the body. It has been suggested that food-sensitised immune cells associated with the gut do not evoke anaphylactic symptoms so long as they remain in a local circulation. The theory suggests that if these sensitised cells are shifted to the skin and/or skeletal muscles following exercise, FDEIA symptoms are likely to occur. A 2010 study demonstrated that food allergens were well tolerated by mast cells in the intestinal tract, and thus no symptoms occurred at rest. Mast cells are structurally different in the gut than those found in the skin or skeletal muscles, and thus could be induced by food allergens.

== Treatment ==
If exercise is stopped when symptoms are first detected, improvement in condition normally occurs within minutes, and no further treatment is required.

Common treatments for the condition include taking regular anti-histamines, the use of an epinephrine injector (commonly known as an EpiPen), and through abstinence of exercise. In a 1999 study, 56% of sufferers reported the use of anti-histamines as treatment for their EIA, and 31% reported having treated the condition with epinephrine. Many patients reported treating the condition with changes in behaviour, with 44% of EIA sufferers reporting having reduced the incidence of attacks by avoiding exercise during "extremely hot or cold weather", 37% by avoiding trigger foods, 36% by refraining from exercise during allergy season, and 33% during high humidity.
