= Secalin =

Secalin is a prolamin glycoprotein found in the grain rye, Secale cereale.

Secalin is one of the forms of gluten proteins that people with coeliac disease cannot tolerate, and thus rye should be avoided by people with this disease. It is generally recommended that such people follow a gluten free diet.
