= Prolamin =

Type of plant storage protein

Prolamins are a group of plant storage proteins characterised by a high glutamine and proline amino acid content. They are found in plants, mainly in the seeds of cereal grains such as wheat (gliadin), barley (hordein), rye (secalin), corn (zein), sorghum (kafirin), and oats (avenin). They have poor solubility in water and solubilize best in strong alcohol (70–80%), light acid, and alkaline solutions. The prolamins of the tribe Triticeae, such as wheat gliadin, and related proteins (see Triticeae glutens) are known to trigger coeliac disease, an autoimmune condition, in genetically predisposed individuals.

Maize and sorghum prolamins are sorted by molecular weight into four classes, α, β, γ and δ. Alpha- and delta- prolamins cluster in a broad phylogenetic group (Group 1). The rest cluster into Group 2. Group 1 is widely duplicated in the two plants. A database of Triticeae prolamins (glutens) is available. There does not seem to be an analysis that tries to cluster both sources of prolamins into a grand classification.

== See also ==
- Gluten-related disorders
- Oat sensitivity
