= Gluten =

Group of cereal grain proteins

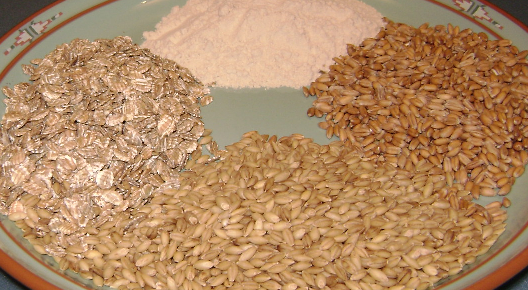
Examples of sources of gluten (clockwise from top): wheat as flour, spelt, barley, and rye as rolled flakes.

Gluten is a structural protein complex naturally found in certain cereal grains. The term gluten usually refers to the elastic network of a wheat grain's proteins, gliadin and glutenin primarily, which forms readily with the addition of water and often kneading in the case of bread dough. The types of grains that contain gluten include all species of wheat (common wheat, durum, spelt, khorasan, emmer, and einkorn), barley, rye, and some cultivars of oat; moreover, cross hybrids of any of these cereal grains also contain gluten, e.g. triticale. Gluten makes up 75–85% of the total protein in bread wheat.

Glutens, especially Triticeae glutens, have unique viscoelastic and adhesive properties, which give dough its elasticity, helping it rise and keep its shape and often leaving the final product with a chewy texture. These properties, and its relatively low cost, make gluten valuable to both food and non-food industries.

Wheat gluten is composed of mainly two types of proteins: the glutenins and the gliadins, which in turn can be divided into high molecular and low molecular glutenins and α/β, γ and Ω gliadins. Its homologous seed storage proteins, in barley, are referred to as hordeins, in rye, secalins, and in oats, avenins. These protein classes are collectively referred to as "gluten". The storage proteins in other grains, such as maize (zeins) and rice (rice protein), are sometimes called gluten, but they do not cause harmful effects in people with celiac disease.

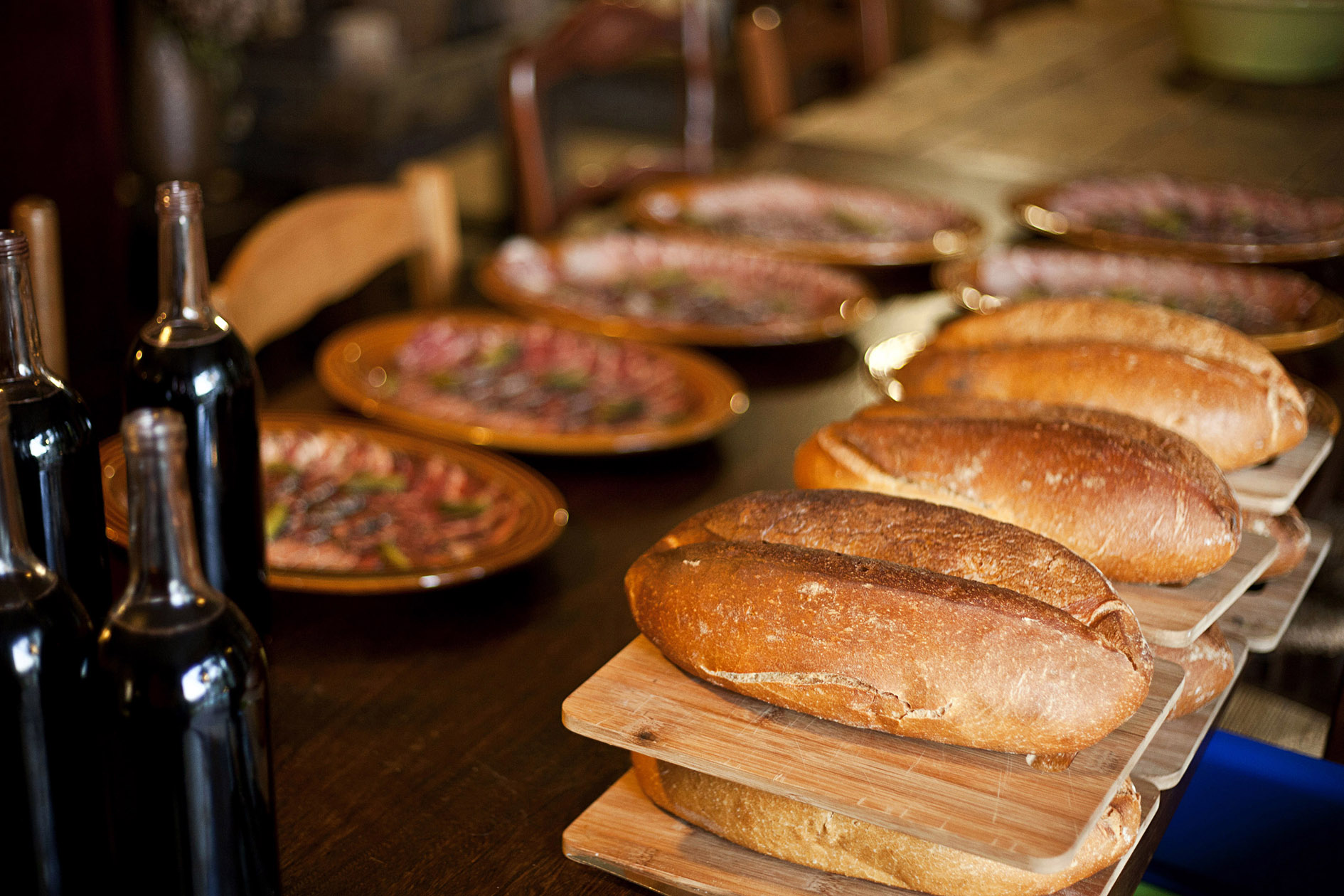
Bread produced from wheat grains contains gluten.

Gluten can trigger adverse inflammatory, immunological, and autoimmune reactions in some people. The spectrum of gluten related disorders includes celiac disease in 1–2% of the general population, non-celiac gluten sensitivity in 0.5–13% of the general population, as well as dermatitis herpetiformis, gluten ataxia and other neurological disorders. These disorders are treated by a gluten-free diet.

== Uses ==
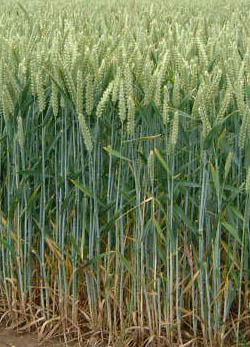
Wheat, a prime source of gluten.

=== Bread products ===
Gluten forms when glutenin molecules cross-link via disulfide bonds to form a submicroscopic network attached to gliadin, which contributes viscosity (thickness) and extensibility to the mix. If this dough is leavened with yeast, fermentation produces carbon dioxide bubbles, which, trapped by the gluten network, cause the dough to rise. Baking coagulates the gluten, which, along with starch, stabilizes the shape of the final product. Gluten content has been contributing as a factor in the staling of bread, possibly because it binds water through hydration.

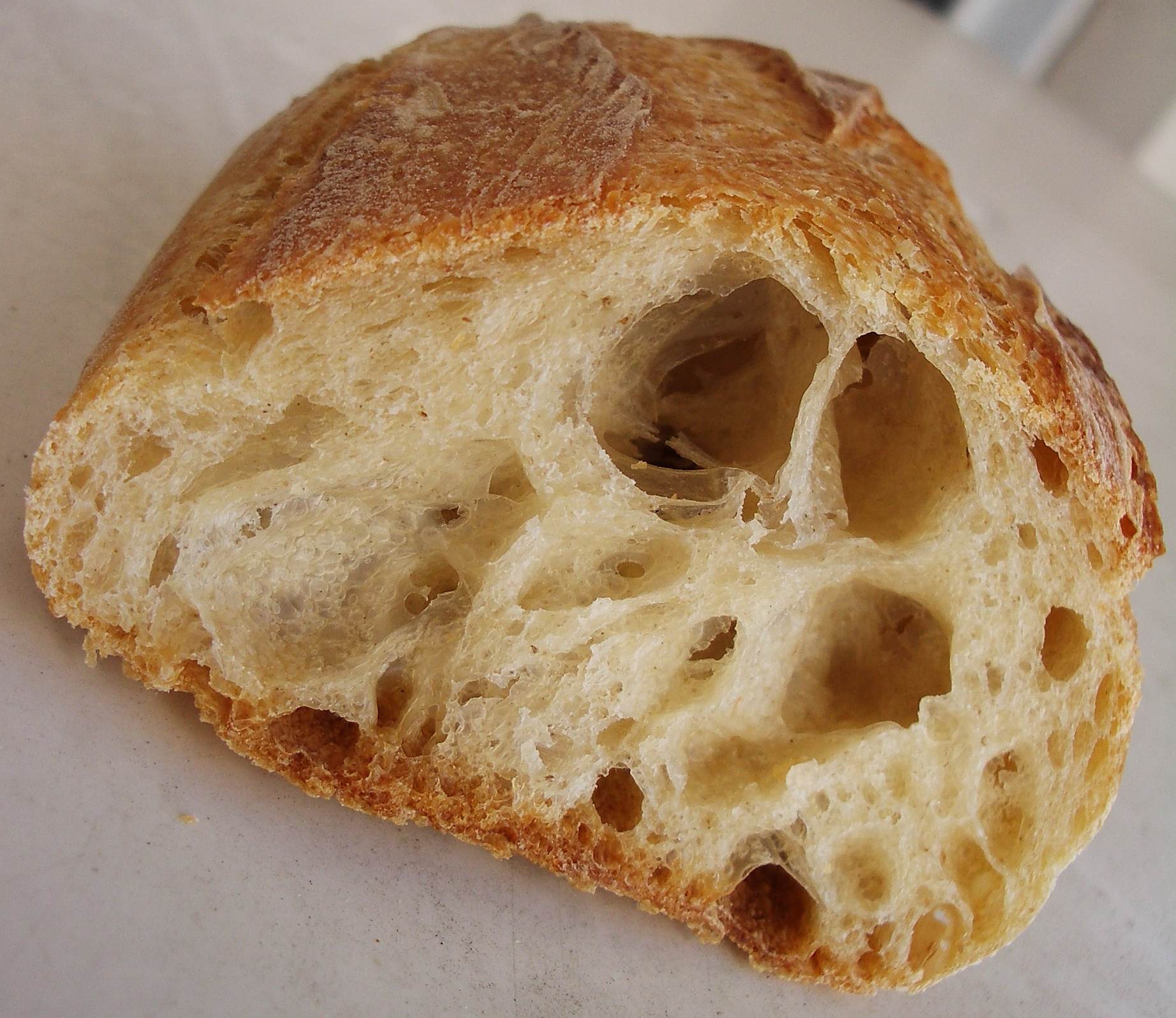
Cross-section of a baguette, showing a strong gluten network.

The formation of gluten affects the texture of the baked goods. Gluten's attainable elasticity is proportional to its content of glutenins with low molecular weights, as this portion contains the preponderance of the sulfur atoms responsible for the cross-linking in the gluten network. Using flour with higher gluten content leads to chewier doughs such as those found in pizza and bagels, while using flour with less gluten content yields tender baked goods such as pastry products.

Generally, bread flours are high in gluten (hard wheat); pastry flours have a lower gluten content. Kneading promotes the formation of gluten strands and cross-links, creating baked products that are chewier (as opposed to more brittle or crumbly). The "chewiness" increases as the dough is kneaded for longer. An increased moisture content in the dough enhances gluten development, and very wet doughs left to rise for a long time require no kneading (see no-knead bread). Shortening inhibits formation of cross-links and is used, along with diminished water and less kneading, when a tender and flaky product, such as a pie crust, is desired.

The strength and elasticity of gluten in flour is measured in the baking industry using a farinograph. This gives the baker a measurement of quality for different varieties of flours when developing recipes for various baked goods.

==== Added gluten ====
In industrial production, a slurry of wheat flour is kneaded vigorously by machinery until the gluten agglomerates into a mass. This mass is collected by centrifugation, then transported through several stages integrated in a continuous process. About 65% of the water in the wet gluten is removed by means of a screw press; the remainder is sprayed through an atomizer nozzle into a drying chamber, where it remains at an elevated temperature for a short time to allow the water to evaporate without denaturing the gluten. The process yields a flour-like powder with a 7% moisture content, which is air cooled and pneumatically transported to a receiving vessel. In the final step, the processed gluten is sifted and milled to produce a uniform product.

This flour-like powder, when added to ordinary flour dough, may help improve the dough's ability to increase in volume. The resulting mixture also increases the bread's structural stability and chewiness. Gluten-added dough must be worked vigorously to induce it to rise to its full capacity; an automatic bread machine or food processor may be required for high-gluten kneading. Generally, higher gluten levels are associated with higher overall protein content.

=== Imitation meats ===
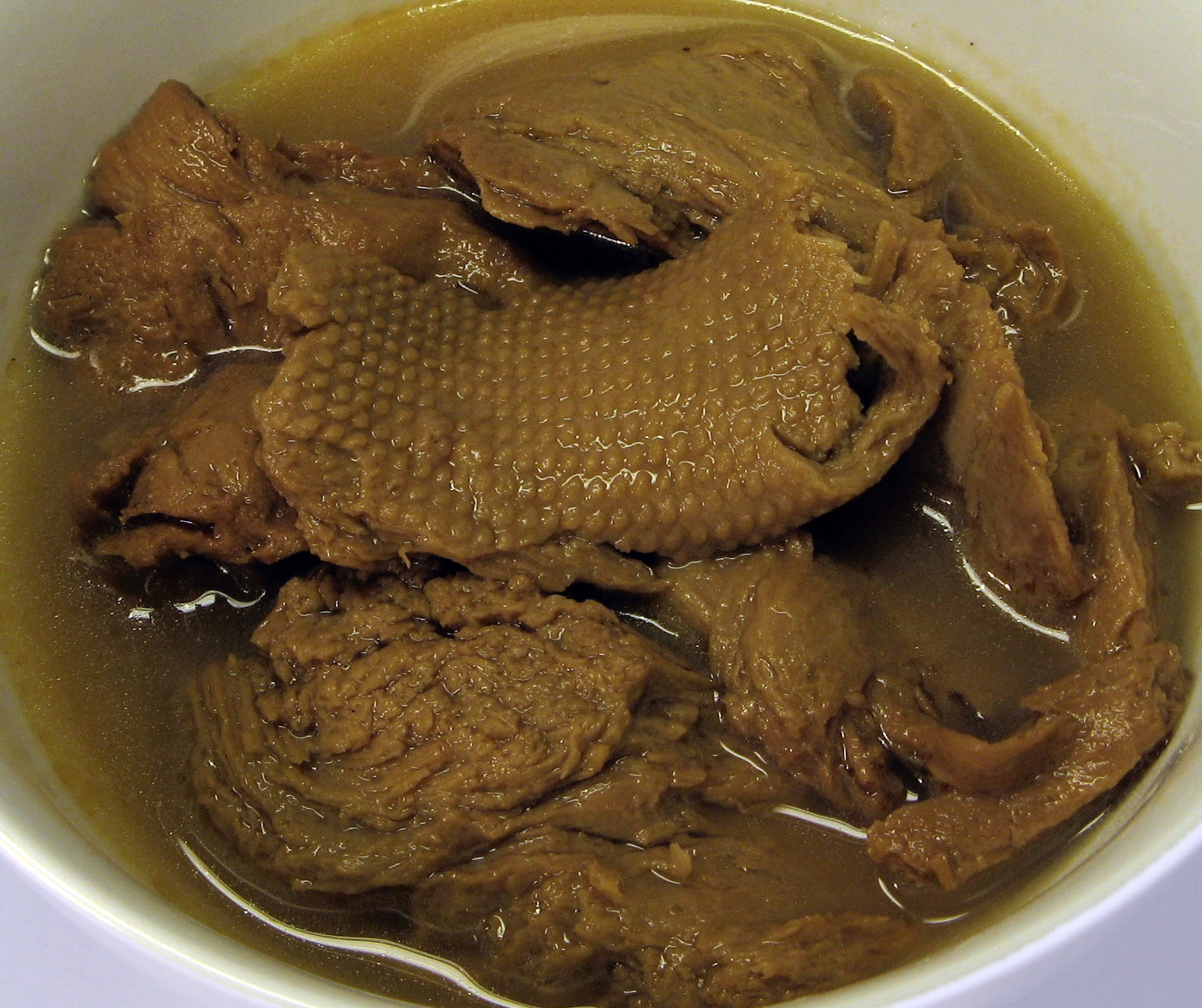
Gluten is often used in imitation meats (such as this mock duck) to provide supplemental protein in vegetarian diets.

Gluten, especially wheat gluten (seitan), is often the basis for imitation meats resembling beef, chicken, duck (see mock duck), fish and pork. When cooked in broth, gluten absorbs some of the surrounding liquid (including the flavor) and becomes firm to the bite. This use of gluten is a popular means of adding supplemental protein to many vegetarian diets. In home or restaurant cooking, wheat gluten is prepared from flour by kneading the flour under water, agglomerating the gluten into an elastic network known as a dough, and then washing out the starch.

=== Other consumer products ===
Gluten is often present in beer and soy sauce, and can be used as a stabilizing agent in more unexpected food products, such as ice cream and ketchup. Foods of this kind may therefore present problems for a small number of consumers because the hidden gluten constitutes a hazard for people with celiac disease and gluten sensitivities. The protein content of some pet foods may also be enhanced by adding gluten.

Gluten is also used in cosmetics, hair products and other dermatological preparations.

=== Animal feed ===
Wheat gluten is used both as a protein source and binding ingredient in pet foods. Wheat gluten imported from China adulterated with melamine used in pet foods was considered to have caused harm in many countries in 2007.

== Disorders ==
"Gluten-related disorders" is the umbrella term for all diseases triggered by gluten, which include celiac disease (CD), non-celiac gluten sensitivity (NCGS), wheat allergy, gluten ataxia and dermatitis herpetiformis (DH). Despite sharing a common trigger, these conditions represent clinical entities that require different diagnostic approaches and management strategies.

=== Pathophysiological research ===
The gluten peptides are responsible for triggering gluten-related disorders. In people who have celiac disease, the peptides trigger an immune response that causes injury of the intestines, ranging from inflammation to partial or total destruction of the intestinal villi. To study mechanisms of this damage, laboratory experiments are done in vitro and in vivo. Among the gluten peptides, gliadin has been studied extensively.

==== In vitro and in vivo studies ====
In the context of celiac disease, gliadin peptides are classified in basic and clinical research as immunogenic, depending on their mechanism of action:

- The peptides are those capable of directly affecting cells and intestinal preparations in vitro, producing cellular damage in vivo and eliciting the innate immune response. In vitro, the peptides promote cell apoptosis (a form of programmed cell death) and inhibit the synthesis of nucleic acids (DNA and RNA) and proteins, reducing the viability of cells. Experiments in vivo with normal mice showed that they cause an increase in cell death and the production of interferon type I (an inflammatory mediator). In vitro, gluten alters cellular morphology and motility, cytoskeleton organization, oxidative balance, and tight junctions.
- The immunogenic peptides are those able to activate T cells in vitro.

At least 50 epitopes of gluten may produce cytotoxic, immunomodulatory, and gut-permeating activities.

The effect of oat peptides (avenins) in celiac people depends on the oat cultivar consumed because of prolamin genes, protein amino acid sequences, and the immunotoxicity of prolamins which vary among oat varieties. In addition, oat products may be cross-contaminated with the other gluten-containing cereals.

=== Incidence ===
As of 2017, gluten-related disorders were increasing in frequency in different geographic areas. Some suggested explanations for this increase include the following: the growing westernization of diets, the increasing use of wheat-based foods included in the Mediterranean diet, the progressive replacement of rice by wheat in many countries in Asia, the Middle East, and North Africa, the higher content of gluten in bread and bakery products due to the reduction of dough fermentation time, and the development in recent years of new types of wheat with a higher amount of cytotoxic gluten peptides. However, a 2020 study that grew and analyzed 60 wheat cultivars from between 1891 and 2010 found no changes in albumin/globulin and gluten contents over time. "Overall, the harvest year had a more significant effect on protein composition than the cultivar. At the protein level, we found no evidence to support an increased immunostimulatory potential of modern winter wheat."

=== Celiac disease ===
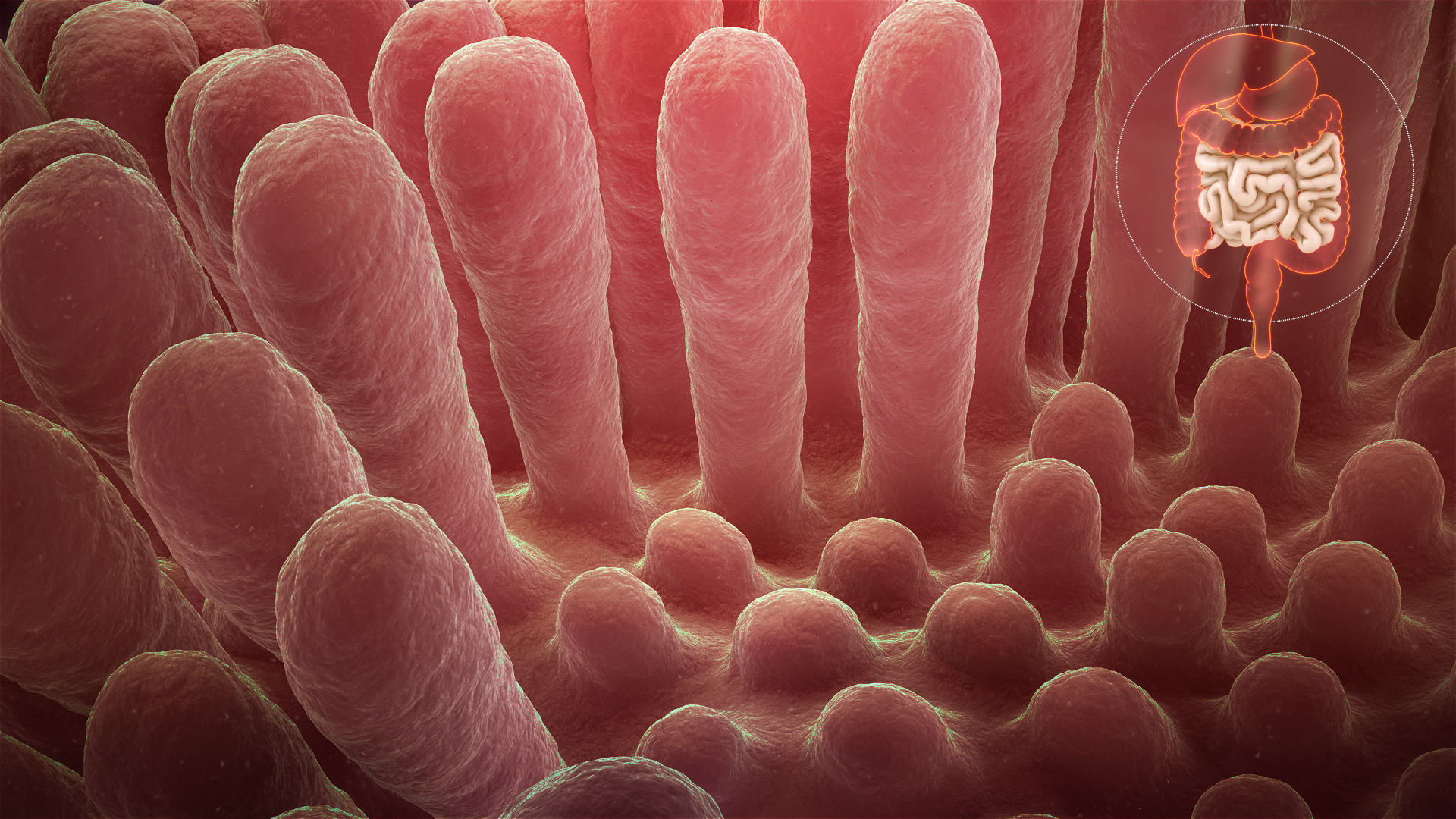
Medical animation still showing flattened intestinal villi in villous atrophy.

Celiac disease (CD) is a chronic, multiple-organ autoimmune disorder primarily affecting the small intestine caused by the ingestion of wheat, barley, rye, oats, and derivatives, that appears in genetically predisposed people of all ages. CD is not only a gastrointestinal disease, because it may involve several organs and cause an extensive variety of non-gastrointestinal symptoms, and most importantly, it may be apparently asymptomatic. Many asymptomatic people become accustomed to living with a chronic bad health status as if it were normal, but they are able to recognize that they actually had symptoms related to celiac disease after starting a gluten-free diet and improvement occurs. Added difficulties for diagnosis are the fact that serological markers (anti-tissue transglutaminase [TG2]) are not always present and many people may have minor mucosal lesions, without atrophy of the intestinal villi.

CD affects approximately 1–2% of the general population, but most cases remain unrecognized, undiagnosed and untreated, and at risk for serious long-term health complications. People may suffer severe disease symptoms and be subjected to extensive investigations for many years, before a proper diagnosis is achieved. Untreated CD may cause malabsorption, reduced quality of life, iron deficiency, osteoporosis, an increased risk of intestinal lymphomas, and greater mortality. CD is associated with some other autoimmune diseases, such as diabetes mellitus type 1, thyroiditis, gluten ataxia, psoriasis, vitiligo, autoimmune hepatitis, dermatitis herpetiformis, primary sclerosing cholangitis, and more.

CD with "classic symptoms", which include gastrointestinal manifestations such as chronic diarrhea and abdominal distention, malabsorption, loss of appetite, and impaired growth, is currently the least common presentation form of the disease and affects predominantly small children generally younger than two years of age.

CD with "non-classic symptoms" is the most common clinical type and occurs in older children (over two years old), adolescents, and adults. It is characterized by milder or even absent gastrointestinal symptoms and a wide spectrum of non-intestinal manifestations that can involve any organ of the body, and very frequently may be completely asymptomatic both in children (at least in 43% of the cases) and adults.

Asymptomatic CD (ACD) is present in the majority of affected patients and is characterized by the absence of classical gluten-intolerance signs, such as diarrhea, bloating, and abdominal pain. Nevertheless, these individuals very often develop diseases that can be related to gluten intake. Gluten can be degraded into several morphine-like substances, named gluten exorphins. These compounds have proven opioid effects and could mask the deleterious effects of gluten protein on gastrointestinal lining and function.

=== Non-celiac gluten sensitivity ===
Non-celiac gluten sensitivity (NCGS) is described as a condition of multiple symptoms that improves when switching to a gluten-free diet, after celiac disease and wheat allergy are excluded. Recognized since 2010, it is included among gluten-related disorders. Its pathogenesis is not yet well understood, but the activation of the innate immune system, the direct negative effects of gluten and probably other wheat components, are implicated.

NCGS is the most common syndrome of gluten intolerance, with a prevalence estimated to be 6-10%. NCGS is becoming a more common diagnosis, but its true prevalence is difficult to determine because many people self-diagnose and start a gluten-free diet, without having previously tested for celiac disease or having the dietary prescription from a physician. People with NCGS and gastrointestinal symptoms remain habitually in a "no man's land", without being recognized by the specialists and lacking the adequate medical care and treatment. Most of these people have a long history of health complaints and unsuccessful consultations with numerous physicians, trying to get a diagnosis of celiac disease, but they are only labeled as irritable bowel syndrome. A consistent although undefined number of people eliminate gluten because they identify it as responsible for their symptoms and these improve with the gluten-free diet, so they self-diagnose as NCGS.

People with NCGS may develop gastrointestinal symptoms, which resemble those of irritable bowel syndrome or wheat allergy, or a wide variety of non-gastrointestinal symptoms, such as headache, chronic fatigue, fibromyalgia, atopic diseases, allergies, neurological diseases, or psychiatric disorders, among others. The results of a 2017 study suggest that NCGS may be a chronic disorder, as is the case with celiac disease.

Besides gluten, additional components present in wheat, rye, barley, oats, and their derivatives, including other proteins called amylase-trypsin inhibitors (ATIs) and short-chain carbohydrates known as FODMAPs, may cause NCGS symptoms. As of 2019, reviews conclude that although FODMAPs present in wheat and related grains may play a role in non-celiac gluten sensitivity, they only explain certain gastrointestinal symptoms, such as bloating, but not the extra-digestive symptoms that people with non-celiac gluten sensitivity may develop, such as neurological disorders, fibromyalgia, psychological disturbances, and dermatitis. ATIs may cause toll-like receptor 4 (TLR4)-mediated intestinal inflammation in humans.

=== Wheat allergy ===
People can also experience adverse effects of wheat as result of a wheat allergy. As with most allergies, a wheat allergy causes the immune system to respond abnormally to a component of wheat that it treats as a threatening foreign body. This immune response is often time-limited and does not cause lasting harm to body tissues. Wheat allergy and celiac disease are different disorders. Gastrointestinal symptoms of wheat allergy are similar to those of celiac disease and non-celiac gluten sensitivity, but there is a different interval between exposure to wheat and onset of symptoms. An allergic reaction to wheat has a fast onset (from minutes to hours) after the consumption of food containing wheat and could include anaphylaxis.

=== Gluten ataxia ===
A male with gluten ataxia: previous situation and evolution after three months of gluten-free diet

Gluten ataxia is an autoimmune disease triggered by the ingestion of gluten. With gluten ataxia, damage takes place in the cerebellum, the balance center of the brain that controls coordination and complex movements like walking, speaking and swallowing, with loss of Purkinje cells. People with gluten ataxia usually present gait abnormality or incoordination and tremor of the upper limbs. Gaze-evoked nystagmus and other ocular signs of cerebellar dysfunction are common. Myoclonus, palatal tremor, and opsoclonus-myoclonus may also appear.

Early diagnosis and treatment with a gluten-free diet can improve ataxia and prevent its progression. The effectiveness of the treatment depends on the elapsed time from the onset of the ataxia until diagnosis, because the death of neurons in the cerebellum as a result of gluten exposure is irreversible.

Gluten ataxia accounts for 40% of cases diagnosed as idiopathic ataxia and 15% of all ataxias. Less than 10% of people with gluten ataxia present any gastrointestinal symptom, yet about 40% have intestinal damage.

=== Other neurological disorders ===
In addition to gluten ataxia, gluten sensitivity can cause a wide spectrum of neurological disorders, which develop with or without the presence of digestive symptoms or intestinal damage. These include peripheral neuropathy, epilepsy, headache, encephalopathy, vascular dementia, and various movement disorders (restless legs syndrome, chorea, parkinsonism, Tourette syndrome, palatal tremor, myoclonus, dystonia, opsoclonus myoclonus syndrome, paroxysms, dyskinesia, myorhythmia, myokymia).

The diagnosis of underlying gluten sensitivity is complicated and delayed when there are no digestive symptoms. People who do experience gastrointestinal problems are more likely to receive a correct diagnosis and treatment. A strict gluten-free diet is the first-line treatment, which should be started as soon as possible. It is effective in most of these disorders. When dementia has progressed to an advanced degree, the diet has no beneficial effect. Cortical myoclonus appears to be treatment-resistant on both gluten-free diet and immunosuppression.

== Labeling ==
People with gluten-related disorders need to eliminate gluten from their diets to varying degrees, necessitating label laws that enable them to determine suitability of foods. The term "gluten-free" is generally used to indicate a supposed harmless level of gluten rather than a complete absence.

For persons with celiac disease, consumption of more than 10 mg of gluten per day will cause intestinal architecture changes in the majority of celiacs. Based on this study by Catassi et al, many jurisdictions opt to use 20 parts per million as the regulatory threshold for a gluten-free claim, which enables someone to consume less than 10 mg of gluten when consuming 500 g of food. Those with celiac disease must avoid traces of gluten even if they do not experience overt acute symptoms from cross-contact. The ED05 for a discrete exposure in a wheat allergic person is 6.1 mg. Because those with wheat allergies may react to proteins other than gluten in wheat, some gluten-free products (e.g. gluten-free wheat starch) may be inappropriate for them.

There is no established threshold for those with NCGS, but some double blind feeding studies suggest no effect when 10 grams of gluten is consumed per day. Whether symptoms are alleviated due to gluten elimination or some other component in gluten grains is scientifically debated. Nevertheless, some jurisdictions like the EU and Australia have developed standards such as "very low gluten" and "low gluten" to accommodate those with NCGS who may be able to tolerate foods with higher levels of gluten in them.

=== International standards ===
The Codex Alimentarius international standards for food labeling has a standard relating to the labeling of products as "gluten-free". It only applies to foods that would normally contain gluten.

=== Australia and New Zealand ===
Gluten is defined to include wheat, barley, rye, and oats. If gluten is present as an intentional ingredient in a packaged product, these ingredients must be declared in the ingredient list. For a product to bear a gluten-free claim, it must not have any gluten ingredients and must also have no detectable gluten. Beers labelled gluten-free cannot contain barley ingredients irrespective of the level of quantitative gluten. A "low gluten" claim may be used where the product has less than 200 parts per million gluten.

Adjacent label claims like "gluten friendly" are not permitted. Precautionary advisory labels such as "may contain" and "made in a facility" are not permitted on products bearing a gluten-free claim.

=== Brazil ===
By law in Brazil, all food products must display labels clearly indicating whether or not they contain gluten.

=== Canada ===
Labels for packaged products sold in Canada must clearly identify the presence of gluten (wheat, barley, rye, oats, triticale) if these are present as an intentional ingredient in the food product. Foods labelled gluten-free must be free of gluten ingredients (wheat, barley, rye) and be below 20 parts per million gluten from cross-contact. Misleading claims such as "low gluten" or "reduced gluten" are not permitted.

In 2015, a market authorization was initiated by the Minister of Health, permitting the inclusion of uncontaminated oats (<20 parts per million) in gluten-free labelled items. Similar to the US law, foods with intentional gluten ingredients such as enzyme treated barley beer may not be labelled gluten-free even if they test below 20 parts per million gluten.

=== European Union and United Kingdom ===
All foods containing gluten as an intentional ingredient must be labelled accordingly as gluten is defined as one of the 14 recognised EU allergens. Foods, including non-packaged foods bearing a gluten-free claim must be below 20 parts per million, irrespective of ingredients. Foods may also be labelled "very low gluten," which is defined as 100 parts per million of gluten or less.

The EU/UK permits the use of gluten ingredients in products labelled gluten-free as long as the quantitative level of gluten is below 20 parts per million. The practical effect of this is that products containing fragmented gluten proteins such as soy sauce and barley based beer may be labelled gluten-free assuming they are below 20 parts per million gluten. This aspect of the regulation is controversial as the ELISA immunoassay cannot reliably detect fragments of gluten proteins, whereas there is evidence that those with celiac disease can react to these protein fragments. Other jurisdictions such as Canada and the United States have dealt with this controversy by prohibiting gluten protein fragment ingredients.

It is not permissible to label food as "gluten-free" when all similar food is naturally gluten-free, such as in the case of milk.

=== United States ===
In the United States, gluten grains other than wheat do not need to be declared when they are intentional ingredients in a food product. Packaged products bearing a claim of "gluten-free", "no gluten," "free of gluten," or "without gluten," cannot have gluten protein ingredients (wheat, barley, rye) and must be below 20 parts per million from cross-contact. Additionally, fermented or hydrolyzed foods (e.g. soy sauce, beer) cannot be labelled gluten-free unless the raw ingredients comply with the gluten-free label rule. In practice, this means that enzyme treated barley beers (as sold in Europe) may not be labelled gluten-free in the United States.

== See also ==
- Gliadin – Protein in wheat and other cereals
- Gluten-free diet – Diet excluding proteins found in wheat, barley, and rye
- Gluten exorphin – Group of opioid peptides
