= Glutenin =

Protein family

HMW Glutenin

Identifiers
- Symbol: Glutenin
- Pfam: PF03157
- InterPro: IPR001419
Available protein structures:
- Pfam: structures / ECOD
- PDB: RCSB PDB; PDBe; PDBj
- PDBsum: structure summary

Glutenin (a type of glutelin) is a major protein within wheat flour, making up 47% of the total protein content. The glutenins are protein aggregates of high-molecular-mass (HMW) and low-molecular-mass (LMW) subunits with molar masses from about 200,000 to a few million, which are stabilized by intermolecular disulfide bonds, hydrophobic interactions and other forces. Glutenin is responsible for the strength and elasticity of dough.

Wheat gluten proteins consist of two major fractions: the gliadins and the glutenins. Gliadins are monomeric proteins, which can be separated into four groups: alpha-, beta-, gamma- and omega-gliadins. They are structurally similar to LMW glutenins. Glutenins occur as multimeric aggregates of high-molecular-mass and low-molecular-mass subunits held together by disulfide bonds. The way the glutenins form their disulfide bond network is predicted to be regulated by the hydrophobicity in the peptide sections where their cysteins are located, explaining why the gliadins are monomeric despite sharing similar conserved cysteine motifs as the LMW-glutenins.

Breadmaking qualities are largely dependent on the number and composition of HMW glutenin subunits. It has been demonstrated that alleles Glu-A1b (Ax2∗) and Glu-D1d (Dx5 + Dy10) are normally associated with superior end-use quality, especially dough strength.
