= Gliadin =

Protein in wheat and other cereals

Gliadin/LMW glutenin

Identifiers
- Symbol: Glia_glutenin
- InterPro: IPR001954
Available protein structures:
- PDB: IPR001954
- AlphaFold: IPR001954

Gliadin [Seed storage proteins] N-terminal helical domain

Identifiers
- Symbol: Gliadin
- Pfam: PF13016
- InterPro: IPR016140
Available protein structures:
- PDB: IPR016140 PF13016 (ECOD; PDBsum)
- AlphaFold: IPR016140; PF13016

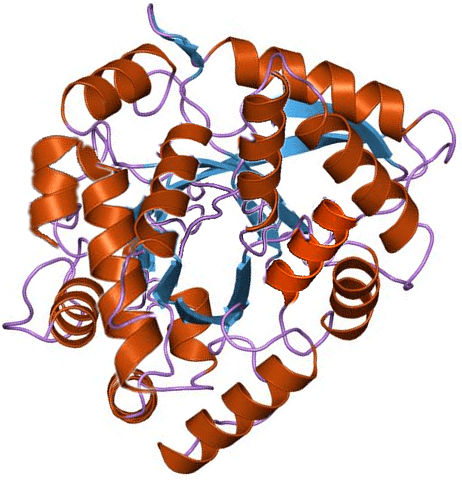
Gliadin

Gliadin (a type of prolamin) is a class of proteins present in wheat and several other cereals within the grass genera Triticum and Hordeum. Gliadins, which are a component of gluten, are essential for giving bread the ability to rise properly during baking. Gliadins and glutenins are the two main components of the gluten fraction of the wheat seed. This gluten is found in products such as wheat flour. Gluten is split about evenly between the gliadins and glutenins, although there are variations found in different sources.

Neither gliadins nor glutenins are water-soluble, but gliadins are soluble in 70% aqueous ethanol. There are three main types of gliadin (α, γ, and ω), to which the body is intolerant in coeliac (or celiac) disease. Diagnosis of this disease has recently been improving.

Gliadin can cross the intestinal epithelium. Breast milk of healthy human mothers who eat gluten-containing foods presents high levels of non-degraded gliadin.

== Types ==
The α, γ, and ω gliadin types are separated and distinguished based on their amino acid sequences in the N-terminal cysteine domain.

- α-gliadins (Alpha-gliadins) – soluble in low-percentage alcohols.
- β-gliadins (Beta-gliadins) - same as alpha.
- γ-gliadins (Gamma-gliadins) – ancestral form of cysteine-rich gliadin with only intrachain disulfide bridges
- ω-gliadins (Omega-gliadins) – soluble in higher percentages, 30–50% acidic acetonitrile.

== Chemistry ==
The gliadins are intrinsically disordered proteins meaning that they have continuously altering shapes making it difficult to study them. The performed image analysis and computer simulations of the proteins show that the average shape of the gliadins follows an elliptical shape. More specifically the protein likely has a tadpole-like structure with a hydrophobic core and a loose disordered tail. Compared to the other gluten proteins like the glutenins, which form extended networks of polymers due to disulphide bonds, gliadins are monomeric molecules in the cell, even if they in many ways are very similar. Especially the low molecular weight glutenins are similar in the way that they have cysteines located in matching locations as many of the gliadins. However, the gliadins are unable to form polymers in the cell since its cysteines form intra-chain disulphide bonds at synthesis due to hydrophobic interactions.

Gliadins are capable to aggregate into larger oligomers and interact with other gluten proteins, due to large hydrophobic sections, poly-Q and repetitive sequences. These sections are likely to aggregate hydrophobically, liquid-liquid phase separate, potentially form β-sheets aggregates or simply entangles by its structural properties.

== Biochemistry ==
Gliadins are prolamins and are separated on the basis of electrophoretic mobility and isoelectric focusing. Gliadin peptides cross the intestinal barrier by active transport.

== Metabolism ==
Gliadins are known for their role, along with glutenin, in the formation of gluten. They are slightly soluble in ethanol and contain only intramolecular disulfide links. They also cause some of the best examples of food-derived pathogenesis. People with celiac disease (also known as gluten-sensitive enteropathy) are sensitive to α, β, and γ gliadins. Those with wheat-dependent urticaria and baker's asthma are sensitive to ω-gliadins.

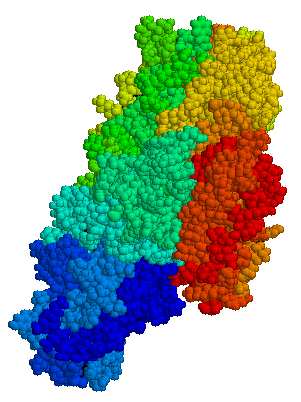
Tissue transglutaminase

Gliadin can also serve as a useful delivery method for sensitive enzymes (such as superoxide dismutase, which is fused with gliadin to form glisodin). This helps protect them from stomach acids that cause breakdown.

For useful description of the gliadins see:

- Triticeae glutens
- Immunochemistry of gluten

=== Deamidated gliadin ===
Deamidated gliadin is produced by acid or enzymatic treatment of gluten. The enzyme tissue transglutaminase converts some of the abundant glutamines to glutamic acid. This is done because gliadins are soluble in alcohol and cannot be mixed with other foods (like milk) without changing the food's qualities. Deamidated gliadin is soluble in water. The cellular immunity to deamidated α-/β-gliadin is much greater than α/β-gliadin and can result in symptomatic gluten-sensitive enteropathy.

== Celiac disease ==
Celiac disease (or coeliac disease) is a chronic, immune-mediated intestinal disorder, in which the body becomes intolerant to gliadin, which is a component of gluten. Individuals with celiac disease exhibit a lifelong intolerance of wheat, barley and rye – all of which contain prolamins. The main problem with this disease is that it often goes unrecognized for many years, in which case it can cause serious damage to several organs, and most cases currently remain unrecognized, undiagnosed and untreated.

Gliadin proteins have the ability to provoke an autoimmune enteropathy (intestinal disease) caused by an abnormal immune response in genetically susceptible individuals. Specific amino acid sequences within the gliadin proteins are responsible for this activity. It occurs as a result of CD4^{+} T cell recognition of deaminated gliadin polypeptide chains within the intestinal epithelium. CD8^{+} T cells then enter the epithelium and express NK receptors specific for gliadin and transglutaminase causing intraepithelial T cells to kill enterocytes by mediating apoptosis.

Celiac disease with "non-classic symptoms" is the most common clinical type and occurs in older children (over 2 years old), adolescents and adults. It is characterized by milder or even absent gastrointestinal symptoms and a wide spectrum of non-intestinal manifestations that can involve any organ of the body, and very frequently may be completely asymptomatic both in children (at least in 43% of the cases) and adults. Untreated celiac disease may cause malabsorption, reduced quality of life, iron deficiency, osteoporosis, an increased risk of intestinal lymphomas and greater mortality. It is associated with some autoimmune diseases, such as diabetes mellitus type 1, thyroiditis, gluten ataxia, psoriasis, vitiligo, autoimmune hepatitis, dermatitis herpetiformis, primary sclerosing cholangitis, and more.

The only available treatment for celiac disease is a strict gluten-free diet in which the affected person does not ingest any gluten-containing products. There have been searches for an affordable and much better treatment, but the only treatment remains to abstain from ingesting any gluten.

== See also ==
- Anti-gliadin antibodies
- Gluten immunochemistry
- Glutenin
- Non-celiac gluten sensitivity
- Gluten-related disorders
- Intestinal permeability
