= Gotschalk =

Gotschalk may refer to:

== People ==
- Friedrich Gotschalk (1786–1869), German-Danish businessman and Consul-General
- Felix C. Gotschalk, American psychologist

== Companies ==
- Fr. & E. Gotschalk, Danish company founded in 1820

== See also ==
- Gottschalk
- Gottschall
- Gottschalck
- Godchaux
- Godshall
