= Gotthold =

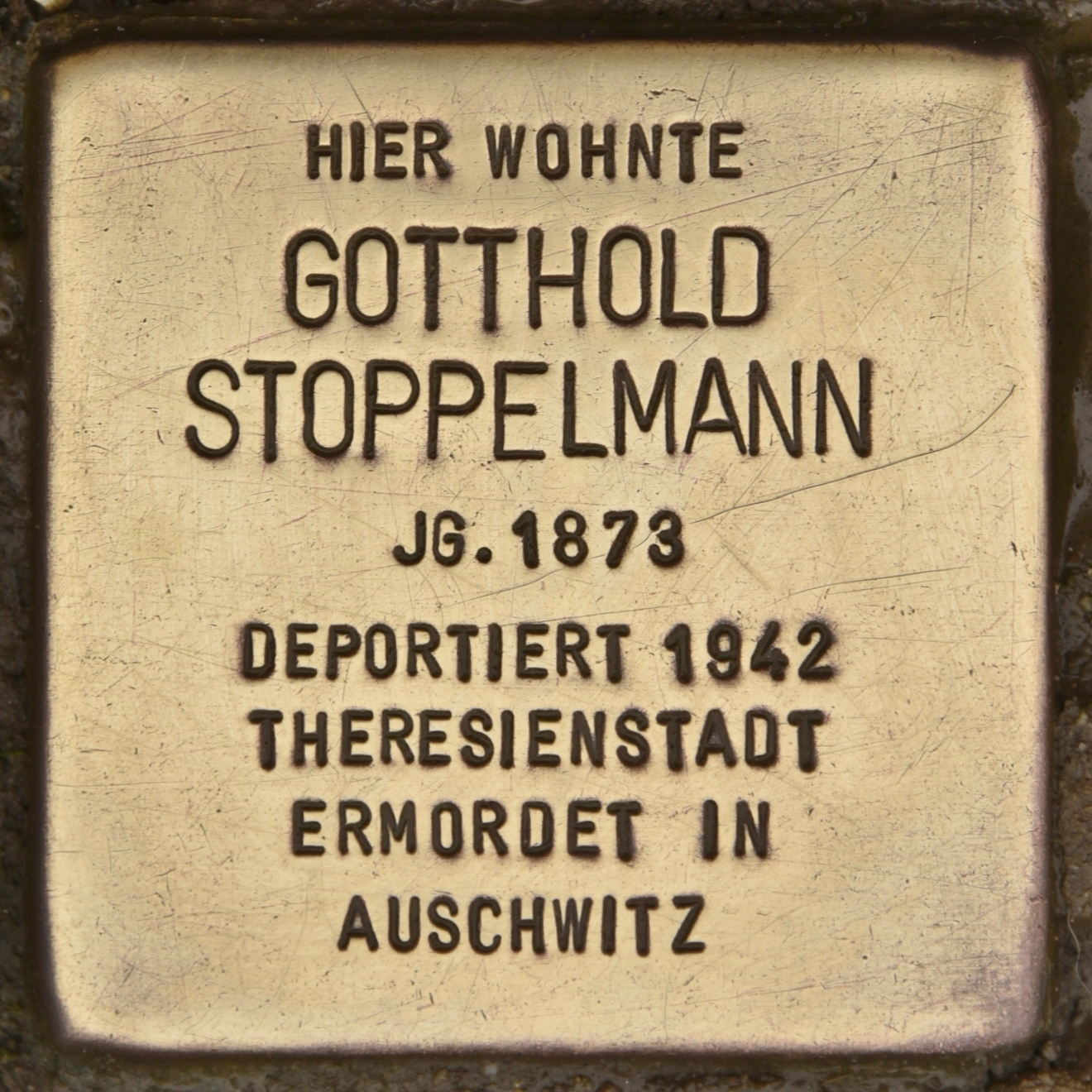
Stumbling stone for Gotthold Stoppelmann

Gotthold is a name of German origin. People with the name include:

== People with the given name ==
- Gotthold Eisenstein (1823–1852), German mathematician
- Gotthold Gloger (1924–2001), German writer and painter
- Samuel Gotthold Lange (1711-1781), German poet
- Gotthold Ephraim Lessing (1729—1781), German writer, philosopher, dramatist, publicist, and art critic
- Gotthold Salomon (1784-1862), German rabbi, politician and Bible translator.
- Gotthold Schwarz (born 1952), German bass-baritone singer and conductor

== People with the surname ==
- Helene Gotthold (1896–1944), a Jehovah's Witness executed by the Nazis

== See also ==
- Grube Gotthold, a former mine in eastern Germany
- Gottfried
- Gotthelf, Gotthilf
- Gottheil
- Gottlieb
- Gottschalk, Gottschall
- Gottwald
