= Pumpkin flour =

Flour made from pumpkins

Pumpkin flour, organic pumpkin flour
Nutritional value per 100 g (3.5 oz)
- Energy: 364 kJ (87 kcal)
- Carbohydrates: 71.43 g
- Sugars: 28.57 g
- Dietary fiber: 14.3 g
- Fat: 3.57 g
- Saturated: 1.43 g
- Protein: 14.29 g
Vitamins and minerals
Minerals	Quantity %DV^{†}
Calcium	8% 107 mg
Iron	25% 4.5 mg
Sodium	1% 25 mg
- ^{†}Percentages estimated using US recommendations for adults.

Pumpkin flour, also known as pumpkin fruit flour, is a type of flour made from dried pumpkin flesh, excluding the stem, and leaves, made with or without the rind and seeds included. Pumpkin products have drawn some commercial and research interest partly due to the low cost of pumpkin production. Additionally, pumpkin flour is a gluten-free flour which makes it suitable for people with coeliac disease, and it has been used in blends with other gluten-free flours to make baked goods. It has also been recognized as a potential additive to conventional wheat flour for producing composite flour with increased fiber, as well as being potentially useful as a natural form of food coloring for baked goods. Sun-dried pumpkin flour has a shelf life of about 11.5 months.
