= Godchaux =

Godchaux is a surname. Notable people with the surname include:

- Davon Godchaux (born 1994), American football player
- Donna Jean Godchaux (1947–2025), American singer
- Frank Godchaux Sr. (1879–1965), American businessman
- Frank Godchaux (1901–1978), American football and baseball player
- Keith Godchaux (1948–1980), American musician
- Leon Godchaux (1824–1899), American businessman, planter
- Patricia Godchaux, American politician

== See also ==
- Godshall
- Godchaux–Reserve Plantation
- Gottschalk
- Gottschall
