= Danielle Walker (writer) =

American writer

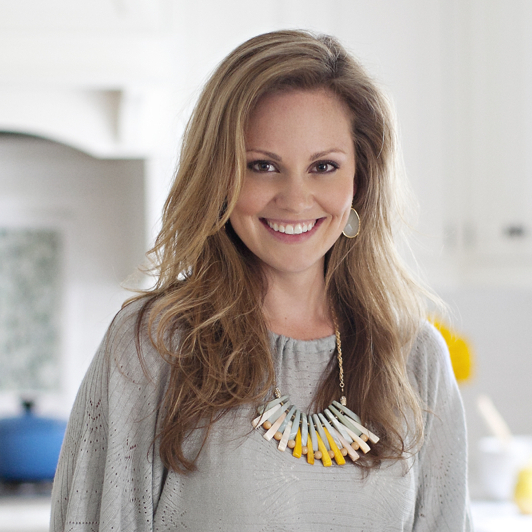
- Walker in 2012
- Born: Danielle Lynne Norsworthy; February 17, 1985 (age 41); Castro Valley, California, U.S.
- Occupations: Writer and editor
- Years active: 2011–present
- Known for: Writer of Against All Grain
- Spouse: Ryan Walker (2007–present)
- Children: Asher, Aila (deceased), Easton and Kezia
- Website: againstallgrain.com

Danielle Walker (born February 17, 1985) is an American writer, founder and editor of the gluten and grain-free food blog Against All Grain, and the best-selling cookbook of the same name.

== Career ==
Walker began experimenting with healthy cooking because she was suffering from the inflammatory bowel disease ulcerative colitis. She tried the specific carbohydrate diet but found that it did not totally relieve her symptoms. After some research, she tried the paleo diet and found that it helped her treat her condition. To disseminate her own recipes and other healthy diet information, Walker created Against All Grain, a blog covering specialty diets including Paleo, Gluten-free, and specific carbohydrate diet.

Walker also wrote and illustrated a best-selling specialty diet cookbook titled Against All Grain: Delectable Paleo Recipes to eat Well & Feel Great, which covers many of the recipes included on her blog, and new recipes. Against All Grain has been listed for 24 weeks as a New York Times best-selling book The book has been praised for Walker's photography. Walker was featured on Steven and Chris, a Canadian talk show on CBC Television, where she made spinach sausage lasagna.

== Bibliography ==
- Walker, Danielle (2013). Against All Grain: Delectable Paleo Recipes to Eat Well and Feel Great. Amazon: Victory Belt. ISBN 978-1936608362.
- Walker, Danielle (2014). Danielle Walker's Against All Grain: Meals Made Simple: Gluten-Free, Dairy-Free, and Paleo Recipes to Make Anytime. Amazon: Victor Belt. ISBN 978-1628600421.
- Walker, Danielle (2016). Danielle Walker's Against All Grain Celebrations: A Year of Gluten-Free, Dairy-Free, and Paleo Recipes for Every Occasion. Amazon: Ten Speed Press. ISBN 978-1607749424.
- Walker, Danielle (2018). Danielle Walker's Eat What You Love: Everyday Comfort Food You Crave; Gluten-Free, Dairy-Free, and Paleo Recipes. Amazon: Ten Speed Press. ISBN 978-1607749448.
