= Gottschalk =

Gottschalk or Godescalc (Old High German) is a male German name that can be translated literally as "servant of God". Latin forms include Godeschalcus and Godescalcus.

== Given name ==
- Godescalc of Benevento, 8th-century Lombard duke
- Godescalc (fl. 781–783), Carolingian scribe of the Godescalc Evangelistary
- Godescalc (bishop of Le Puy), 10th-century bishop, first documented pilgrim of the Via Podiensis
- Gottschalk of Orbais, a 9th-century theologian, poet, and unwilling monk, best known for his conflict with Hincmar
- Gottschalk of Aachen, 11th-century monk
- Gottschalk (Slavic prince), 11th-century Slavic Prince of the Wends (Saint Gottschalk)
- Gottschalk of Gembloux (fl. 1136), Benedictine historian and poet
- Godeschalc, a 12th-century Holstein peasant, protagonist of the Visio Godeschalci
- Gottschalk von Ahlefeldt (died 1541), last Catholic bishop of Schleswig

== Surname ==
- Alfred Gottschalk (biochemist) (1894–1973), German biochemist
- Alfred Gottschalk (rabbi) (1930–2009), German-born American rabbi
- Andreas Gottschalk (1815–1849), German communist
- Arthur R. Gottschalk (1925–2020), American politician from Illinois
- Ben Gottschalk (born 1992), American NFL football player
- Carl W. Gottschalk (1922–1997), American professor and kidney researcher
- Elisabeth Gottschalk (1912–1989), German-born Dutch historical geographer and professor
- Fred Gottschalk (1902–1965), American politician from Nebraska
- Heyno Gottschalk, († 1541), Lutheran monk, the last abbot in Oldenstadt
- Jacob C. Gottschalk (c. 1670–c. 1763), American Mennonite bishop
- Joachim Gottschalk (1904–1941), German actor
- John Gottschalk (1943–2024), American newspaper publisher
- Joseph Gottschalk (1950–2003), American cycling exhibitionist
- Kay Gottschalk (born 1965), German politician
- Louis Moreau Gottschalk (1829–1869), American composer and pianist
- Louis F. Gottschalk (1864–1934), American composer
- Louis A. Gottschalk (1916–2008), American psychiatrist
- Marie Gottschalk (born 1958), American political scientist
- Robert Gottschalk (1918–1982), American camera technician and founder of Panavision
- Timo Gottschalk (born 1974), German rally navigator
- Thomas Gottschalk (born 1950), German entertainer and actor
- Walter Gottschalk (1918–2004), American mathematician

== Other uses ==
- Gottschalks, a former retail chain in the United States
- Gottschalk v. Benson, a 1972 U.S. Supreme Court patent case

== See also ==
- Gotschalk
- Gottschall
- Gottschalck
- Godchaux
- Godshall
- Abdullah (name)
