= Sidney V. Haas =

American pediatrician

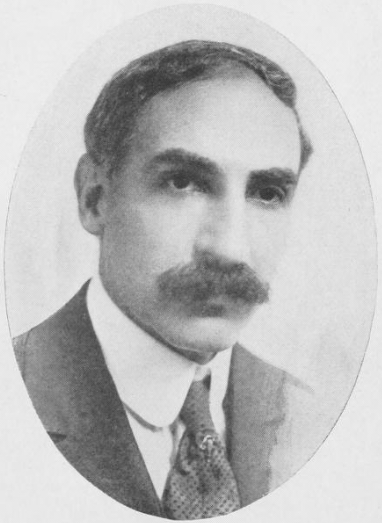
- Born: Sidney Valentine Haas; February 14, 1870; Chicago, Illinois, US
- Died: November 30, 1964 (aged 94); Orange, New Jersey, US
- Education: New York University Medical School; Columbia University College of Physicians and Surgeons
- Occupation: Pediatrician

Sidney Valentine Haas, M.D. (1870–1964) was a U.S. pediatrician whose research determined a dietary means of combating celiac disease.

== Biography ==
Haas was born in Chicago on February 14, 1870, and moved to New York City when he was six years old. He attended New York University Medical School and the Columbia University College of Physicians and Surgeons.

In 1924, Haas achieved notice when he published a medical paper detailing his use of a banana diet for the treatment of the eight children diagnosed with celiac disease. Haas incorrectly concluded that bananas enabled the breaking up of starches and the conversion of cane sugar into fruit sugar, which prevented the debilitating diarrhea of celiac disease. Haas' research led to the development of the Specific Carbohydrate Diet, a nutritional regimen that restricted the use of complex carbohydrates (disaccharides and polysaccharides) and eliminated refined sugar, gluten and starch from the diet. Haas never accepted the finding that gluten was the damaging part of wheat; he insisted it was starch and called the discovery about a gluten a "disservice".

During his career, Haas treated over 600 cases of celiac disease. In 1951, he joined his son, Dr. Merrill P. Haas, in publishing the medical textbook The Management of Celiac Disease.

He died at St. Mary's Hospital in Orange, New Jersey on November 30, 1964.
