= Godshall =

Godshall is a surname. Notable people with the surname include:

- Jeffrey I. Godshall author of "Wayward Wayfarer: The story of a Dodge".
- Ned A. Godshall who patented use of LiCoO_{2} as cathodes in lithium batteries
- Ron Godshall, CEO of Godshall's Quality Meats
- Robert Godshall, (1933-2019), American politician
- Rodney Godshall (1944–2025), American operatic bass

== See also ==
- Godchaux
- Gottschalk
- Gottschall
