= Godchaux–Reserve Plantation =

Historic site, former plantation

- U.S. National Register of Historic Places
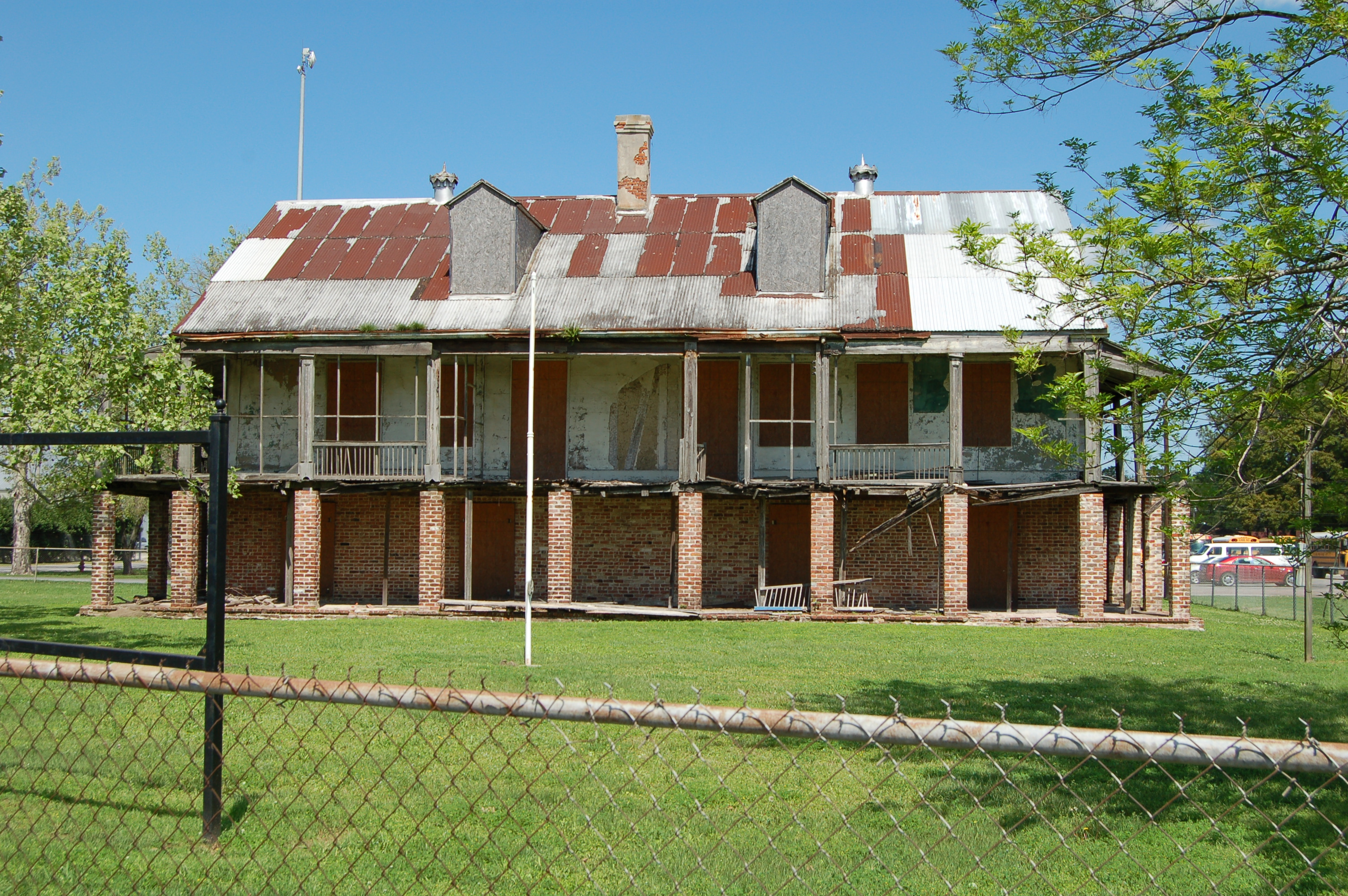
- Godchaux-Reserve Plantation House in 2012

- Location within Louisiana
- Location: 1628 Louisiana Highway 44, Reserve, Louisiana, U.S.
- Coordinates: 30.055278°N 90.563889°W
- Architectural style: French Creole and Federal
- NRHP reference No.: 93001548
- Added to NRHP: January 21, 1994

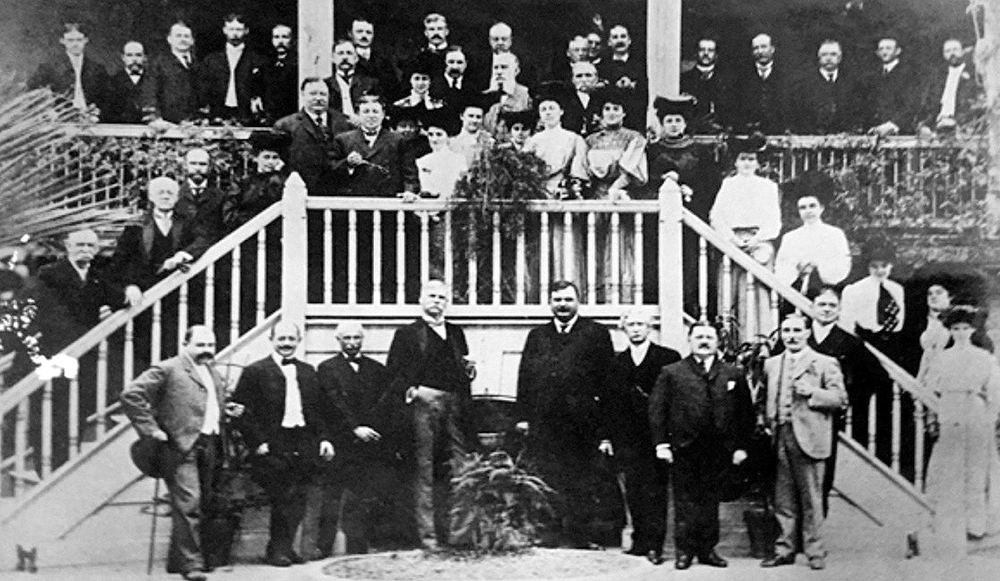
President William Howard Taft (1909) at the Godchaux–Reserve Plantation

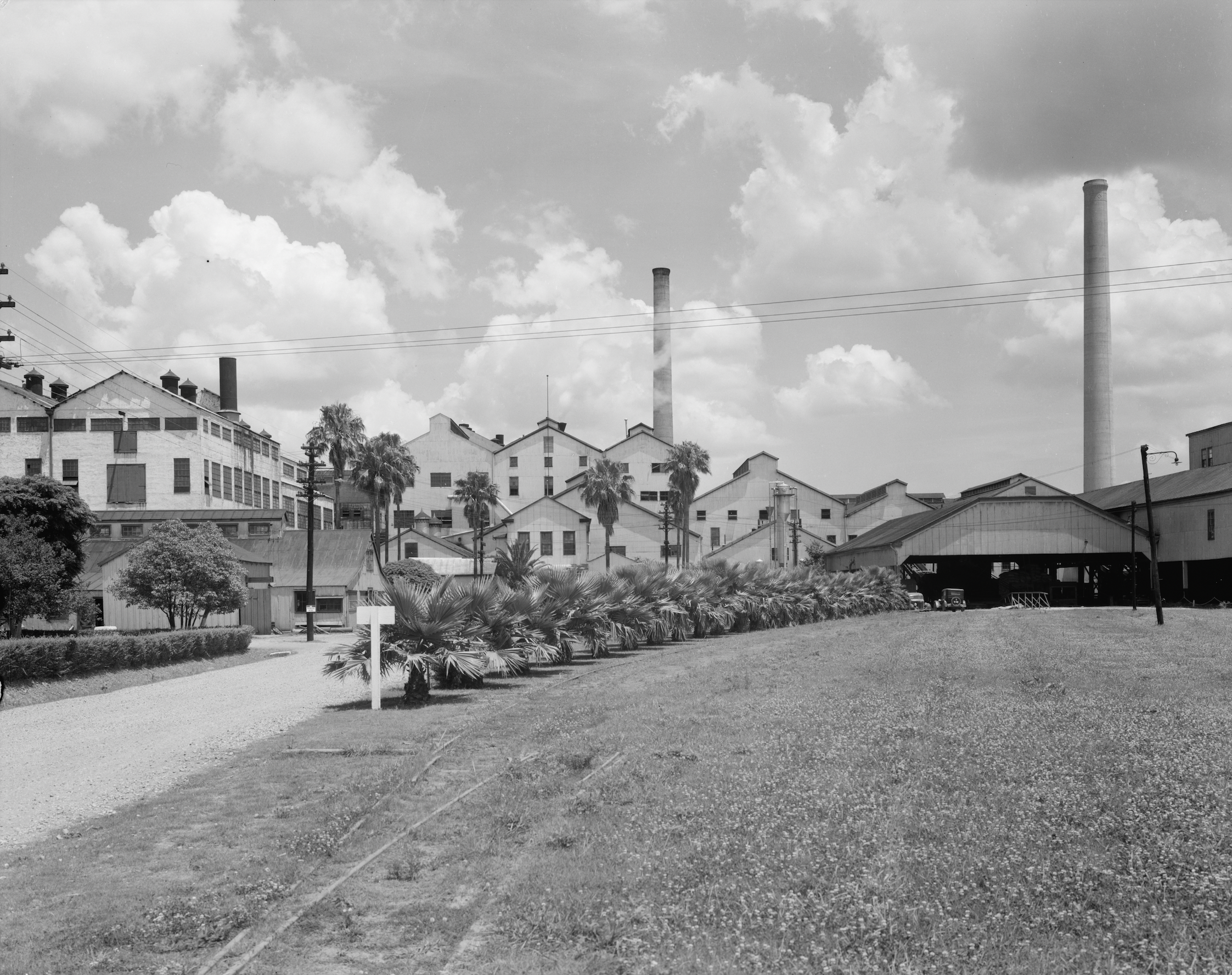
The Godchaux Sugar Refinery (1938)

Godchaux–Reserve Plantation, also known as Godchaux–Boudousquie Plantation, and the Reserve Plantation, is a former plantation, former site of a sugar refinery, and once included a historic house built in 1764, located in Reserve, St. John the Baptist Parish, Louisiana.

The house is listed as a National Register of Historic Places since January 21, 1994 for the architecture.

== History ==
=== House ===
The earliest portion of the house is thought to be built in 1764 by Jean Baptiste and Marie Therese Laubel. Between 1810 and 1833, it is thought that the main house was owned by unknown free people of color. From 1833 to 1855, the house was owned by Antoine Boudousquie and his wife, Sophie Andry Boudousquie, and followed by a purchase by Leon Godchaux in 1869.

In 1909, President William Howard Taft visited the Godchaux–Reserve House while touring Louisiana and he gave a speech at this location.

=== Sugar mill and refinery ===
By the late 1800s, Godchaux and his family turned the plantation and the sugar refinery into the largest sugar manufacturers in the United States and one of the largest globally. Godchaux had owned network of 12 sugar plantations, all located across southeast Louisiana that fed into the Godchaux Sugar Refinery. For many years the Reserve plantation property held the Godchaux Sugar Refinery which was active from 1917 to 1985; and the company had once offered public tours.

== House architecture ==
The Godchaux–Reserve Plantation house is a colombage (or timber framed) raised building, designed in the French Creole and Federal architecture styles. The core structure of the house is thought to be built in 1764 by Jean Baptiste and Marie Therese Laubel and was simply a two wooden rooms with a fireplace.

The house has had four major periods of construction and has been moved at least two times. Sometime prior to 1900, the house was moved to the Godchaux Sugar Mill. On September 25, 1993, the house was moved from the former Reserve Plantation (less than one mile distance) to its location on 1628-Louisiana Highway 44 (also known as Great River Road).

Four Federal architecture-style wraparound fireplace mantels featuring intricate designs and motifs were added to the home in circa. 1825 during a renovation; however, it is unclear how much of the house was renovated during this time. A renovation circa. 1850 on the house added new flooring, new moldings, new roof columns, and a new roofline. The walls of the building are a combination of brick and bousillage between the wooden posts.

By the early 1990s, the building was in disrepair. In 2013, the Godchaux-Reserve House Historical Society (GRHHS) was formed in order to restore the house. The long-term goal of the GRHHS was to restore the building into a museum open to the public.

== Publications ==
- The Story of Godchaux's Pure Cane Sugar (1 ed.). New Orleans, LA: Godchaux Sugars, Inc. 1933. OCLC 4233358.
- Famous Recipes From Old New Orleans: Collected for You by the Makers of Godchaux's Sugars (5 ed.). New Orleans, LA: Godchaux Sugars, Inc. 1955. OCLC 1031406758.

== See also ==
- Landmark Land Company
- Cinclare Sugar Mill Historic District
- Laurel Valley Sugar Plantation
- List of plantations in Louisiana
- National Register of Historic Places listings in St. John the Baptist Parish, Louisiana
