= Leon Godchaux =

American planter and businessman (1824–1899)

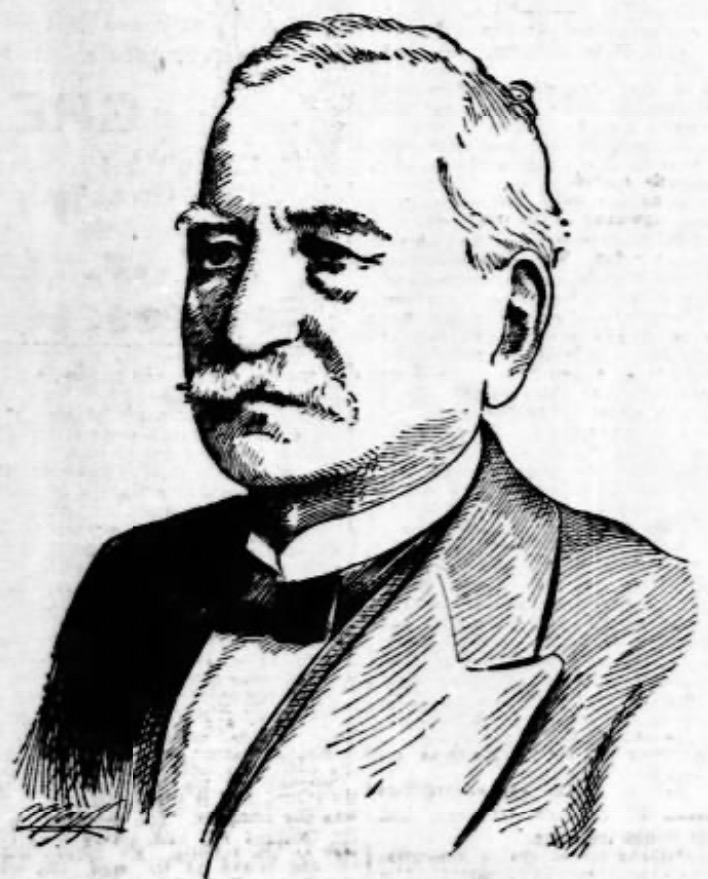
- Born: June 10, 1824; Alsace-Lorraine, France
- Died: May 18, 1899 (aged 74)
- Occupations: Planter, businessman

Leon Godchaux (June 10, 1824 – May 18, 1899) was a French-born American businessman, planter, sugar plantation owner and the founder of the Leon Godchaux Clothing Co. department store and Godchaux Sugars Inc.. He lived in Louisiana, where the "largest sugar plantations" were "the Calumet, and those owned by Leon Godchaux, 'The Sugar King of the South.'"

== Biography ==
Godchaux was born on June 10, 1824, in Alsace–Lorraine, to a Jewish family in Herbéviller region of Lorraine France. He immigrated to the United States in 1837.

In 1845, Godchaux founded the Leon Godchaux Clothing Co., a department store that anchored Canal Street in New Orleans for years to come. He then purchased the town of Bonnet Carre in St. John the Baptist Parish and changed its name to Reserve. The town of Reserve went on to become the home of the largest sugar refinery in the United States, fed by his twelve sugar cane plantations across southeast Louisiana. Godchaux–Reserve Plantation was one of his twelve plantations, located in Reserve, Louisiana and is listed on the National Register of Historic Places (NRHP).

Godchaux achieved business success in his home state; according to the Hawaiinan Planter's Monthly, with "a first class crop and many outside offerings, there is no doubt that Raceland refinery will beat the record this season, thus placing Leon Godchaux at the head of the list of sugar producers of this State and give to him the title" 'the Sugar King of Louisiana.' He died on May 18, 1899, aged 74. By the time of his death, he owned 30,000 acres of sugar cane fields which annually produced 27 million pounds of refined white sugar. He was a multimillionaire due to the profits from his sugar empire and his department store in New Orleans."

In 1975, he was honored on a Mardi Gras doubloon as a "great man of Louisiana."

== See also ==
- Jews in the Southern United States
