= Michael Newton Marsh =

British academic (1937–2021)

Professor Michael Newton Marsh, DM, DSc, DPhil, FRCP (15 May 1937 – 12 July 2021) was a reader of medicine at Magdalen College, Oxford, and became an academic biomedical research physician in Manchester, known for his expertise on coeliac disease.

== Career ==
In 2006, Marsh received a Distinguished Investigator Award for his work on gluten intolerance (coeliac disease), and his classification of intestinal responses, which are now internationally adopted. Marsh received two lifetime achievement awards.

While approaching retirement, Marsh received an Oxford degree in theology, subsequently returning to Magdalen to write a D.Phil. thesis on neurophysiological and theological approaches to near-death and out-of-body experiential phenomenology. In later life, he was at Wolfson College and, in addition, a Fellow of the Oxford Centre for Christianity and Culture at Regent's Park College, University of Oxford.
