= Gotthilf =

Gotthilf is a male given name. Notable people with this name include:

- Gotthilf Christoph Wilhelm Busolt (1771–1831), German scholar
- Gotthilf Fischer (1928–2020), German choir and orchestra director
- Gotthilf Hagen (1797–1884), German physicist
- Arnold Ludwig Gotthilf Heller (1840–1913), German anatomist and pathologist
- Gotthilf Hempel (born 1929), German marine biologist
- Gotthilf August von Maltitz (1794–1837), German writer
- Gotthilf Ludwig Möckel (1838–1915), German architect
- Daniel Gotthilf Moldenhawer (1753–1823), Danish academic
- Gotthilf Heinrich Ernst Muhlenberg (1753–1815), American botanist and clergyman
- Friedrich Gotthilf Osann (1794–1858), German philologist
- Christian Gotthilf Salzmann (1744–1811), German academic
- Gotthilf Heinrich von Schubert (1780–1860), German scientist
- Gotthilf Weisstein (1852–1907), German journalist
- Johann Gotthilf Ziegler (1688–1747), German composer
