= Gottschalck =

Gottschalck is a surname. Notable people with the surname include:

- Camilla Gottschalck (born 1977), Danish composer, singer, musician, and actress
- Ulrike Gottschalck (born 1955), German politician

== See also ==
- Gottschalk
