= Joseph Gottschalk =

Joseph H. Gottschalk
- Born: 16 December 1950
- Died: 21 June 2003 (aged 52); Big Bend National Park, Texas
- Occupation: Unemployed at death
- Known for: Minimalist cycling attire

Joseph H. Gottschalk (December 16, 1950 – June 21, 2003) was a resident of San Antonio, Texas who gained international notoriety in 2003 through his preference for riding his bicycle clad only in a thong. After numerous interviews, a parade, and at least one arrest, his life ended in suicide at Big Bend National Park.

== Early years ==
Before his riding habits made him an "odd news of the day" item, Joseph Gottschalk—his surname means "God's servant"—led an unremarkable life. He grew up in Dallas, Texas, one of six children. In 1969 at the age of 18 he attended Catholic seminary at Pontifical College Josephinum in Columbus, Ohio, but dropped out after one semester. Described as "nerdy, even by seminary standards," Gottschalk was soon drafted into the Vietnam War effort. According to his brother Paul, Gottschalk spent most of his short Army career behind bars refusing to do "anything to help the war efforts."

He married in 1976 and divorced in 2000, having fathered four children.

== Thong Man ==
Citing an appreciation for personal liberty and the human form, Gottschalk began riding his bicycle clad only in a thong in April or May 2003. At first he restricted his rides to his south side San Antonio neighborhood, particularly Southside Lions Park, but later expanded his routes north into the downtown area. The San Antonio Express-News newspaper published a story on him in their May 5, 2003 metro section that was picked up by the Associated Press and quickly went viral bringing him fame far beyond his own city's limits.

Locally, Thong Man, as Gottschalk came to be known, provoked both admiration and disgust. Gottschalk seemed to enjoy pushing the boundaries of public taste, and compared his riding wardrobe preferences to driving the maximum legal speed limit. In response to being labeled a pervert, he decried judgment that "(based) morality on appearance." In time, he gained a kind of cult hero status among a minority of San Antonians, enough so that on May 23, 2003, he was fêted as grand marshal of a parade sponsored by a local radio station.

== Arrest ==
On June 17, 2003, Gottschalk was arrested for indecent exposure. According to the police report, Gottschalk had forsaken his usual cycling attire for a "tan bag" which left his anus exposed when he stood up on his bicycle. He was released the following day on 100 dollars bond vowing to fight his Class B misdemeanor offense. It was a question of legality destined to remain unresolved.

== Death ==
On June 21, 2003, a group of hikers in Big Bend National Park discovered Gottschalk's naked remains at the bottom of a 100-foot drop along the South Rim Loop trail. The San Antonio Express-News editorial page mourned the loss, stating: "Thong Man will be remembered as one of the many colorful, off-beat characters of Alamo City lore." Brewster County Justice of the Peace Shirley Williams declared his death a suicide after a month-long investigation.
