= Gotthelf =

Gotthelf is a given name and a surname. Notable people with the name include:

Given name:

- Gotthelf Bergsträsser (1886–1933), German linguist specializing in Semitic studies
- Esriel Gotthelf Carlebach (1909–1956), journalist during the early days of the state of Israel
- Carl Gotthelf Gerlach (1704–1761), German organist, took over the Leipzig Collegium Musicum from J S Bach
- Ernst Gotthelf Gersdorf (1804–1874), German librarian, most notable for his work at the Leipzig University Library
- Gotthelf Greiner (1732–1797), German glassmaker
- Ferdinand Gotthelf Hand (1786–1851), German classical scholar
- Karl Gotthelf von Hund (1722–1776), German freemason
- Abraham Gotthelf Kästner (1719–1800), German mathematician and epigrammatist
- Julius Gotthelf Kühn or Julius Kühn (1825–1910), German academic and agronomist
- Karl Gotthelf Lehmann (1812–1863), German physiological chemist
- Johann Gotthelf Lindner (1729–1776), German university teacher and writer
- Wilhelm Gotthelf Lohrmann (1796–1840), Saxon cartographer, astronomer, meteorologist and patron of the sciences
- Ernst Gustav Gotthelf Marcus (1893–1968), German zoologist at University of São Paulo
- Burkhard Gotthelf Struve (1671–1738), scholarly German librarian at the University of Jena
- Gotthelf Fischer von Waldheim (1771–1853), German and Russian anatomist, entomologist and paleontologist

Surname:

- Allan Gotthelf (1942–2013), American philosopher and scholar
- Jeremias Gotthelf (1797–1854), pen name of Swiss novelist Albert Bitzius
- Michael Gotthelf (born 1953), German journalist and banker
