= Coeliac disease =

Autoimmune disorder

- Other names: Coeliac sprue, nontropical sprue, endemic sprue, gluten enteropathy
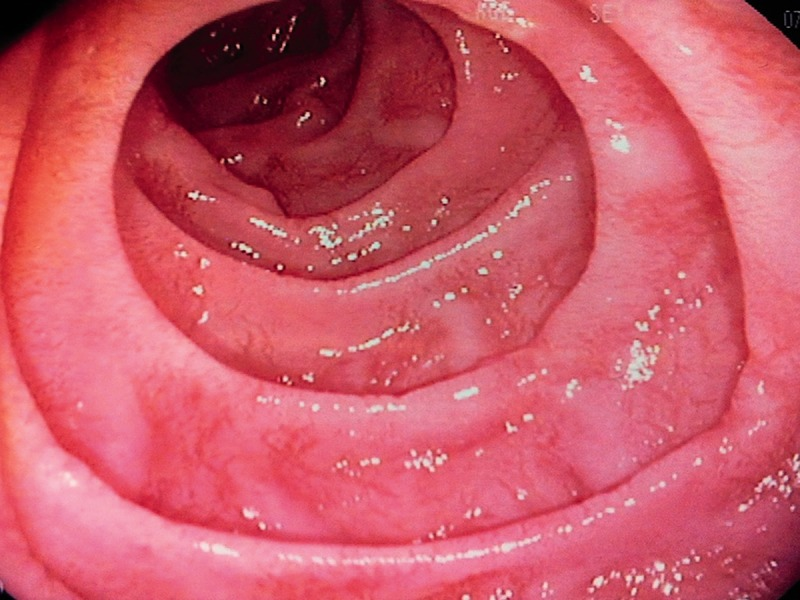
- Endoscopy of the duodenum showing fissured folds with a scalloped appearance
- Pronunciation: /ˈsiːliæk/ SEE-lee-ak
- Specialty: Gastroenterology, internal medicine
- Symptoms: None or non-specific, diarrhoea, malabsorption, weight loss
- Complications: Iron-deficiency anaemia, osteoporosis, infertility, cancers, nutritional deficiencies
- Usual onset: Any age
- Duration: Lifelong
- Causes: Gluten
- Risk factors: Genetic predisposition and environmental factors
- Diagnostic method: Blood tests and intestinal biopsies
- Differential diagnosis: Inflammatory bowel disease, intestinal parasites, irritable bowel syndrome
- Treatment: Gluten-free diet
- Frequency: Between 1 in 50 and 1 in 200

Coeliac disease (British English) or celiac disease (American English) is a chronic autoimmune disease, mainly affecting the small intestine. It is caused by an abnormal immune system response to gluten, a protein found in wheat and other grains such as barley and rye. Coeliac disease causes a wide range of symptoms and complications that can affect multiple organs outside the gastrointestinal tract.

The classic form of the disease can affect any age group, but is usually diagnosed in early childhood and causes symptoms of malabsorption such as weight loss, diarrhoea, and stunted growth. Non-classic coeliac disease is more commonly seen in adults, characterised by vague abdominal symptoms and complications in organs outside the gastrointestinal tract, such as bone disease, anaemia, and other consequences of nutritional deficiencies. In people with a genetic predisposition to the condition, eating gluten causes inflammation in the small intestine, damaging its lining and leading to malabsorption. The development of coeliac disease is believed to be influenced by other environmental factors, such as infections.

Diagnosis is based on symptoms, blood tests, and biopsies of the small intestine. For people who have already cut gluten from their diet, gluten may need to be reintroduced before testing to ensure an accurate diagnosis. A lack of awareness and the diverse symptoms, which overlap with other disorders, often complicate the diagnosis by leading to a delay in diagnosis. Current research indicates that there is not enough evidence to advocate for mass screening for coeliac disease in those without symptoms.

The only treatment for coeliac disease is a lifelong gluten-free diet (GFD). A GFD involves removing all food and drink containing wheat, rye, barley, and gluten derivatives. Symptoms can improve within days of adopting a GFD, and the diet can improve quality of life, prevent further complications, and normalise some effects of the disease such as stunted growth.

Approximately 1 in 200 to 1 in 50 people have coeliac disease. Diagnoses of coeliac disease have increased recently due to increased awareness and availability of blood testing. The disease is still thought to be underdiagnosed, with a significant number of people with the condition remaining undiagnosed and untreated. The disease usually develops before age 10; it is slightly more common in women than in men.

== Terminology and classification ==
"Coeliac disease" is the preferred spelling in British English, whereas "celiac disease" is typically used in North American English. The terms sprue, coeliac sprue, gluten-sensitive enteropathy, non-tropical sprue and idiopathic steatorrhoea have been used as synonyms for coeliac disease in the past. Both gluten intolerance and gluten sensitivity have been used as synonyms of coeliac disease or to describe other symptoms triggered by gluten. The terms are nonspecific and lack a consistent definition. Gluten-related disorders are conditions related to gluten such as coeliac disease, gluten ataxia, wheat allergy, dermatitis herpetiformis, and non-coeliac gluten sensitivity.

Many individuals with coeliac disease are asymptomatic, meaning they do not have any symptoms associated with coeliac disease. Those with asymptomatic coeliac disease are commonly diagnosed through screening programs. The term "silent coeliac disease" is equivalent to asymptomatic, but usage is discouraged. Coeliac disease can be symptomatic (previously called overt coeliac disease) or subclinical. Subclinical coeliac disease has historically had many different definitions, such as those with symptoms mainly outside the gastrointestinal tract, or those with clinical signs of the disease (anaemia, laboratory abnormalities, and endoscopic features) but no symptoms. Subclinical coeliac disease is now used when individuals who do not have symptoms that commonly warrant testing for coeliac disease have positive serology for coeliac disease. Symptomatic coeliac disease (characterised by symptoms related to gluten) can be further categorised into classical and non-classical. Classical coeliac disease, which in the past has also been called typical coeliac disease, is coeliac disease presenting with malnutrition, malabsorption, and diarrhoea. Non-classical coeliac disease, historically referred to as atypical coeliac disease, is when individuals primarily present with symptoms unrelated to malabsorption.

Potential coeliac disease refers to those who have positive serology for coeliac disease but no changes in the small intestine. The term latent coeliac disease has been used interchangeably with potential coeliac disease, but has no consistent definition, and its use is therefore discouraged.

Sometimes, those with coeliac disease will continue to experience symptoms or signs of the disease despite being on a gluten-free diet. "Slow responders" or "non responsive coeliac disease" (NRCD) is the persistence of symptoms despite exclusion of gluten for 6 to 12 months. Refractory coeliac disease (RCD) is the persistence of malabsorption and damage to the small intestine after at least 12 months of a gluten-free diet. Most people with NRCD do not have RCD; instead, their symptoms are caused by some other factor. There are two types of RCD: type one has histopathological changes similar to those seen in untreated coeliac disease, whereas type two has abnormal histopathological changes not consistent with untreated coeliac disease.

== Signs and symptoms ==
Coeliac disease causes a wide range of symptoms and complications that can involve several different organs. The presentation of coeliac disease can be classified as classic, non-classic, and subclinical. Classic coeliac disease is commonly seen in young children, but can affect any age group, and is characterised by malabsorption manifesting as diarrhoea, weight loss, and failure to thrive. Non-classic coeliac disease is seen more often in adults, and symptoms primarily manifest outside the intestine (extraintestinal). Many undiagnosed individuals who consider themselves asymptomatic are, in fact, not, but rather have become accustomed to living in a state of chronically compromised health. After starting a gluten-free diet and a subsequent improvement becomes evident, such individuals are often able to retrospectively recall and recognise prior symptoms of their untreated disease that they had mistakenly ignored.

=== Gastrointestinal ===
Diarrhoea that is characteristic of coeliac disease is chronic, sometimes pale, of large volume, and abnormally foul in odour. Other symptoms of coeliac disease include abdominal pain, cramping, bloating with abdominal distension, and mouth ulcers. As the bowels become more damaged, lactose intolerance can develop.

=== Extraintestinal manifestations ===
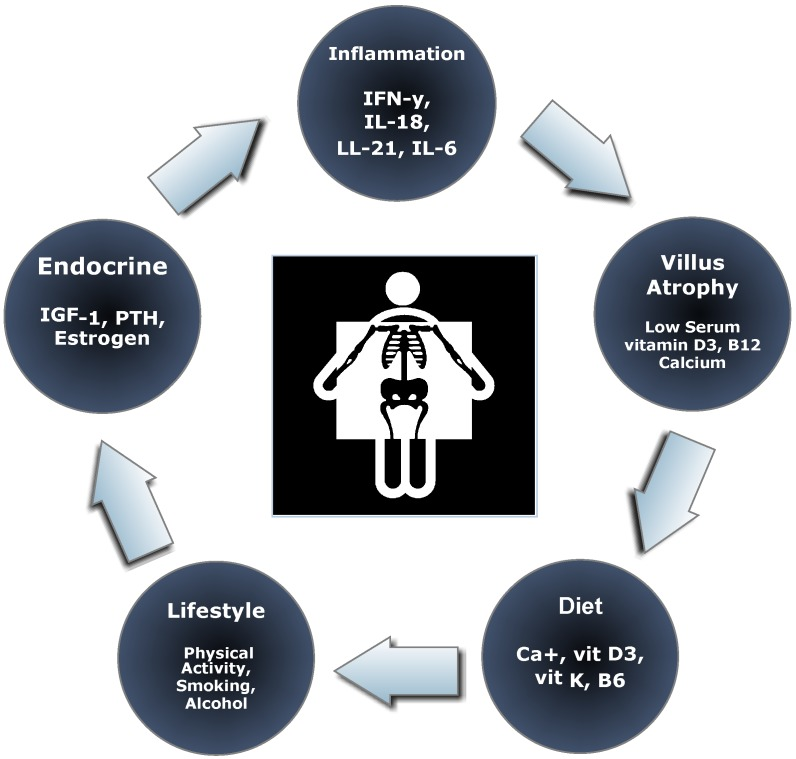
Dysfunctional bone metabolism in coeliac disease

Coeliac disease is a systemic disorder, meaning it affects the entire body. Although many common symptoms of the disease are related to the gastrointestinal tract, those with coeliac disease may also experience symptoms and complications in other organs, known as extraintestinal manifestations. These manifestations may be related to malabsorption or systemic inflammation. Common extraintestinal manifestations of coeliac disease include headaches, fatigue, brain fog, muscle pain, and joint pain.

Nutritional status in coeliac disease may be compromised due to lower intake, maldigestion, and malabsorption, leading to nutritional deficiencies. Common deficiencies in coeliac disease include iron, folate, zinc, vitamin D, and vitamin B_{12}. Vitamin D deficiency can cause secondary hyperparathyroidism. Hyperoxaluria and kidney stones can be caused by malabsorption of fats, and peptides. Iron deficiency may lead to anaemia, which is one of the most common extraintestinal presentations of coeliac disease. Coeliac disease also often affects the bones, causing low bone mass density (osteopenia) and osteoporosis. Causes of bone changes in coeliac disease are believed to be caused by malabsorption, inflammation, and autoimmunity.

If left untreated, coeliac disease can affect hormones, causing delayed periods or puberty and reproductive disorders. Coeliac disease is associated with infertility and complications during pregnancy such as intra-uterine growth restriction and spontaneous abortion. Reproductive disorders are thought to be caused by nutritional deficiencies, particularly zinc, iron, folate, and selenium deficiencies in coeliac disease.

Coeliac disease often affects the liver, causing increased transaminase levels. This elevation of transaminases seen in coeliac disease is known as coeliac hepatitis. Mildly increased transaminases without symptoms and without other possible factors such as autoimmune or viruses that could cause liver abnormalities, characterise coeliac hepatitis.

In patients with persistent symptoms despite treatments for coeliac disease, IgE-mediated allergic diseases, including food allergy, allergic rhinitis, and asthma, should be considered in the differential diagnosis, as they may coexist with celiac disease.

Due to the systemic nature of coeliac disease and its potential to affect any organ, there are many rarer presentations of coeliac disease, some of which have an unclear relationship to the disease. Some of these more uncommon manifestations include peripheral neuropathy, epilepsy, psoriasis, recurrent aphthous stomatitis, pericardial effusion, and Lane-Hamilton syndrome.

== Causes ==
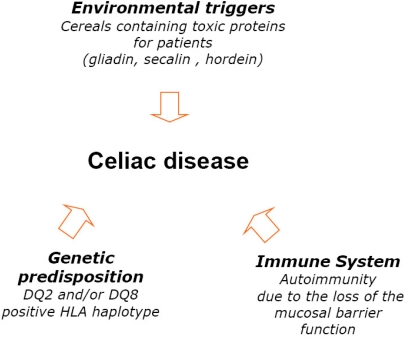
Factors involved in the pathogenesis of coeliac disease

Coeliac disease is caused by an inflammatory reaction to gliadins and glutenins (gluten proteins) found in wheat and to similar proteins found in the crops of the tribe Triticeae (which includes other common grains such as barley and rye) and to the tribe Aveneae (oats). Wheat subspecies (such as spelt, durum, and khorasan wheat) and wheat hybrids (such as triticale) also cause symptoms of coeliac disease.

A small number of people with coeliac disease react to oats. Sensitivity to oats in coeliac disease may be due to cross-contamination of oats and other foods with gluten, differences between gluten content, immunoreactivity, and genetic variability seen between oat cultivars or dietary intolerance to oats. Most people with coeliac disease do not have adverse reactions to uncontaminated or "pure" oats, however clinical guidelines differ on whether those with coeliac disease should consume oats.

Other cereals such as maize, millet, sorghum, teff, rice, and wild rice are safe for people with coeliac disease to consume, as well as non-cereals such as amaranth, quinoa, and buckwheat. Noncereal carbohydrate-rich foods such as potatoes and bananas do not contain gluten and do not trigger symptoms.

=== Risk modifiers ===
Environmental factors such as infections, geographic latitude, birth weight, antibiotic use, intestinal microbiota, socioeconomic status, hygiene, breastfeeding, and the timing of introduction of gluten into an infant's diet are theorised to contribute to the development of coeliac disease in genetically predisposed individuals. The consumption of gluten and timing of introduction, in a baby's life does not appear to increase the risk of coeliac disease, however in those who are genetically predisposed to coeliac disease, large amounts of gluten early in life may increase the risk of developing coeliac disease.

== Mechanism ==
Coeliac disease appears to be multifactorial, both in that more than one genetic factor can cause the disease, and in that more than one factor is necessary for the disease to manifest in a person.

Almost all people with coeliac disease have either the HLA-DQ2 variant (allele) or, less commonly, the HLA-DQ8 allele. However, about 40% of people without coeliac disease have also inherited either of these alleles. This suggests that additional factors are needed for coeliac disease to develop; that is, the predisposing HLA risk allele is necessary but not sufficient to develop coeliac disease. Furthermore, a small percentage of those who do develop coeliac disease do not have typical HLA-DQ2 or HLA-DQ8 alleles.

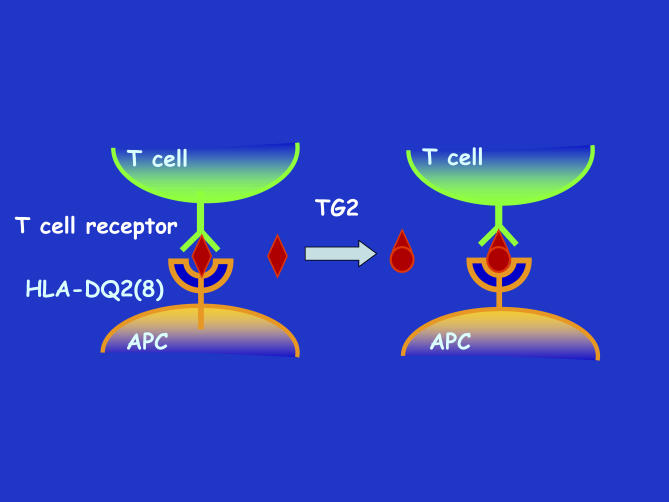
Antigen-presenting cells bind peptides and "present" them to T cells, which detect HLA–peptide complexes through T-cell receptors. In coeliac disease, T cells respond to gluten peptides bound to HLA-DQ2 or HLA-DQ8. Gluten-derived peptides (red diamond) bind only with low affinity to HLA-DQ2 and HLA-DQ8, but TG2 can modify such peptides, turning them into high-affinity binders. Consequently, the HLA–gluten peptide complexes are more stable, which facilitates and enhances T-cell responses.

=== Genetics ===
The vast majority of people with coeliac disease have one of two types (out of seven) of the HLA-DQ protein. HLA-DQ is part of the MHC class II antigen-presenting receptor (also called the human leukocyte antigen) system and is used by the immune system to distinguish between the body's own cells and others. The two subunits of the HLA-DQ protein are encoded by the HLA-DQA1 and HLA-DQB1 genes, located on the short arm of chromosome 6.

There are seven HLA-DQ variants (DQ2 and DQ4–DQ9). Over 95% of people with coeliac disease have the isoform of DQ2 or DQ8, which is inherited in families. The reason these genes increase the risk of coeliac disease is that the receptors formed by these genes bind to gliadin peptides more tightly than other forms of the antigen-presenting receptor. Therefore, these forms of the receptor are more likely to activate T lymphocytes and initiate the autoimmune process.

Most people with coeliac bear a two-gene HLA-DQ2 haplotype called DQ2.5. This haplotype is composed of two adjacent gene alleles, DQA1*0501 and DQB1*0201, which encode the two subunits, DQ α^{5} and DQ β^{2}. In most individuals, this DQ2.5 isoform is encoded by one of two chromosomes 6 inherited from parents (DQ2.5cis). Most coeliacs inherit only one copy of this DQ2.5 haplotype, while some inherit it from both parents; the latter are especially at risk of coeliac disease as well as being more susceptible to severe complications. The frequency of coeliac disease haplotypes can vary by geography.

Some individuals inherit DQ2.5 from one parent and an additional portion of the haplotype (either DQB1*02 or DQA1*05) from the other parent, increasing risk. Less commonly, some individuals inherit the DQA1*05 allele from one parent and the DQB1*02 from the other parent (DQ2.5trans), and these individuals are at similar risk of coeliac disease as those with a single DQ2.5-bearing chromosome 6. Among those with coeliac disease who do not have DQ2.5 (cis or trans) or DQ8 (encoded by the haplotype DQA1*03:DQB1*0302), 2-5% have the DQ2.2 isoform, and the remaining 2% lack DQ2 or DQ8.

Other genetic factors have been reported in coeliac disease, but involvement in the disease has variable geographic recognition. Only the HLA-DQ loci show a consistent involvement across the global population. Many of the detected loci are associated with other autoimmune diseases. The prevalence of the HLA-DQ2 genotype and gluten consumption has increased over time. Since untreated coeliac disease can cause serious health problems and affect fertility, it would be expected that HLA-DQ2 and HLA-DQ8 would become less common. The opposite is true—they are most common in areas where gluten-rich foods have been eaten for thousands of years. The HLA-DQ2 gene may have been genetically favoured in the past because it helps protect against tooth decay.

=== Prolamins ===
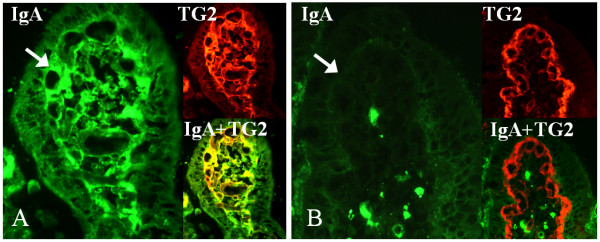
Small-bowel mucosal TG2 (red)-specific IgA deposits (green). A) Positive staining (arrow) in the mucosal villous of a short-term treated coeliac disease patient (gluten-free diet for three years). B) Negative IgA deposits (arrow) in the small-bowel mucosa of a long-term treated coeliac disease patient (gluten-free diet for eight years). Co-localisation of IgA deposits with TG2 is shown in yellow.

Most of the proteins in food responsible for the immune reaction in coeliac disease are prolamins. These are storage proteins rich in proline (prol-) and glutamine (-amin) that dissolve in alcohols and are resistant to proteases and peptidases of the gut. Prolamins are found in cereal grains with different grains having different but related prolamins: wheat (gliadin), barley (hordein), rye (secalin) and oats (avenin).

=== Tissue transglutaminase ===
Tissue transglutaminase modifies gluten peptides into a form that may stimulate the immune system more effectively. These peptides are modified by tTG in two ways, deamidation or transamidation.

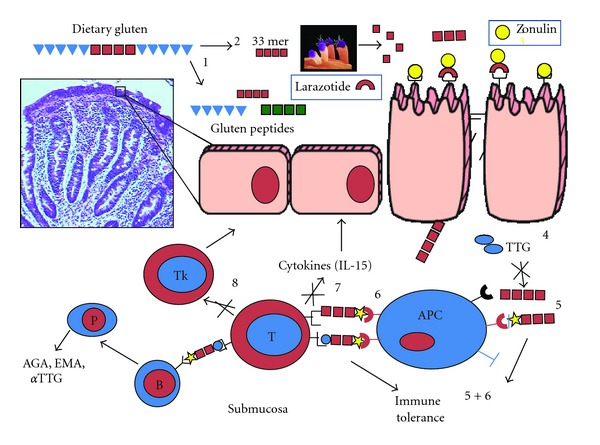
Schematic representation of intestinal mucosal events involved in coeliac disease pathogenesis

Deamidation is the reaction by which a glutamate residue is formed by cleavage of the epsilon-amino group of a glutamine side chain. Transamidation is the cross-linking of a glutamine residue from the gliadin peptide to a lysine residue of tTg in a reaction that is catalysed by the transglutaminase. Cross-linking may occur either within or outside the active site of the enzyme. The latter case yields a permanently covalently linked complex between the gliadin and the tTg. This results in the formation of new epitopes believed to trigger the primary immune response of the autoantibodies against tTg.

Stored biopsies from people with suspected coeliac disease have revealed that autoantibody deposits in the subclinical coeliacs are detected before clinical disease.

=== Villous atrophy and malabsorption ===
The inflammatory process, mediated by T cells, leads to disruption of the structure and function of the small bowel's mucosal lining and causes malabsorption as it impairs the body's ability to absorb nutrients from food.

Alternative causes of this tissue damage have been proposed. They involve the release of interleukin 15 and activation of the innate immune system by a shorter gluten peptide (p31–43/49).

== Diagnosis ==
The variety in symptoms, overlap with other disorders, and lack of awareness in medical professionals often complicate the diagnosis of coeliac disease by leading to a delay in the diagnosis. A diagnosis may take more than a decade after symptoms develop, and most people with coeliac disease remain undiagnosed. Delays in diagnosis can reduce quality of life, use more medical resources and increase risk of complications associated with the disease.

Coeliac disease is diagnosed based on symptoms, blood tests, and biopsies of the small intestine. To make an accurate diagnosis, an individual must be consuming gluten, as the reliability of biopsies and blood tests reduces if a person is on a gluten-free diet. In those who have already reduced their gluten intake, reintroducing gluten (gluten challenge) may be required to reach an accurate diagnosis. Within months of eliminating gluten from one's diet, antibodies associated with coeliac disease decrease, meaning that gluten has to be reintroduced several weeks before diagnostic testing.

=== Blood tests ===
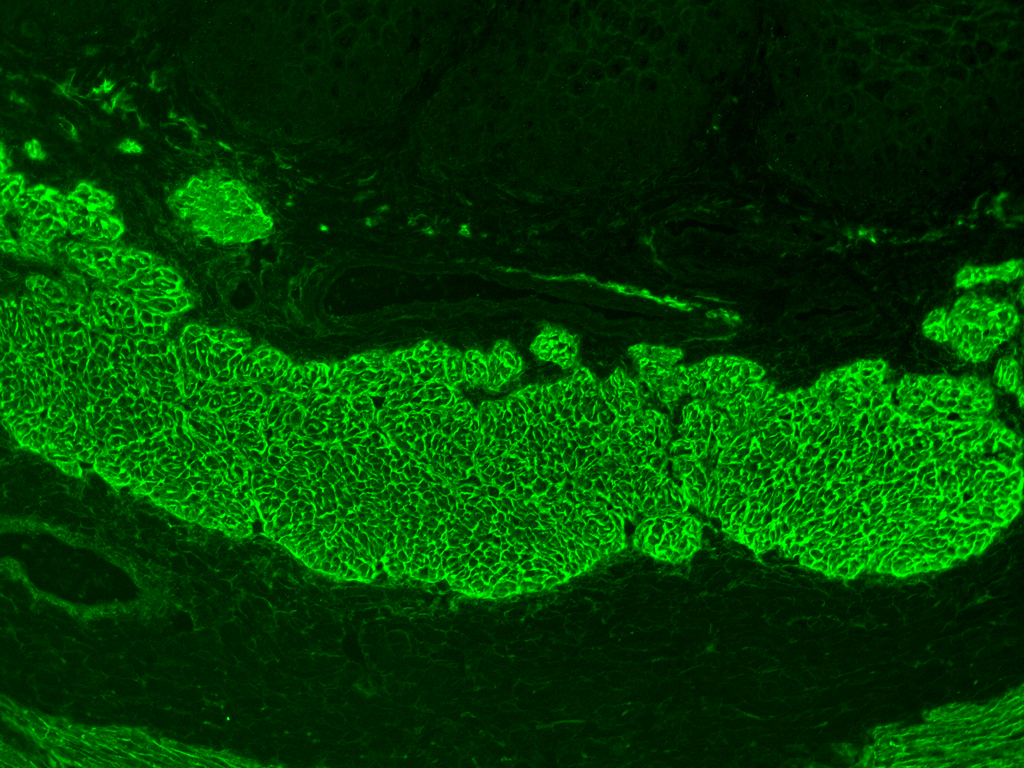
Immunofluorescence staining pattern of endomysial antibodies on a monkey oesophagus tissue sample

Current medical guidelines recommend testing tissue transglutaminase 2 immunoglobulin A (TTG IgA) in those with suspected coeliac disease. Because IgA deficiency is more common in those with coeliac disease, guidelines recommend testing for IgA deficiency as a part of the diagnostic workup for coeliac disease. If an individual with IgA deficiency is getting tested for coeliac disease, immunoglobulin G (IgG) based tests such as deamidated gliadin peptide IgG (DGP IgG) or endomysial antibody (EMA) can be used instead of IgA-based tests. Antigliadin antibodies (AGA) and antireticulin antibodies (ARA) were historically used to test for coeliac disease; however, due to the development of more accurate tests, they are no longer recommended. Due to the risk of false positive or negative serological tests and the consequences of leaving coeliac disease untreated or introducing unnecessary dietary restrictions. In the case of a false positive, biopsies are used to confirm the diagnosis regardless of blood test results.

TG2 IgA has a high sensitivity (92.8%) and specificity (97.9%), and is cost-efficient and widely available, making it the first choice for serological tests in the diagnosis of coeliac disease. Performance of the TG2 IgA test differs between labs and no formal standardisation between assays exists. The severity of small intestine damage generally correlates with the levels of TG2 IgA found in the blood, meaning that the sensitivity is lower in people who have less damage to their intestines. EMA has a lower sensitivity, but its specificity is near 100%; it can be used to confirm coeliac disease in those who have borderline TG2 IgA levels. EMA testing is costly, hard to interpret, and vulnerable to inter-observer and inter-site variability. DGP IgG is used to evaluate coeliac disease in those with IgA deficiency. Coeliac disease is more common in those with IgA deficiency, so medical guidelines recommend that people being tested for coeliac disease are also tested for IgA deficiency. Because IgA-based tests are unreliable in those with IgA deficiency, IgG-based tests are used instead. These include EMA IgG, DGP IgG, and TTG IgA, which are less accurate than IgA testing. Multiparametric serological assays allowing simultaneous detection of TG2 IgA and total IgA have been proposed to improve screening efficiency for coeliac disease. A study evaluating the Polycheck ® Celiac IgA + total IgA test reported high sensitivity and specificity for TG2 IgA and total IgA measurements in coeliac disease diagnostics.

A 2020 guideline by the European Society of Paediatric Gastroenterology, Hepatology, and Nutrition (ESPGHAN) suggests biopsy can be avoided in children who have symptoms of coeliac disease, TTG IgA levels ten times higher than normal, and a positive EMA antibody. There is insufficient evidence to suggest that a nonbiopsy approach can be used in adults. Genetic testing is not needed to diagnose coeliac disease, but is sometimes used to clarify discrepancies between blood tests and histology. In those who have already started a gluten-free diet, HLA testing can help to determine whether a gluten challenge should be performed.

=== Endoscopy ===
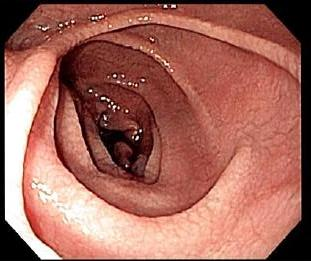
Endoscopic still of duodenum of a person with coeliac disease showing scalloping of folds and "cracked-mud" appearance to mucosa

An upper endoscopy with biopsy of the duodenum (beyond the duodenal bulb) or jejunum is performed to obtain multiple samples from the duodenum. Not all areas may be equally affected; if biopsies are taken from healthy bowel tissue, the result would be a false negative. Even in the same bioptic fragment, different degrees of damage may be present.

Most people with coeliac disease have a small intestine that appears to be normal on endoscopy before the biopsies are examined. Endoscopic features of coeliac disease include scalloping of the small bowel folds (pictured), fissures, a mosaic pattern to the mucosa, prominence of the submucosa blood vessels, and a nodular pattern to the mucosa.

Capsule endoscopy (CE) allows identification of typical mucosal changes observed in coeliac disease and may be used as an alternative to endoscopy in those who cannot or do not want one.

=== Pathology ===
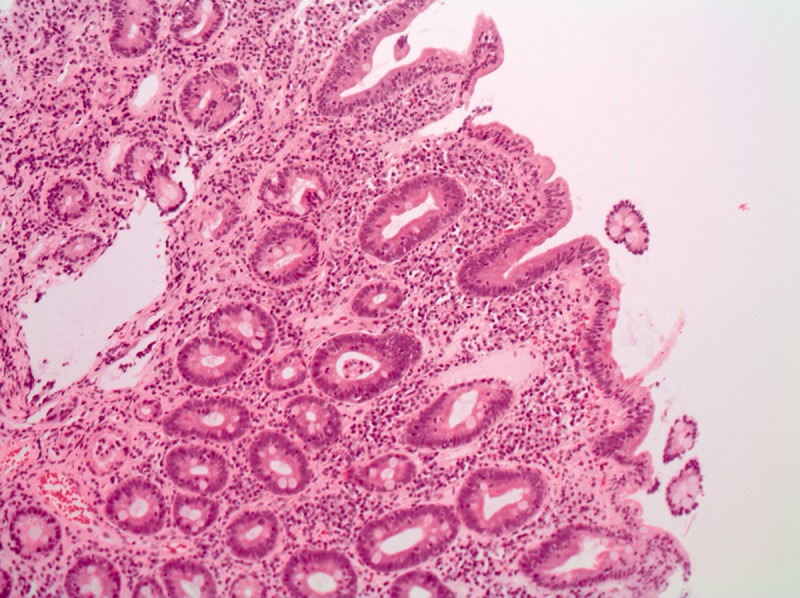
Histology of biopsy from the second part of the duodenum, showing villous atrophy

The Marsh-Oberhuber classification is commonly used to assess the pathological changes seen in coeliac disease. Marsh originally described three different stages of coeliac disease lesions in 1992. These three stages were updated in 1999 by Oberhuber to classify stage three further. The Marsh classification is based on three histological features: intraepithelial lymphocytes count above 25/100 enterocytes (intraepithelial lymphocytosis), elongated crypts of Lieberkuhn (crypt hyperplasia), and shortening or absence of villi (villous atrophy). As these features can be seen in other disorders, they are not diagnostic for coeliac disease without serological or clinical indications. Current guidelines do not recommend a repeat biopsy unless there is no improvement in the symptoms on a gluten-free diet

Marsh classification
Type	Increased intraepithelial lymphocytes	Crypt hyperplasia	Villi
0 (normal)	<40 lymphocytes/100 enterocytes	Normal	Normal
1 (infiltrative)	>40 lymphocytes/100 enterocytes	Normal	Normal
2 (hyperplastic)	>40 lymphocytes/100 enterocytes	Increased	Normal
3a (destructive)	>40 lymphocytes/100 enterocytes	Increased	Mild atrophy
3b (destructive)	>40 lymphocytes/100 enterocytes	Increased	Moderate atrophy
3c (destructive)	>40 lymphocytes/100 enterocytes	Increased	Complete atrophy

=== Gluten challenge ===
A gluten challenge is no longer required to confirm the diagnosis in patients with intestinal lesions compatible with coeliac disease and a positive response to a gluten-free diet. A gluten challenge involves consuming over 10 grams of gluten a day for three months or until an individual tests positive for TG2 IgA. Nevertheless, in some cases, a gluten challenge with a subsequent biopsy may be useful to support the diagnosis, for example, in people with positive HLA genetic testing who have negative blood antibodies and are already on a gluten-free diet. Gluten challenge is discouraged before the age of 6 years and during pubertal growth.

=== Differential diagnosis ===
The histopathological features associated with coeliac disease can arise from other conditions as well. Differential diagnosis of negative coeliac blood tests and villous atrophy or increased inter-epithelial lymphocytes includes tropical sprue, eosinophilic gastroenteritis, lactose intolerance, lymphoma, Crohn's disease, Helicobacter pylori, drug-induced enteropathy (azathioprine, methotrexate, mycophenolate, olmesartan, colchicinenon, non-steroidal anti-inflammatory drugs, and proton pump inhibitors), Whipple's disease, giardiasis, radiation enteritis, tuberculosis, Zollinger–Ellison syndrome, collagenous sprue, common variable immunodeficiency, autoimmune enteropathy, HIV enteropathy, small intestinal bacterial overgrowth, and gastrinoma with acid hypersecretion. If the histological changes improve with a gluten-free diet despite negative coeliac disease blood tests, a diagnosis of seronegative coeliac disease may be made.

Positive blood tests for coeliac disease with a lack of changes in the bowels can be caused by errors in collecting blood for the test, recent infections, congestive heart failure, chronic liver disease, and hypergammaglobulinemia. Potential coeliac disease, formerly known as "latent coeliac disease", is diagnosed when there are positive coeliac blood tests, positive HLA genetic testing, and a lack of villous atrophy.

Non-celiac gluten sensitivity (NCGS) is a functional disorder that causes intestinal and extraintestinal symptoms in response to gluten. The symptoms of NCGS are often similar to those seen in coeliac disease; they tend to have a more rapid onset and offset when compared to coeliac disease. The diagnosis of NCGS is made by excluding coeliac disease and wheat allergy, and a resolution of symptoms after adhering to a gluten-free diet.

== Screening ==
There is debate as to the benefits of widespread screening measures for coeliac disease. In 2017, the United States Preventive Services Task Force published a report which found insufficient evidence to make a recommendation regarding screening for coeliac disease in those without symptoms. Due to the lack of evidence that screening for coeliac disease in those without symptoms, clinical guidelines advise testing people based on symptoms and selective screening for certain populations at a higher risk of developing coeliac disease.

National Institute for Health and Clinical Excellence (NICE) indications of testing for coeliac disease
Testing recommended	Testing considered
Persistent unexplained gastrointestinal symptoms; Faltering growth; Chronic fatigue; Severe or persistent mouth ulcers; Unexplained iron, vitamin B_{12}, or folate deficiency; At the diagnosis of type 1 diabetes; At the diagnosis of an autoimmune thyroid disease; Irritable bowel syndrome in adults; First-degree relative of those with coeliac disease	Metabolic bone disease (reduced bone mineral density or osteomalacia); Unexplained neurological symptoms (such as peripheral neuropathy and ataxia); Fertility problems or recurrent miscarriage; Persistently raised liver enzymes with unknown cause; Dental enamel defects; Down syndrome; Turner syndrome

== Management ==
Currently, the only treatment for coeliac disease is a lifelong gluten-free diet (GFD). Current guidelines recommend regular follow-up doctor's appointments, monitoring the disease activity, preventative care, and consultation with a dietitian.

=== Diet ===
A GFD involves removing all food and drink that contains wheat, rye, barley, and gluten derivatives. Coeliac disease symptoms can improve within days of adopting a GFD, and the diet improves quality of life, prevents further complications, and can normalise some effects of the disease such as stunted growth.

The GFD can be difficult, requiring significant education and motivation. Additionally, the GFD diet may lead to nutritional deficiencies due to difficulties accessing nutritionally balanced gluten-free food. As such, a referral to a dietitian is recommended by treatment guidelines. A dietitian can help those with coeliac disease identify gluten-containing food and maintain a nutritionally balanced diet.

The exact amount of gluten that may be tolerable for those with coeliac disease varies, with some people able to consume around 35 mg per day without damage to the intestines, while others can not tolerate more than 10 mg a day. Currently, international regulatory agencies require a product to contain less than 20 ppm (about 6 mg per day) of gluten to be labelled as gluten-free.

=== Monitoring ===
Long-term monitoring of those with coeliac disease is an important aspect of managing the disease. Usually, someone newly diagnosed with coeliac disease is advised to visit their doctor multiple times a year, with follow-ups becoming less frequent (once or twice a year) after initial diagnosis. After the diagnosis, follow-up doctor's appointments focus on controlling symptoms, improving compliance with the GFD, preventative care, monitoring for comorbid diseases, and detection of complications. The exact testing done depends on an individual's needs but may include a complete blood count, iron panel, thyroid testing, liver enzymes, and vitamin D levels. Due to osteoporosis being a common complication of coeliac disease, bone mineral density may be tested with a DEXA scan.

Although negative anti-TG2 IgA tests do not always correlate with adherence to a GFD, guidelines recommend routine testing for anti-TG2 IgA, as positive values may indicate gluten intake. The role of repeat biopsies is controversial, with studies finding little evidence that it is beneficial outside of investigating persistent symptoms

Alongside routine vaccinations, current guidelines recommend pneumococcal vaccination due to increased risk of pneumonia in coeliac disease.

== Non-responsive coeliac disease ==
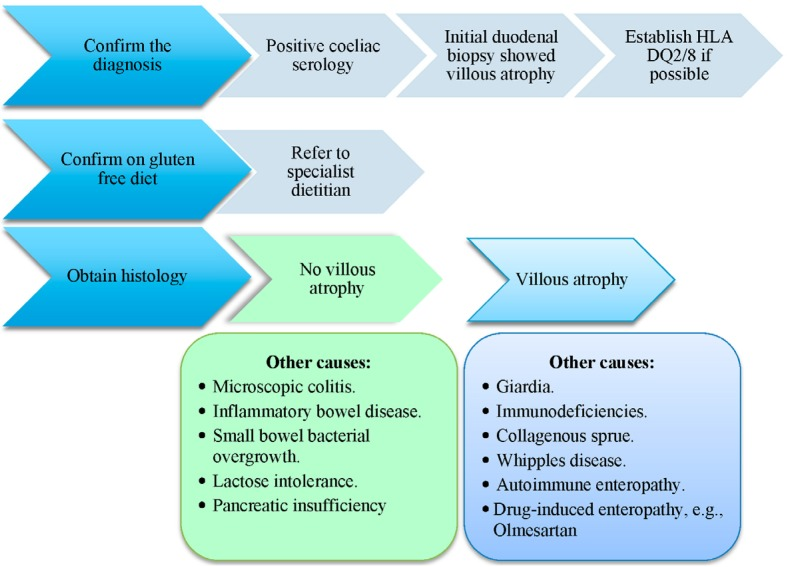
Approach to investigating non-responsive coeliac disease

Around 20–40% of those with coeliac disease experience non-responsive coeliac disease (NRCD), which is the continuation of symptoms despite elimination of gluten from their diets for at least 6 to 12 months.

The most common cause of NRCD is unintentional gluten ingestion; however other conditions such as small intestinal bacterial overgrowth, giardiasis, disaccharide or FODMAP intolerance, Crohn's disease, fructose intolerance, microscopic colitis, pancreatic insufficiency, irritable bowel syndrome, and lactose intolerance can cause persistent symptoms or villous atrophy despite adhering to the GFD.

=== Refractory coeliac disease ===
About 1.5% of those with coeliac disease develop refractory coeliac disease (RCD), which is the persistence of symptoms of malabsorption and villous atrophy despite at least one year of the GFD. RCD has a high mortality and morbidity rate, is associated with more severe symptoms and is more common in older individuals (50<). Those with RCD are often referred to specialists and the diagnostic process usually includes monitoring compliance with the GFD, confirming the initial diagnoses of coeliac disease, and excluding alternative explanations for small intestine damage such as Crohn's disease, peptic duodenitis, small intestinal bacterial overgrowth, hypogammaglobulinemia, common variable immunodeficiency, autoimmune enteropathy, tropical sprue, collagenous sprue, and eosinophilic enteritis.

There are two subtypes of RCD, type 1 and type 2. Biopsies of the duodenum and analysis of the intraepithelial lymphocytes in the duodenum are required to distinguish between the two types. Type 2 RCD is characterised by abnormal T cells in the small intestine; these findings are absent in type 1 RCD. In type 2 RCD, healthy lymphocytes are replaced by abnormal lymphocytes, increasing the risk of complications such as enteropathy-associated T-cell lymphoma (EATL), severe malabsorption, and ulcerative jejunoileitis, and results in poorer outcomes.

Type 1 RCD is treated with steroids, azathioprine, and budesonide. The treatment of type 2 RCD is more complicated as it often does not improve with steroids, and azathioprine may increase the risk of EATL. Proposed treatment of type 2 RCD includes cladribine, cyclosporine, and stem cell transplants.

== Outlook ==
Individuals with coeliac disease have a higher risk of developing cancer in certain parts of the gastrointestinal tract (oropharynx, oesophagus, and small intestine) compared to those without the disease. Small intestinal lymphoma is the most common cancer caused by complications of coeliac disease; however, it is still considered a rare complication. The prognosis for enteropathy‐associated T‐cell lymphoma (EATL) is poor with low survival rates. Risk factors for developing cancer among those with coeliac disease include older age and refractory coeliac disease. Coeliac disease also increases mortality risk; however, the extent of the increase is inconsistent across research.

== Epidemiology ==
In most countries, between 1 in 50 and 1 in 200 people have coeliac disease. Rates vary in different regions of the world; coeliac disease is less common in places where gluten-containing crops are rarely eaten, and in parts of east Asia and sub-Saharan Africa where populations rarely carry the HLA-DQ genes that predispose to the disease. The risk of developing coeliac disease is higher in those who have a first-degree relative with the disease; a less dramatic increase in risk is also seen in second-degree relatives.

Diagnoses of coeliac disease have increased dramatically in recent decades due to increased awareness of the disease and the availability of blood testing. However, the disease is still thought to be underdiagnosed, with an estimated 70% of people with coeliac disease undiagnosed and untreated. Undiagnosed cases are more common in poorer areas and in countries that do not regularly test at-risk people.

While coeliac disease can arise at any age, most people develop the disease before age 10. Roughly 20 percent of individuals with coeliac disease are diagnosed after 60 years of age. Coeliac disease is slightly more common in women than in men, though some of that may be due to differences in diagnostic practice, as men with gastrointestinal symptoms are less likely to receive a biopsy than women. Other populations at increased risk for coeliac disease, include individuals with Down and Turner syndromes, type 1 diabetes, and autoimmune thyroid disease, including both hyperthyroidism (overactive thyroid) and hypothyroidism (underactive thyroid).

== History ==
=== Etymology and early history ===
The term coeliac comes from Greek word κοιλιακός (koiliakós), meaning "abdominal", and was introduced in the 19th century in a translation of what is generally regarded as an Ancient Greek description of the disease by Aretaeus of Cappadocia.

Humans first cultivated grains in the Neolithic period (beginning about 9500 BCE) in the Fertile Crescent in Western Asia; coeliac disease likely did not occur before this time. Aretaeus of Cappadocia, living in the 2nd century in the same area, recorded a malabsorptive syndrome with chronic diarrhoea, causing a debilitation of the whole body. A 15th-century medical prescription from Mamluk Cairo, attributed to Shams al-Din ibn al-'Afif, the personal physician to Sultan Barsbay and director of the Qalawun complex hospital, describes a treatment for symptoms consistent with coeliac disease. The remedy combines herbs and plant waters for patients intolerant to wheat.

=== Post-1800s ===
Aretaeus of Cappadocia's "Cœliac Affection" gained the attention of Western medicine when Francis Adams presented a translation of Aretaeus's work at the Sydenham Society in 1856. The patient described in Aretaeus's work had stomach pain and was atrophied, pale, feeble, and incapable of work. The diarrhoea manifested as loose stools that were white, malodorous, and flatulent, and the disease was intractable and liable to periodic return. Aretaeus believed a lack of heat in the stomach, necessary for digestion, and a reduced ability to distribute the digestive products throughout the body, caused this incomplete digestion, resulting in diarrhoea. He regarded this as an affliction of the old and more commonly affecting women, explicitly excluding children. The cause, according to Aretaeus, was sometimes either another chronic disease or even consuming "a copious draught of cold water."

The paediatrician Samuel Gee gave the first modern-day description of the condition in children in a lecture at the Hospital for Sick Children, Great Ormond Street, London, in 1887. Gee acknowledged earlier descriptions and terms for the disease and adopted the same term as Aretaeus (coeliac disease). He perceptively stated: "If the patient can be cured at all, it must be by means of diet." Gee recognised that milk intolerance is a problem with coeliac children and that highly starched foods should be avoided. However, he forbade rice, sago, fruit, and vegetables, which all would have been safe to eat, and he recommended raw meat as well as thin slices of toasted bread. Gee highlighted particular success with a child fed "a quart of the best Dutch mussels daily"; the child could not bear this diet for more than one season.

Christian Archibald Herter, an American physician, wrote a book in 1908 on children with coeliac disease, which he called "intestinal infantilism". He noted their growth was retarded and that fat was better tolerated than carbohydrate. The eponym Gee-Herter disease was sometimes used to acknowledge both contributions. Sidney V. Haas, an American paediatrician, reported positive effects of a diet of bananas in 1924. This diet remained in vogue until the actual cause of coeliac disease was determined.

While a role for carbohydrates had been suspected, the link with wheat was not made until the 1940s by the Dutch paediatrician Willem Karel Dicke. Clinical improvement of his patients during the Dutch famine of 1944–1945 (during which flour was scarce) likely contributed to his discovery. Dicke noticed that the shortage of bread led to a significant drop in the death rate among children affected by coeliac disease from greater than 35% to essentially zero. He also reported that once wheat was again available after the conflict, the mortality rate soared to previous levels. The link with the gluten component of wheat was made in 1952 by a team from Birmingham, England. Villous atrophy was described by British physician John W. Paulley in 1954 on samples taken at surgery. This encouraged biopsy samples taken by endoscopy. Throughout the 1960s, other features of coeliac disease were elucidated. Its hereditary character was recognised in 1965. In 1966, dermatitis herpetiformis was linked to gluten sensitivity.

== Society and culture ==
May has been designated as "Coeliac Awareness Month" by several coeliac organisations.

=== Dietary challenges ===
Adhering to the GFD can negatively impact those with coeliac disease, requiring major changes for an individual and their family. The restrictive nature of the GFD can lead to no longer enjoying food and pressure to be constantly vigilant about diet. The social life of those with coeliac disease is also negatively affected by the GFD. Cross-contamination—gluten-free food coming into contact with gluten—is a common worry for those eating away from home. Eating out may cause anxiety as it requires disclosing dietary restrictions and risking potential cross-contamination. Receiving a diagnosis of coeliac disease and the dietary changes required to manage the disorder can affect a person's relationship with food and lead to disordered eating as well as anxiety and depression. A diagnosis of coeliac disease can carry stigma, which may affect individuals' ability to seek help or disclose their condition when needed.

Accessing gluten-free food can be a burden due to limited availability and variety, as well as higher costs compared to gluten-containing foods. Over the past ten years, the costs of gluten-free food have decreased; however, it remains significantly more expensive than gluten-containing food. There has been an increase in the popularity of the GFD among those without coeliac disease, which has improved the availability of gluten-free foods. However, the increase in those without coeliac disease eating gluten-free may lead to decreased vigilance of food manufacturers and misunderstandings around the importance of avoiding cross-contamination.

Many gluten-free substitutions are lower in nutritional quality and may lack vitamins and nutrients that their gluten-containing counterparts have. Ingredients commonly used in gluten-free substitutes, such as rice, potato, corn, and tapioca starches, have lower levels of fibre, carbohydrates, and vitamins but are higher in sugars and fats than gluten-containing diets.

Currently, there are no federal regulations for gluten in non-food products such as medications, cosmetics, and hygiene products. Although the amount of gluten in non-food products is usually minimal, mislabelling of gluten products can confuse people and potentially adversely impact health.

=== Christian churches and the Eucharist ===
Speaking generally, the various denominations of Christians celebrate a Eucharist in which a wafer or small piece of sacramental bread from wheat bread is blessed and then eaten. Small communion wafers typically contain 2–5 mg of gliadin if they are not a gluten-free variety, and many people with coeliac disease report altering their religious practices because of coeliac symptoms caused by these wafers.

Some Christian churches such as the United Methodist, Christian Reformed, Episcopal, Anglican and Lutheran churches offer their communicants gluten-free alternatives, usually in the form of a rice-based cracker or gluten-free bread. Catholics may receive from the chalice alone, or ask for gluten-reduced hosts; gluten-free ones however are not considered still to be wheat bread, and hence are invalid matter.

Roman Catholic doctrine states that for a valid Eucharist, the bread to be used at Mass must be made from wheat. Low-gluten hosts meet all of the Catholic Church's requirements, but they are not entirely gluten-free. As of 2017, the Vatican still disapproves of the use of gluten-free bread for Holy Communion.

=== Passover ===
The Jewish festival of Pesach (Passover) may present problems with its obligation to eat matzah, which is unleavened bread made in a strictly controlled manner from wheat, barley, spelt, oats, or rye. In addition, many other grains that are normally used as substitutes for people with gluten sensitivity, including rice, are avoided altogether on Passover by Ashkenazi Jews. Many kosher-for-Passover products avoid grains altogether and are therefore gluten-free. Potato starch is the primary starch used to replace grains.

== Research directions ==
Research into diagnosis has aimed to develop new blood tests, including tests that could be used for those who are not currently eating gluten. These tests measure certain immune cells that react to gluten, such as CD4+ T cells and HLA-DQ-gluten tetramers.

New technologies have been developed to help people follow a GFD in recent years. Food sensors, such as the Nima sensor, could help people measure the amount of gluten in food to prevent accidental gluten consumption. Testing kits that measure gluten levels in urine and waste may help measure adherence the GFD.

Many strategies have been proposed to develop new treatments for coeliac disease. Altering wheat to be safer for those with coeliac disease has been explored using methods such as genetic wheat manipulation and using a chemical process (transamidation) that changes gluten proteins so they no longer trigger an immune reaction. Medications and techniques such as chitosan and AGY gluten sequestering aim to prevent gluten from interacting with the immune system. Glutenases are enzymes taken with food designed to help break down and neutralise gluten in the intestines. Glutenases being studied as of 2022 include latiglutenase–ALV003, Aspergillus niger prolyl endoprotease, Kuma030–TAK-062, and endoproptease-40.

Larazotide acetate is a peptide that helps tighten the junctions between intestinal cells, reducing intestinal permeability. It helps decrease reactions to gluten by preventing gluten fragments from passing through the gut lining and triggering the immune system. Treatments focused on immunomodulation aim to target the T cells that react to gluten and reduce intolerance to gluten.
