= Gotthilf Weisstein =

German journalist, writer and bibliophile

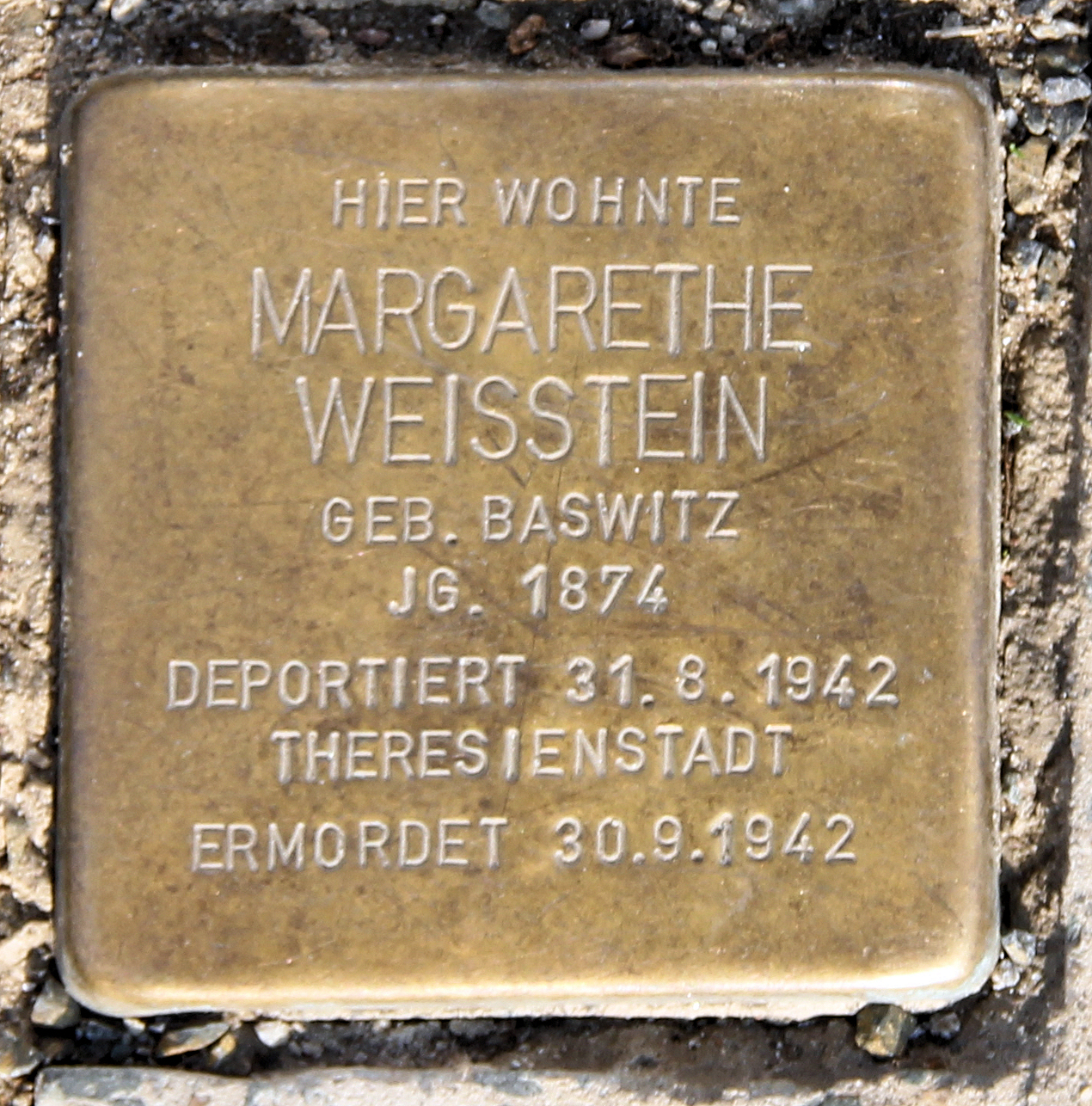
Stolperstein Badensche Str. 21 (Wilmd) Margarethe Weisstein

Gotthilf Weisstein (6 February 1852 – 21 May 1907) was a German journalist, writer and bibliophile.

== Life ==
Born in Berlin, Weisstein was the son of a merchant. His uncle was the social physician Salomon Neumann. He attended Grützmacher's pre-school at Hausvogteiplatz and then the Französisches Gymnasium Berlin, where he passed the Abitur in 1870. He studied classical philology, Sanskrit and philosophy, later German Studies in Berlin with Moriz Haupt, Moritz Lazarus and Heymann Steinthal. A doctoral project seems to have failed. Weisstein gave up his intention of pursuing an academic career and became a journalist. He obtained his first editorial position at the Stuttgarter Chronik, then worked for the Stuttgarter Neues Tagblatt; from 1880 he was employed as a permanent contributor to the Berliner Tageblatt and the Tribüne, from 1884 to 1887 he was, alongside Oscar Blumenthal Feuilletonredakteur and theatre editor of the Berliner Tageblatt.

Then he devoted time to his abandoned German studies. Later he worked for the National-Zeitung, for which he wrote many reviews, essays and feuilletons. Along with Fedor von Zobeltitz and others, he was a founding member of the Gesellschaft der Bibliophilen in Weimar in 1899 and of the Berliner Bibliophilen Abend (1905).

== Work ==
He made significant contributions to research in literary history (Goethe, Schiller, Kleist, Maler Müller, Karl Philipp Moritz among others). Berlin history and theatre history were his special fields, many of his extensive feuilletons deal with old Berlin topics. Some planned works did not come to fruition due to his early death, such as a Geschichte des Berliner Humors, an account of the effectiveness of the Berlin theatre director Döbbelin and a bibliography of German private prints.

As a bibliographically educated collector, he proceeded, as Fedor von Zobeltitz writes, "literarily", and drew "even the short lived, the ephemeral and the ephemeral, into his domain" ... "if it seemed important to him for the characterisation of a dramatic epoch". "Weisstein was ... a tracker of lost rarities with true explorer instincts, such as I found later only in Schüddekopf". (Zobeltitz)

== Weisstein Library ==
His extensive library was catalogued after his death, given as a bequest to the Staatsbibliothek zu Berlin by his brother, the building councillor Herman Weisstein, in 1923 and looked after there as a librarian by Hans Lindau, a son of Weisstein's friend Paul Lindau. Through Herman Weisstein, all books were provided with a simple bookplate. After Herman's death in 1924, his widow Margarethe Weisstein (possibly already under the impression of increasing anti-Jewish repression) had the books sold by the antiquarian bookseller Martin Breslauer in 1933. A small part of the collection was bought back by the State Library with funds from the Notgemeinschaft der Deutschen Wissenschaft, and another 700 books on theatre history were purchased by the Clara Ziegler Foundation (today the Deutsches Theatermuseum). Today, copies from Weisstein's library frequently turn up in the antiquarian book trade. The catalogue was published in 1913 in 2 volumes with 9124 entries. It is still an informative reference work for prints on German theatre history and for rare prints of the classical and romantic literary periods. Weisstein's presumably extensive estate of manuscripts and letters is lost. Individual items, such as a postcard Fontanes to Weisstein, are offered in the autograph trade.

Weisstein died in Berlin at the age of 55. He was buried in the Weißensee cemetery. On his grave is the distich:

Many were delighted by your spirit and your always cheerful speech.
You will remain unforgotten by all who knew you.

== Work ==
- With Richard Nathanson: Paul Lindau. Eine Charakteristik. Stuhr, Berlin 1875.
- Beiträge zu Maler Müller's Lebensgeschichte. Mosse, Berlin 1883.
- Carl Philipp Moritz. Beiträge zu seiner Lebensgeschichte. Harrwitz, Berlin 1899.
- Freundesgaben für Karl Frenzel zu seinem goldenen Doktorjubiläum am 19 February 1903. Nationalzeitung, Berlin 1903.
- Des vergnügten Weinhändlers Louis Drucker's humoristischer Nachlaß (Berliner Curiosa. Vol. 3, ZDB-ID 2014625-5). Neu herausgegeben, mit biographisch-kritischen Notizen versehen. Frensdorff, Berlin 1906.
- Meininger Erinnerungen. E. Meyer, Berlin 1906.
- Bibliothek Weisstein. Katalog der Bücher des verstorbenen Bibliophilen Gotthilf Weisstein. 2 volumes. Published by Fedor von Zobeltitz. Im Auftrag des Königlichen Baurats Hermann Weisstein für die Gesellschaft der Bibliophilen. Drugulin, Leipzig 1913.
- Heitere Episoden aus der Geschichte des Theaterzettels (Reprint im Luttertaler Händedruck. Vol. 3). Nach älteren Quellen und eigenen Sammlungen mitgeteilt von Gotthilf Weisstein. Luttertaler Händedruck, Bargfeld 2007, ISBN 978-3-928779-23-4.
- Berichte aus der Bücherwelt (Edition im Luttertaler Händedruck. Vol. 11). Published by Ulrich Goerdten. Luttertaler Händedruck, Bargfeld 2007, ISBN 978-3-928779-24-1.
- Alt-Berlin in Gotthilf Weissteins Feuilletons (Berlinische Denkwürdigkeiten. Vol. 2). Published by Ulrich Goerdten. Luttertaler Händedruck, Bargfeld 2007, ISBN 978-3-928779-25-8.

== Editorship ==
- Don Carlos, der Infanterist von Spanien. Von Silvius Landsberger. Frensdorff, Berlin 1905. Numerized
