= Heyno Gottschalk =

Heyno Gottschalk († 1541 in Oldenstadt) was from 1506 to 1531 the last abbot of the Benedictine abbey of Oldenstadt. 1523 he became Diffinitor of the Bursfelde Congregation. He was also reader of Martin Luther's writings. Luther wrote a letter to him 1528 and encouraged him to stay in monastery. Abbot Heino remained a Lutheran monk to the end of his life, although the Duke seized the monastery's property.
