= Landmark Land Company =

Real-estate developer in California, US

- Trade name: LLND.PK
- Industry: Real estate development
- Founded: 1971; 55 years ago
- Headquarters: Indian Wells, California
- Area served: United States; Europe; Caribbean
- Key people: Andy Vossler, President & CEO
- Website: www.landmarkgolf.com

Landmark Land Company, also known as Landmark Golf, is an American real-estate development company specializing in the creation of golf courses and upscale communities.

== History ==
The company was formed in 1971 when Gerald G. Barton took control of the Godchaux Sugar Company (also known as Godchaux-Henderson Sugar Company, Inc.), a bankrupt Louisiana corporation established in 1865 with land holdings between New Orleans and Baton Rouge. He changed the name to Landmark Land.

Ernie Vossler and Joe Walser, Jr. formed their initial company, Unique Golf Concepts in 1971. Landmark Land Company, Inc., a publicly owned company, purchased Unique Golf Concepts in 1974; subsequently, Vossler and Walser oversaw the growth of Landmark Land Company.

In 1976, Landmark opened the Oak Tree Golf Club in Oklahoma, designed by Pete Dye. This was soon followed by Belle Terre Country Club in Louisiana, and the La Quinta Resort and Club and Carmel Valley Ranch, both in California. During the next 30 years Landmark built 17 more courses with Dye.

In April 1990, the company was the subject of a probe by the U.S. Securities and Exchange Commission as a result of questionable accounting practices.

In May 1990, the company agreed to sell a 6,700-acre Riverside County parcel for $275 million. In June 1990, the offer was withdrawn.

In 1991, the company agreed to sell its assets for $739 million. The deal fell through that year and the company filed for bankruptcy protection. Its savings and loan was seized by regulators. Barton lost everything.

Landmark moved to Indian Wells, California in 1992. In 2010, the company once again faced cash flow problems. As of August 2018, the company is known as Landmark Golf, and focuses on ownership and development of golf courses.
