= Gluten-free diet =

Diet excluding proteins found in wheat, barley, and rye

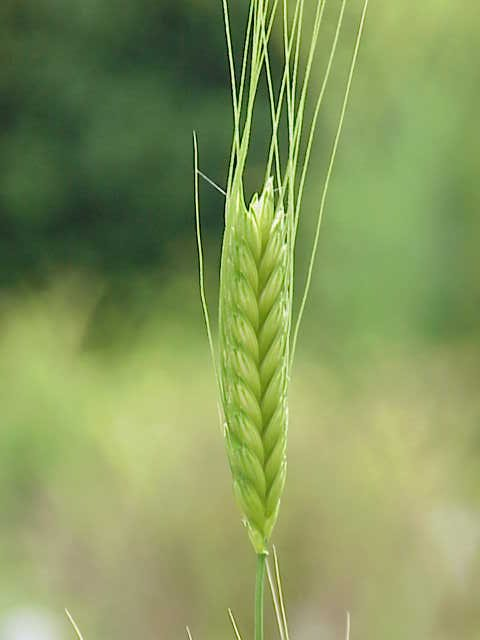
Wheat

A gluten-free diet (GFD) is a nutritional plan that strictly excludes gluten, which is a mixture of prolamin proteins found in wheat (and all of its species and hybrids, such as spelt, kamut, and triticale), as well as barley, rye, and oats. The inclusion of oats in a gluten-free diet remains controversial, and may depend on the oat cultivar and the frequent cross-contamination with other gluten-containing cereals.

Gluten may cause both gastrointestinal and systemic symptoms for those with gluten-related disorders, including coeliac disease (CD), non-coeliac gluten sensitivity (NCGS), and wheat allergy. In these people, the gluten-free diet is demonstrated as an effective treatment, but studies show that up to 79% of the people with coeliac disease have an incomplete recovery of the small bowel, despite a strict gluten-free diet. This is mainly caused by inadvertent ingestion of gluten. People with a poor understanding of a gluten-free diet often believe that they are strictly following the diet, but are making regular errors.

In addition, a gluten-free diet may, in at least some cases, improve gastrointestinal or systemic symptoms in diseases like irritable bowel syndrome, rheumatoid arthritis, or HIV enteropathy, among others. There is no good evidence that gluten-free diets are an alternative medical treatment for people with autism.

The grains that contain gluten are not essential in the human diet. However, an unbalanced selection of food and an incorrect choice of gluten-free replacement products may lead to nutritional deficiencies. Replacing flour from wheat or other gluten-containing cereals with gluten-free flours in commercial products may lead to a lower intake of important nutrients, such as iron and B vitamins. Some gluten-free commercial replacement products are not as enriched or fortified as their gluten-containing counterparts, and often have greater lipid/carbohydrate content. Children especially often over-consume these products, such as snacks and biscuits. Nutritional complications can be prevented by a correct dietary education.

A gluten-free diet may be based on gluten-free foods, such as meat, fish, eggs, milk and dairy products, legumes, nuts, fruits, vegetables, potatoes, rice, and corn. Gluten-free processed foods may be used. Pseudocereals (such as quinoa, amaranth, and buckwheat) and some minor cereals have been found to be suitable alternative choices that can provide adequate nutrition.

== Rationale behind adoption of the diet ==
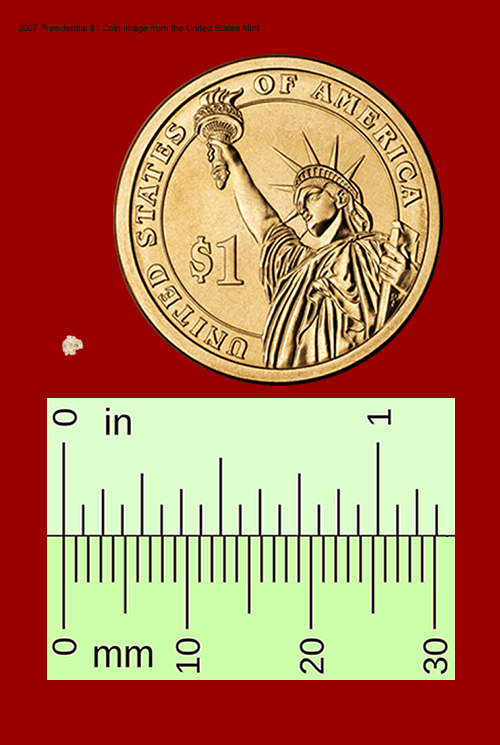
One breadcrumb of this size contains enough gluten to reactivate the autoimmune response in people with coeliac disease when they are following a gluten-free diet, although obvious symptoms may not appear. Consuming gluten even in small quantities, which may be the result of inadvertent cross-contamination, impedes recovery in people with gluten-related disorders.

=== Coeliac disease ===
Coeliac disease (American English: celiac) (CD) is a chronic, immune-mediated, and mainly intestinal process, that appears in genetically predisposed people of all ages. It is caused by the ingestion of gluten, which is present in wheat, barley, rye and derivatives. Coeliac disease is not only a gastrointestinal disease, because it may affect several organs and cause an extensive variety of non-gastrointestinal symptoms, and most importantly, it may often be completely asymptomatic. Added difficulties for diagnosis are the fact that serological markers (anti-tissue transglutaminase [TG2]) are not always present, and many people with coeliac may have minor mucosal lesions, without atrophy of the intestinal villi.

Coeliac disease affects approximately 1–2% of the general population all over the world and is on the increase, but most cases remain unrecognized, undiagnosed and untreated, exposing patients to the risk of long-term complications. People may develop severe disease symptoms and be subjected to extensive investigations for many years before a proper diagnosis is achieved. Untreated coeliac disease may cause malabsorption, reduced quality of life, iron deficiency, osteoporosis, obstetric complications (stillbirth, intrauterine growth restriction, preterm birth, low birthweight, and small for gestational age), an increased risk of intestinal lymphomas and greater mortality. Coeliac disease is associated with some autoimmune diseases, such as diabetes mellitus type 1, thyroiditis, gluten ataxia, psoriasis, vitiligo, autoimmune hepatitis, dermatitis herpetiformis, primary sclerosing cholangitis, and more.

Coeliac disease with "classic symptoms", which include gastrointestinal manifestations such as chronic diarrhea and abdominal distention, malabsorption, loss of appetite, and impaired growth, is currently the least common presentation of the disease and affects predominantly small children generally younger than two years of age.

Coeliac disease with "non-classic symptoms" is the most common clinical type and occurs in older children (over two years old), adolescents and adults. It is characterized by milder or even absent gastrointestinal symptoms and a wide spectrum of non-intestinal manifestations that can involve any organ of the body, and very frequently may be completely asymptomatic both in children (at least in 43% of the cases) and adults.

Following a lifelong gluten-free diet is the only medically accepted treatment for people with coeliac disease.

=== Non-coeliac gluten sensitivity ===
Non-coeliac gluten sensitivity (NCGS) is described as a condition of multiple symptoms that improves when switching to a gluten-free diet, after coeliac disease and wheat allergy are excluded. People with NCGS may develop gastrointestinal symptoms, which resemble those of irritable bowel syndrome (IBS) or a variety of nongastrointestinal symptoms.

Gastrointestinal symptoms may include any of the following: abdominal pain, bloating, bowel habit abnormalities (either diarrhea or constipation), nausea, aerophagia, gastroesophageal reflux disease, and aphthous stomatitis. A range of extra-intestinal symptoms, said to be the only manifestation of NCGS in the absence of gastrointestinal symptoms, have been suggested, but remain controversial. These include: headache, migraine, "brain fog", fatigue, fibromyalgia, joint and muscle pain, leg or arm numbness, tingling of the extremities, dermatitis (eczema or skin rash), atopic disorders such as asthma, rhinitis, other allergies, depression, anxiety, iron-deficiency anemia, folate deficiency or autoimmune diseases. NCGS has also been controversially implicated in some neuropsychiatric disorders, including schizophrenia, eating disorders, autism, peripheral neuropathy, ataxia and attention deficit hyperactivity disorder (ADHD). Above 20% of people with NCGS have IgE-mediated allergy to one or more inhalants, foods or metals, among which most common are mites, graminaceae, parietaria, cat or dog hair, shellfish and nickel. Approximately, 35% of people with NCGS have other food intolerances, mainly lactose intolerance.

The pathogenesis of NCGS is not yet well understood. For this reason, it is a controversial syndrome and some authors still question it. There is evidence that not only gliadin (the main cytotoxic antigen of gluten), but also other proteins named ATIs which are present in gluten-containing cereals (wheat, rye, barley, and their derivatives) may have a role in the development of symptoms. ATIs are potent activators of the innate immune system. FODMAPs, especially fructans, are present in small amounts in gluten-containing grains and have been identified as a possible cause of some gastrointestinal symptoms in persons with NCGS. As of 2019, reviews have concluded that although FODMAPs may play a role in NCGS, they only explain certain gastrointestinal symptoms, such as bloating, but not the extra-digestive symptoms that people with NCGS may develop, such as neurological disorders, fibromyalgia, psychological disturbances, and dermatitis.

After exclusion of coeliac disease and wheat allergy, the subsequent step for diagnosis and treatment of NCGS is to start a strict gluten-free diet to assess if symptoms improve or resolve completely. This may occur within days to weeks of starting a GFD, but improvement may also be due to a non-specific, placebo response. Recommendations may resemble those for coeliac disease, for the diet to be strict and maintained, with no transgression. The degree of gluten cross contamination tolerated by people with NCGS is not clear but there is some evidence that they can present with symptoms even after consumption of small amounts. It is not yet known whether NCGS is a permanent or a transient condition. A trial of gluten reintroduction to observe any reaction after one–two years of strict gluten-free diet might be performed.

A subgroup of people with NCGS may not improve by eating commercially available gluten-free products, which are usually rich of preservatives and additives, because chemical additives (such as sulphites, glutamates, nitrates and benzoates) might have a role in evoking functional gastrointestinal symptoms of NCGS. These people may benefit from a diet with a low content of preservatives and additives.

NCGS, which is possibly immune-mediated, now appears to be more common than coeliac disease, with prevalence rates between 0.5 and 13% in the general population.

=== Wheat allergy ===
People can also experience adverse effects of wheat as result of a wheat allergy. Gastrointestinal symptoms of wheat allergy are similar to those of coeliac disease and non-coeliac gluten sensitivity, but there is a different interval between exposure to wheat and onset of symptoms. Other symptoms such as dermal reactions like as rashes or hyperpigmentation may also occur in some people. Wheat allergy has a fast onset (from minutes to hours) after the consumption of food containing wheat and could be anaphylaxis.

The management of wheat allergy consists of complete withdrawal of any food containing wheat and other gluten-containing cereals. Nevertheless, some people with wheat allergy can tolerate barley, rye or oats.

=== Gluten ataxia ===
A male with gluten ataxia: previous situation and evolution after three months of gluten-free diet.

Gluten ataxia is an autoimmune disease triggered by the ingestion of gluten. With gluten ataxia, damage takes place in the cerebellum, the balance center of the brain that controls coordination and complex movements like walking, speaking and swallowing, with loss of Purkinje cells. People with gluten ataxia usually present gait abnormality or incoordination and tremor of the upper limbs. Gaze-evoked nystagmus and other ocular signs of cerebellar dysfunction are common. Myoclonus, palatal tremor, and opsoclonus-myoclonus may also appear.

Early diagnosis and treatment with a gluten-free diet can improve ataxia and prevent its progression. The effectiveness of the treatment depends on the elapsed time from the onset of the ataxia until diagnosis, because the death of neurons in the cerebellum as a result of gluten exposure is irreversible.

Gluten ataxia accounts for 40% of ataxias of unknown origin and 15% of all ataxias. Less than 10% of people with gluten ataxia present any gastrointestinal symptom, yet about 40% have intestinal damage.

=== As a non-medical diet ===
Since the beginning of the 21st century, the gluten-free diet has become a fad diet.

The gluten-free diet has been advocated and followed by celebrities to lose weight and some professional athletes. There is no published experimental evidence to support that the gluten-free diet contributes to weight loss.

There is a consensus in the medical community that people should consult a physician before going on a gluten-free diet, so that a medical professional can accurately test for coeliac disease or any other gluten-related disorders.

=== Research ===
In a 2013 double-blind, placebo-controlled challenge (DBPC) by Biesiekierski et al. in a few people with irritable bowel syndrome, the authors found no difference between gluten or placebo groups and the concept of non-celiac gluten sensitivity as a syndrome was questioned. Nevertheless, this study had design errors and an incorrect selection of participants, and probably the reintroduction of both gluten and whey protein had a nocebo effect similar in all people, and this could have masked the true effect of gluten/wheat reintroduction.

In a 2015 double-blind placebo cross-over trial, small amounts of purified wheat gluten triggered gastrointestinal symptoms (such as abdominal bloating and pain) and extra-intestinal manifestations (such as foggy mind, depression and aphthous stomatitis) in self-reported non-celiac gluten sensitivity. Nevertheless, it remains elusive whether these findings specifically implicate gluten or other proteins present in gluten-containing cereals.

In a 2018 double-blind, crossover research study on 59 persons on a gluten-free diet with challenges of gluten, fructans or placebo, intestinal symptoms (specifically bloating) were borderline significantly higher after challenge with fructans, in comparison with gluten proteins (P=0.049). Although the differences between the three interventions was very small, the authors concluded that fructans (the specific type of FODMAP found in wheat) are more likely to be the cause of gastrointestinal symptoms of non-celiac gluten sensitivity, rather than gluten. For this previous study, experts recommend a low FODMAP diet instead of a gluten free diet for those patients suffering from functional gastrointestinal disorders as bloating. In addition, fructans used in the study were extracted from chicory root, so it remains to be seen whether the wheat fructans produce the same effect.

== Eating gluten-free ==
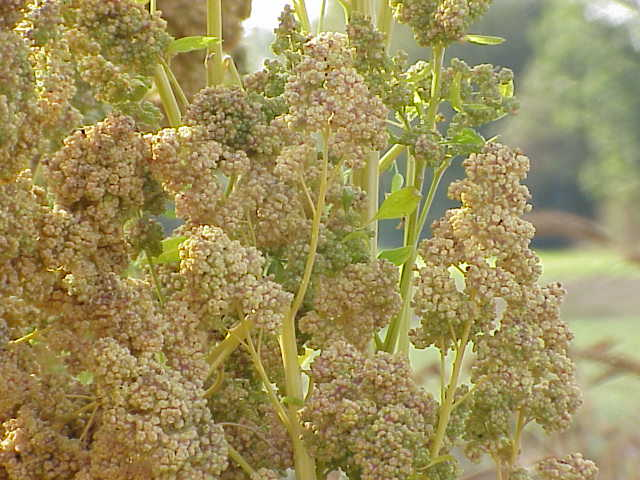
Quinoa is a pseudocereal that is gluten-free.

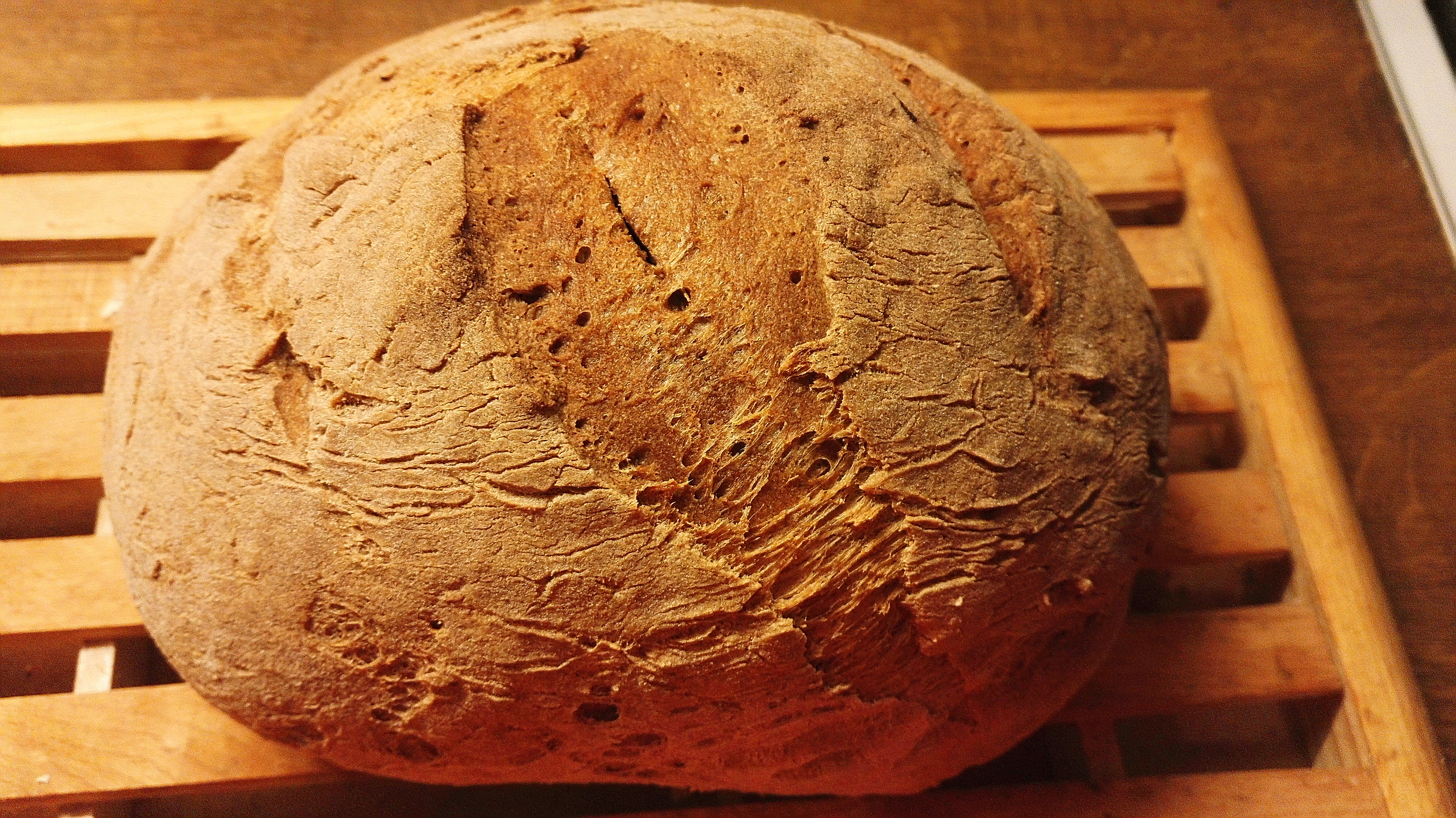
Gluten-free bread made of a mixture of flours like buckwheat flour, tapioca flour, millet flour and psyllium seed husks. Special flour mixes can be bought for bread-making purposes.

A gluten-free diet is a diet that strictly excludes gluten, proteins present in wheat (and all wheat varieties such as spelt and kamut), barley, rye, oat, and derivatives of these grains such as malt and triticale, and foods that may include them, or shared transportation or processing facilities with them. The inclusion of oats in a gluten-free diet remains controversial. Oat toxicity in people with gluten-related disorders depends on the oat cultivar consumed because the immunoreactivities of toxic prolamins are different among oat varieties. Furthermore, oats are frequently cross-contaminated with the other gluten-containing cereals. Pure oat (labelled as "pure oat" or "gluten-free oat") refers to oats uncontaminated with any of the other gluten-containing cereals. Some cultivars of pure oat could be a safe part of a gluten-free diet, requiring knowledge of the oat variety used in food products for a gluten-free diet. Nevertheless, the long-term effects of pure oats consumption are still unclear and further studies identifying the cultivars used are needed before making final recommendations on their inclusion in the gluten-free diet.

Other grains, although gluten-free in themselves, may contain gluten by cross-contamination with gluten-containing cereals during grain harvesting, transporting, milling, storing, processing, handling or cooking.

Processed foods commonly contain gluten as an additive (as emulsifiers, thickeners, gelling agents, fillers, and coatings), so they would need specific labeling. Unexpected sources of gluten are, among others, processed meat, vegetarian meat substitutes, reconstituted seafood, stuffings, butter, seasonings, marinades, dressings, confectionary, candies, and ice cream.

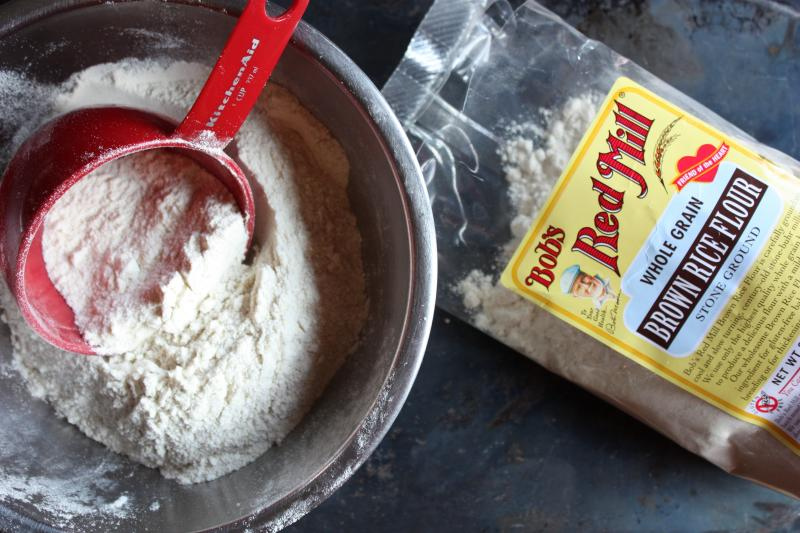
Gluten-free rice flour

Cross-contamination in the home is also a consideration for those who have gluten-related disorders. There can be many sources of cross-contamination, as for example when family members prepare gluten-free and gluten-containing foods on the same surfaces (countertops, tables, etc.) or share utensils that have not been cleaned after being used to prepare gluten-containing foods (cutting boards, colanders, cutlery, etc.), kitchen equipment (toaster, cupboards, etc.) or certain packaged foods (butter, peanut butter, etc.).

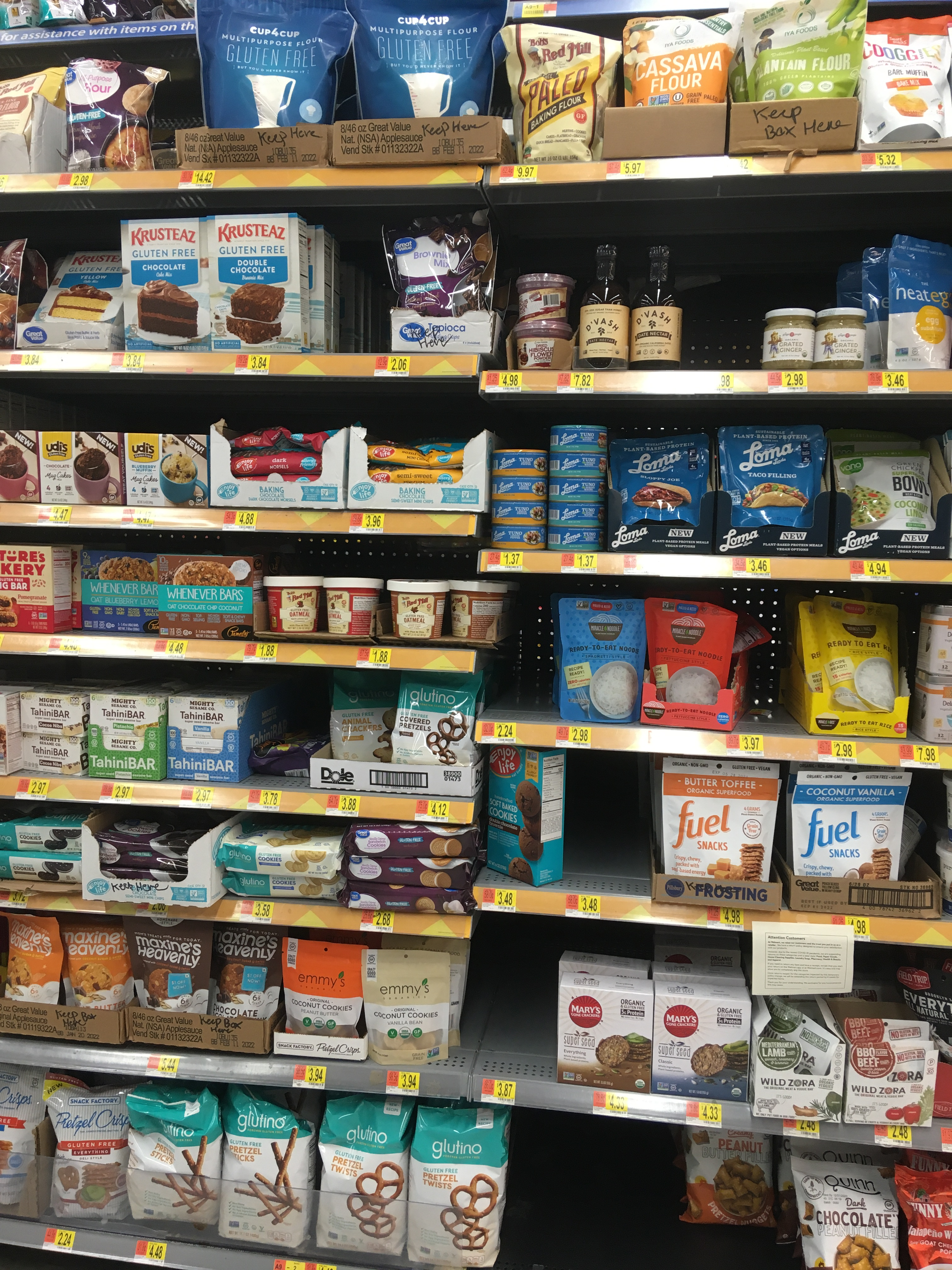
A grocery store's aisle of gluten-free food items.

Restaurants prove to be another source of cross-contamination for those following a strict gluten-free diet. A study conducted by Columbia University Medical Center found that 32% of foods labeled gluten-free at restaurants contain above 20 parts per million of gluten, meaning that it contains enough gluten that it is no longer considered gluten-free by the Codex Alimentarius. Cross-contamination occurs in these areas frequently because of a general lack of knowledge about the needed level of caution and the prevalence of gluten in restaurant kitchens. If cooks are unaware of the severity of their guest's diet restrictions or of the important practices needed to limit cross-contamination, they can unknowingly deliver contaminated food. However, some restaurants utilize a training program for their employees to educate them about the gluten-free diet. The accuracy of the training varies. One resource to find these safer restaurants is an app and website called "Find Me Gluten Free" that allows people following a gluten-free diet to rate the safety of different restaurants from their point of view and describe their experience to help future customers.

Easily locating gluten-free items is one of the main difficulties in following a gluten-free diet. To assist in this process, many restaurants and grocery stores choose to label food items. Restaurants often add a gluten-free section to their menu, or specifically mark gluten-free items with a symbol of some kind. Grocery stores often have a gluten-free aisle, or they will attach labels on the shelf underneath gluten-free items. Though the food is labeled gluten-free in this way, it does not necessarily mean that the food is safe for those with gluten-related disorders, as a compilation of studies suggest.

Medications and dietary supplements are made using excipients that may contain gluten.

=== Gluten-free food ===
The gluten-free diet includes naturally gluten-free food, such as meat, fish, seafood, eggs, milk and dairy products, nuts, legumes, fruit, vegetables, potatoes, pseudocereals (in particular amaranth, buckwheat, chia seed, quinoa), only certain cereal grains (corn, rice, sorghum), minor cereals (including fonio, Job's tears, millet, teff, called "minor" cereals as they are "less common and are only grown in a few small regions of the world"), some other plant products (arrowroot, mesquite flour, sago, tapioca) and products made from these gluten-free foods. Many Indian cuisine options, particularly South Indian cuisine, are gluten-free.

In recent years, scientists have developed a process that creates a gluten-free wheat flour. While it is a safe alternative flour option for people with celiac disease, it can still trigger allergic reactions in people with wheat allergies.

=== Risks ===
An unbalanced selection of food and an incorrect choice of gluten-free replacement products may lead to nutritional deficiencies. Replacing flour from wheat or other gluten-containing cereals with gluten-free flours in commercial products may lead to a lower intake of important nutrients, such as iron and B vitamins and a higher intake of sugars and saturated fats. Some gluten-free commercial replacement products are not enriched or fortified as their gluten-containing counterparts, and often have greater lipid / carbohydrate content. Children especially often over-consume these products, such as snacks and biscuits. These nutritional complications can be prevented by a correct dietary education. Pseudocereals (quinoa, amaranth, and buckwheat) and some minor cereals are healthy alternatives to these prepared products and have higher biological and nutritional value. Advances towards higher nutrition-content gluten-free bakery products, improved for example in terms of fiber content and glycemic index, have been made by using not exclusively corn starch or other starches to substitute for flour. In this aim, for example the dietary fibre inulin (which acts as a prebiotic) or quinoa or amaranth wholemeal have been as substitute for part of the flour. Similarly, xanthan gum can be used in up to gram quantities per serving in some gluten-free baked goods and can be fermented by specific microbiomes in the gastrointestinal tract. Such substitution has been found to also yield improved crust and texture of bread. It is recommended that anyone embarking on a gluten-free diet check with a registered dietitian to make sure they are getting the required amount of key nutrients like iron, calcium, fiber, thiamin, riboflavin, niacin and folate. Vitamins often contain gluten as a binding agent. Experts have advised that it is important to always read the content label of any product that is intended to be swallowed.

Up to 30% of people with known coeliac disease often continue having or redeveloping symptoms. Also, a lack of symptoms or negative blood antibodies levels are not reliable indicators of intestinal recuperation. Several studies show an incomplete recovery of small bowel despite a strict gluten-free diet. Depending on the study, somewhere between 17.5 - 92.1% of celiacs will achieve histological remission. This lack of recovery in a substantial subset of those with celiac disease is mainly caused by inadvertent exposure to gluten. People with poor basic education and understanding of the gluten-free diet often believe that they are strictly following the diet, but are making regular errors. In addition, some people often deliberately continue eating gluten because of limited availability, inferior taste, higher price, and inadequate labelling of gluten-free products. Poor compliance with the regimen is also influenced by age at diagnosis (adolescents), ignorance of the consequences of the lack of a strict treatment and certain psychological factors. Ongoing gluten intake can cause severe disease complications, such as various types of cancers (both intestinal and extra-intestinal) and osteoporosis.

== Regulation and labels ==
The term gluten-free is generally used to indicate a supposed harmless level of gluten for a person with celiac disease rather than a complete absence. The exact level at which gluten is harmless is uncertain and controversial.

The study cited by most jurisdictions in the development of their ppm standards is a 2007 randomized control trial by Catassi et al, which established the last known safe limit for persons with celiac disease to be 10 mg of gluten per day. This study involved celiac participants ingesting a pill containing either 0 mg (placebo), 10 mg or 50 mg of gluten on a daily basis for 90 days. Those in the 50 mg group had significant differences in their intestinal architecture as a result of the micro-challenge. On this basis, different jurisdictions have developed ppm (mg/kg) standards that should ensure that a person with celiac disease can consume a reasonable amount of packaged food before exceeding this daily limit.

Regulation of the label gluten-free varies by country. Most countries derive key provisions of their gluten-free labelling regulations from the Codex Alimentarius international standards for food labelling as a standard relating to the labelling of products as gluten-free. It only applies to foods that would normally contain gluten. Gluten-free is defined as 20 ppm (= 20 mg/kg) or less. It categorizes gluten-free food as:

- Food that is gluten-free by composition
- Food that has become gluten-free through special processing.
- Reduced gluten content, food which includes food products with between 20 and 100 ppm of gluten Reduced gluten content is left up to individual nations to more specifically define.

The Codex Standard suggests the enzyme-linked Immunoassay (ELISA) R5 Mendez method for indicating the presence of gluten, but allows for other relevant methods, such as DNA. The Codex Standard specifies that the gluten-free claim must appear in the immediate proximity of the name of the product, to ensure visibility.

There is no general agreement on the analytical method used to measure gluten in ingredients and food products. The ELISA method was designed to detect w-gliadins, but it suffered from the setback that it lacked sensitivity for barley prolamins. The use of highly sensitive assays is mandatory to certify gluten-free food products. The European Union, World Health Organization, and Codex Alimentarius require reliable measurement of the wheat prolamins, gliadins rather than all-wheat proteins.

=== Australia ===
The Australian government recommends that:

- food labelled gluten-free include no detectable gluten (<3ppm) oats or their products, cereals containing gluten that have been malted or their products
- food labelled low gluten claims such that the level of 20 mg gluten per 100 g of the food

=== Brazil ===
All food products must be clearly labelled whether they contain gluten or they are gluten-free. Since April 2016, the declaration of the possibility of cross-contamination is mandatory when the product does not intentionally add any allergenic food or its derivatives, but the Good Manufacturing Practices and allergen control measures adopted are not sufficient to prevent the presence of accidental trace amounts. When a product contains the warning of cross-contamination with wheat, rye, barley, oats and their hybridized strains, the warning "contains gluten" is mandatory. The law does not establish a gluten threshold for the declaration of its absence.

=== Canada ===
Label laws pertinent to the gluten-free diet are primarily regulated by the federal Food and Drugs Act and the Food and Drug Regulations, which come under this Act. The Food and Drugs Act applies only to packaged foods for human consumption that are traded inter-provincially and/or that are imported. The regulation of gluten ingredients and gluten-free claims in restaurants, cottage industry sales, or other non-packaged foods is a matter of provincial jurisdiction or common law.

Non-foods that are consumed like natural health products (supplements) have some regulations pertaining to gluten disclosure under the Natural Health Product Regulations and related guidance. While there are no explicit legislative provisions relating to gluten-free claims or gluten disclosure outside of this at the federal level, there could exist liability under more general consumer protection legislation where a misleading gluten-free claim is made, e.g. the Consumer Packaging and Labelling Act.

==== Ingredient declaration ====
The Food and Drug Regulations define gluten as including wheat, barley, rye, oats, and triticale. The definition of gluten also includes protein fractions of the aforementioned grains. Where gluten is an intentional ingredient in a product, it must be declared in the ingredient list and/or in a "contains" statement on the package. The specific source of the gluten (wheat, barley, rye, oats etc.) must also be declared.

The use of precautionary statements ("may contain") for the purposes of disclosing unintentional cross-contamination from gluten at any ppm level is optional.

==== Gluten-free claims ====
The Food and Drug Regulations (s B.24.018) stipulate that packaged foods being represented as gluten-free must not contain "any" gluten protein ingredients, including fragments. The Regulations do not specify any ppm level and do not define "protein fragment". Guidance (soft law) from both Health Canada and the CFIA provides insight into the enforcement of B.24.018.

Health Canada's position is that foods that contain less than 20 ppm of gluten from cross-contamination meet the health and safety intent of the word "any" used in B.24.018.

The CFIA's guidance specifies that gluten ingredients can appear in products with a gluten-free claim if they are sufficiently processed to remove gluten proteins, such as distilled alcohol (e.g. vodka derived from wheat). Fermentation is not considered to be a process that removes gluten. The implication of this is that ingredients such as barley malt (often used in beer) are not permissible in gluten-free products irrespective of the ppm level. This is also affirmed in the CFIA's guidance on enforcement of gluten-free claims.

As a result of a 2015 Market Authorization, oats are permitted in gluten-free foods as long as they are less than 20 ppm from cross-contamination. To comply with the Market Authorization, the oats must be described as "gluten-free" in the ingredient list.

=== European Union ===
The EU European Commission delineates the categories as:

- gluten-free: 20 ppm or less of gluten
- very low gluten foodstuffs: 20-100ppm gluten.

All foods containing gluten as an ingredient must be labelled accordingly as gluten is defined as one of the 14 recognized EU allergens.

=== United States ===
Until 2012 anyone could use the gluten-free claim with no repercussion. In 2008, Wellshire Farms chicken nuggets labelled gluten-free were purchased and samples were sent to a food allergy laboratory where they were found to contain gluten. After this was reported in the Chicago Tribune, the products continued to be sold. The manufacturer has since replaced the batter used in its chicken nuggets.

The U.S. first addressed gluten-free labelling in the 2004 Food Allergen Labeling and Consumer Protection Act (FALCPA). The Alcohol and Tobacco Tax and Trade Bureau published interim rules and proposed mandatory labelling for alcoholic products in 2006. The FDA issued their Final Rule on August 5, 2013. When a food producer voluntarily chooses to use a gluten-free claim for a product, the food bearing the claim in its labelling may not contain:

- an ingredient that is a gluten-containing grain
- an ingredient that is derived from a gluten-containing grain that has not been processed to remove gluten
- an ingredient that is derived from a gluten-containing grain, that has been processed to remove gluten but results in the presence of 20 ppm or more gluten in the food. Any food product claiming to be gluten-free and also bearing the term "wheat" in its ingredient list or in a separate "Contains wheat" statement, must also include the language "*the wheat has been processed to allow this food to meet the FDA requirements for gluten-free foods," in close proximity to the ingredient statement.

Any food product that inherently does not contain gluten may use a gluten-free label where any unavoidable presence of gluten in the food bearing the claim in its labelling is below 20 ppm gluten.

== See also ==
- 2010s in food
- Gluten-free, casein-free diet
- List of diets
- Paleolithic diet
- Specific carbohydrate diet
