= Specific carbohydrate diet =

Restrictive diet which limits the use of complex carbohydrates

The specific carbohydrate diet (SCD) is a restrictive diet originally created to manage celiac disease; it limits the use of complex carbohydrates (disaccharides and polysaccharides). Monosaccharides are allowed, and various foods including fish, aged cheese and honey are included. Prohibited foods include cereal grains, potatoes and lactose-containing dairy products. It is a gluten-free diet since no grains are permitted.

== Origins ==
In 1924, Sidney V. Haas (1870–1964) described the first SCD for the treatment of children with celiac disease; this was known as the banana diet. Haas described a trial with 10 children; all 8 children treated with bananas went into remission, and the two control children died. The banana SCD was the cornerstone of celiac therapy for decades until bread shortages in the Netherlands caused by World War II caused children with celiac disease to improve, which led to the isolation of wheat proteins, not starches, as the cause of celiac disease. Before the banana SCD, one out of four children with celiac died. After more research, he described the SCD as a treatment for celiac disease and inflammatory bowel disease (IBD) in his 1951 medical textbook The Management of Celiac Disease; Haas never accepted the finding that wheat gluten was the damaging part of wheat; he insisted it was starch and called the discovery about a gluten a "disservice."

The diet was later re-popularized by biochemist Elaine Gottschall, the mother of one of Haas's patients, in her 1996 book Breaking the Vicious Cycle. Gottschall's daughter was reported to have been cured of ulcerative colitis in two years by SCD. Gottschall described the theory of how restricting diet might reduce gut inflammation associated with various medical conditions. Gottschall asserted that the diet could "cure" a number of medical conditions without providing data. Gottschall advocated using SCD to treat Crohn's disease, ulcerative colitis, diverticulitis, cystic fibrosis, chronic diarrhea, and autism.

== Unconfirmed claims ==
The claims that the SCD is beneficial for children with autism are based on the supposition they have too much harmful bacteria in their gut. While limited evidence suggests the SCD can be beneficial, there is a concern the restrictive nature of the diet may cause nutritional deficiencies. Parents adopting the SCD for their children are at risk of experiencing guilt when their expectations of improvement are dashed. The SCD is one of many unevidenced treatments offered for children with special needs that have the characteristic signs of being pseudoscientific.

A 2013 review on SCD and other exclusion diets concluded: "However, we lack large prospective controlled trials to provide the dietary recommendations patients’ desire. Taken together, studies of exclusive enteral nutrition, exclusion diets, and semi-vegetarian diets suggest that minimizing exposure of the intestinal lumen to selected food items may prolong the remission state of patients with inflammatory bowel disease. Even less evidence exists for the efficacy of the SCD, FODMAP, or Paleo diet. " It also said that the diet risks imposition of an undue financial burden and potentially causes malnutrition.

As of 2017 there was preliminary evidence that the SCD may help relieve the symptoms of adults with inflammatory bowel disease.

The Gut and Psychology Syndrome Diet (GAPS Diet) is an even more restrictive variant of the SCD, devised by a Russian neurologist. The diet is promoted with claims it can treat a wide variety of conditions including autism, schizophrenia and epilepsy. Like the SCD, claims of the diet's usefulness for children with autism are not supported by scientific studies. Harriet Hall has described the GAPS diet as "a mishmash of half-truths, pseudoscience, imagination, and untested claims", and Quackwatch includes the GAPS Diet in its Index of questionable treatments.

== See also ==
- Low-carbohydrate diet – Diets restricting carbohydrate consumption
- DASH diet – Diet to control hypertension
- List of diets
