= Gottschall =

Gottschall is a German surname meaning "God's echo". Notable people with the surname include:

- Elaine Gottschall (1921–2005), American proponent of specific carbohydrate diet
- Joan B. Gottschall (born 1947), United States federal judge
- Jonathan Gottschall (born 1972), American literary scholar
- Robert Gottschall (1915–2005), American actor, a/k/a Robert Shaw or Bob Shaw
- Rudolf von Gottschall (1823–1909), German poet and dramatist
- Hermann von Gottschall (1862–1933), German chess master, son of Rudolf
- Zsófia Gottschall (born 1978), Hungarian biathlete and skier

== See also ==
- Gottschalk
