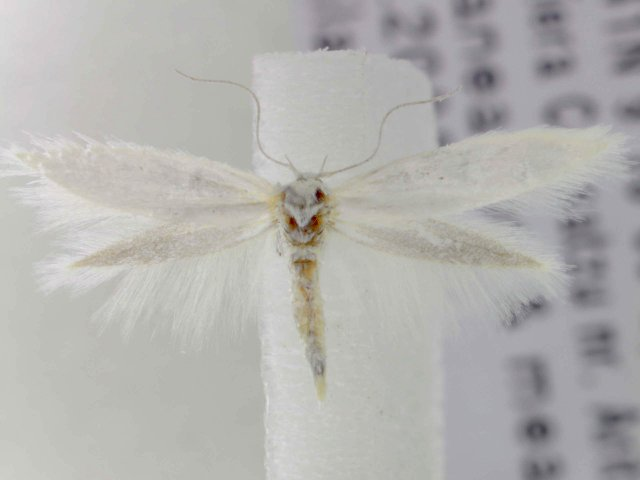

Scientific classification
- Domain: Eukaryota
- Kingdom: Animalia
- Phylum: Arthropoda
- Class: Insecta
- Order: Lepidoptera
- Family: Elachistidae
- Genus: Elachista
- Species: E. nuraghella

Binomial name
- Elachista nuraghella Amsel, 1951

= Elachista nuraghella =

Species of moth

Elachista nuraghella is a moth of the family Elachistidae. It is found on the Iberian Peninsula, Sardinia, Sicily, Malta and in France, Italy, and Austria. It is also found in Algeria and Tunisia. Records from Bulgaria, Greece, and Turkey refer to Elachista grotenfelti.

Adults are a single colour, white or creamy white, with variably paler or darker grey hindwings.

The larvae feed on Dasypyrum villosum.
