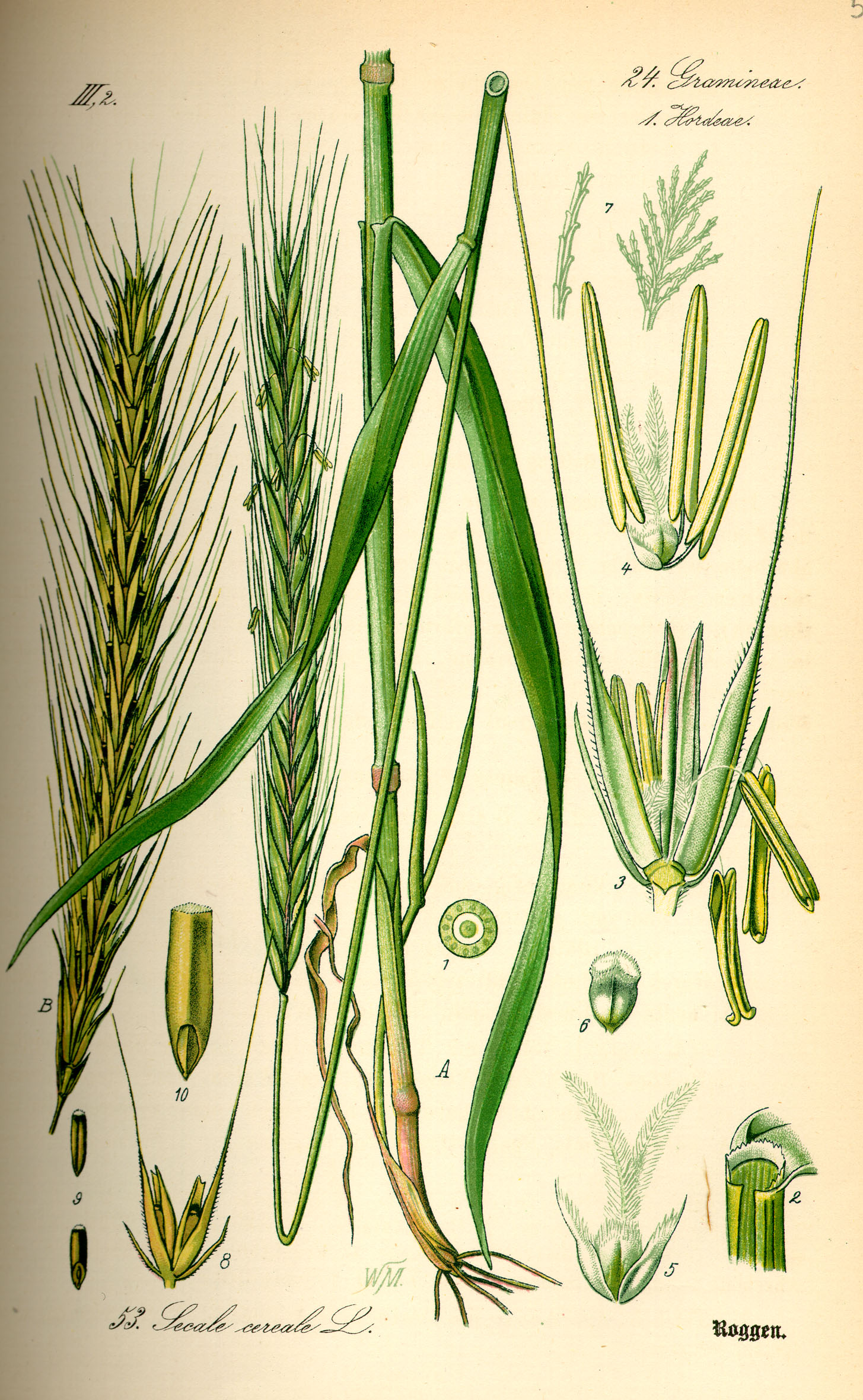

Scientific classification
- Kingdom: Plantae
- Clade: Embryophytes
- Clade: Tracheophytes
- Clade: Angiosperms
- Clade: Monocots
- Clade: Commelinids
- Order: Poales
- Family: Poaceae
- Subfamily: Pooideae
- Supertribe: Triticodae
- Tribe: Triticeae
- Genus: Secale; L.

= Secale =

Genus of grasses

Secale is a genus of the grass tribe Triticeae, which is related to barley (Hordeum) and wheat (Triticum). The genus includes cultivated species such as rye (Secale cereale) as well as weedy and wild rye species. The best-known species of the genus is the cultivated rye, S. cereale, which is grown as a grain and forage crop. Wild and weedy rye species help provide a huge gene pool that can be used for improvement of the cultivated rye.

The genus Secale includes the cultivated rye and four to eleven wild species depending on the species criteria used. Commonly recognized species of the genus are the annuals, S. cereale, S. vavilovii Grouch, and S. sylvestre and perennial S. strictum (syn. S. montanum). Secale cereale includes cultivated rye and other weedy rye types. Secale strictum is a group that includes distinct geographical isolates. Secale vavilovii is the most different of the genus as it separated early from the other species in the genus.

== Evolutionary history ==
Secale strictum subsp. africanum, Secale strictum anatolicum, Secale sylvestre, and Secale strictum subsp. strictum evolved in succession from a common ancestor of Secale after geographic separation and genetic differentiation. The annual weedy rye evolved from S. strictum subspecies strictum was domesticated to cultivated rye. Data suggests division of the genus into three species: the annual wild species S. sylvestre, the perennial wild species S. strictum including many subspecies, and S. cereale with cultivated and weedy rye subspecies.

Secale sylvestre is believed to be the most distant relative of S. cereale and most closely related to other outgroups. This is seen through lower rates of rye simple sequence repeat (SSR) sequences compared to other members of the genus Secale. Secale sylvestre is, therefore, the most ancient Secale species. Following separation of S. sylvestre from other taxa of the genus, perennial taxa also separated. Secale montanum descended directly from S. sylvestre and other perennial taxa originated from S. montanum. Perennial taxa are the progenitors of annual taxa. All annual taxa are most closely related and form a monophyletic group.

== Crop development ==
Understanding wild plant species is becoming important in the development of new crops. The wild perennial rye (Secale montanum) is the ancestor of the cultivated rye (Secale cereale). Many forms of perennial rye are found in Turkey including Secale montatum Guss var. anatolicum Boiss and Secale montanum Guss var. vavilovi Grossh. These perennial species usually have large stature, high frost resistance, strong tillering ability, and tolerance to poor soils and drought. Faults of the ryes that need to be overcome include small and sparse leaves and breaking peduncles.

ACE-1 perennial cereal (PC) rye has been developed in Canada as a new crop for silage and green-feed production. The rye was developed by first crossing Secale cereale L. (rye) and Secale montanum (perennial wild rye), then backcrossing the produced F1 generation with Secale cereale L., and selecting for the perennial types. Beneficial characteristics of the crop include early growth in spring, competing well with weeds, and producing significant regrowth for silage or pasture. PC rye also has an extensive root system that can be used to improve soil tilth and prevent soil erosion during the fall and winter months. The newly developed crop has not shown significant susceptibility to disease. The new cultivar is currently being further evaluated to test for adaptation and yield potential. These characteristics could make this species an attractive crop to be used in the future.

Species

- Secale africanum Stapf – Cape Province of South Africa
- Secale anatolicum Boiss. – Greece, Bulgaria, Turkey, Caucasus, Iraq, Iran
- Secale cereale L. – Turkey; widely cultivated and naturalized in many places
- Secale ciliatiglume (Boiss.) Grossh. – Turkey, Iraq, Iran
- Secale iranicum Kobyl. – Iran
- Secale montanum Guss. – from Spain + Morocco to Pakistan
- Secale segetale (Zhuk.) Roshev. – Central Asia, Xinjiang, Kashmir, Pakistan, Afghanistan, Iran, Iraq, Caucasus
- Secale sylvestre Host – Balkans, Hungary, Ukraine, European Russia, Caucasus, Central Asia
- Secale vavilovii Grossh. – Turkey, Caucasus, Iraq, Iran

formerly included

see Agropyron Brachypodium Dasypyrum Eremopyrum

- Secale barbatum – Eremopyrum orientale
- Secale bromoides – Brachypodium distachyon
- Secale hirtum – Eremopyrum orientale
- Secale orientale – Eremopyrum orientale
- Secale prostratum – Eremopyrum triticeum
- Secale pumilum – Agropyron cristatum
- Secale pungens – Eremopyrum bonaepartis
- Secale reptans – Eremopyrum triticeum
- Secale villosum – Dasypyrum villosum
