= Secale anatolicum =

Conservation status
- Least Concern (IUCN 3.1)

Scientific classification
- Kingdom: Plantae
- Clade: Tracheophytes
- Clade: Angiosperms
- Clade: Monocots
- Clade: Commelinids
- Order: Poales
- Family: Poaceae
- Subfamily: Pooideae
- Genus: Secale
- Species: S. anatolicum

Binomial name
- Secale anatolicum Boiss.

Synonyms
- List: Secale anatolicum var. daralagesii (Tumananow) N.R.Ivanov & Yakovlev; Secale cereale var. anatolicum (Boiss.) Regel; Secale cereale var. perennans Grossh.; Secale daralagesii Tumananow; Secale montanum subsp. anatolicum (Boiss.) Tzvelev; Secale montanum var. anatolicum (Boiss.) Boiss.; Secale montanum subsp. rhodopaeum (Delip.) Kožuharov; Secale rhodopaeum Delip.; Secale strictum subsp. anatolicum (Boiss.) K.Hammer

Species of plant

Secale anatolicum is a species of flowering plant in the grass family Poaceae. It is native to southwestern Bulgaria, southern Greece, Turkey, the Transcaucasus, Iraq, and Iran. A perennial, it is found in a variety of subtropical habitats, including mountain slopes, cliffs, grasslands, scrublands, and forests at elevations from 700 to 2,300 m (2,300 to 7,500 ft). It has been assessed as Least Concern. Although there is taxonomic uncertainty about species delimitations within the genus Secale, this taxon is considered a crop wild relative of rye (Secale cereale).
