= AC Hazlet rye =

Variety of flowering plants

AC Hazlet rye is a fall rye variety that was developed by Canadian breeder Dr. Grant Macleod of Agriculture and Agri-Food Canada. AC Hazlet rye is a medium-sized fall rye variety whose seed crop is produced and distributed through SeCan, a not-for-profit Canadian commodity crop seed distribution cooperative, and is then grown on a commodity scale in Canada

== Crop production statistics ==
=== Compared to older varieties ===
In field evaluations, this fall-planted rye variety showed very good resistance to both lodging and shattering. When compared to other winter and fall rye varieties produced in Canada, AC Hazlet rye had higher or similar yields and higher kernel weights over the varieties it was evaluated against. It also performed very well against winter damage and showed superior winter hardiness traits.

=== Comparing crops ===
Fall rye grows more quickly, matures earlier than other "wheat cereals", is the hardiest and most disease-resistant crop among the wheat cereals, and it is commonly grown under conditions where other cereal crops fail. Fall rye is very drought tolerant, more so than wheat or oats, but thrives best in a moist growing environment. When compared to other cover crops, rye is superior in all characteristics associated with cover crops

== Production of AC Hazlet rye seeds ==
This rye seed variety is produced and sold through SeCan. SeCan contracts with various Canadian farmers to produce the AC Hazlet rye seed crop.
