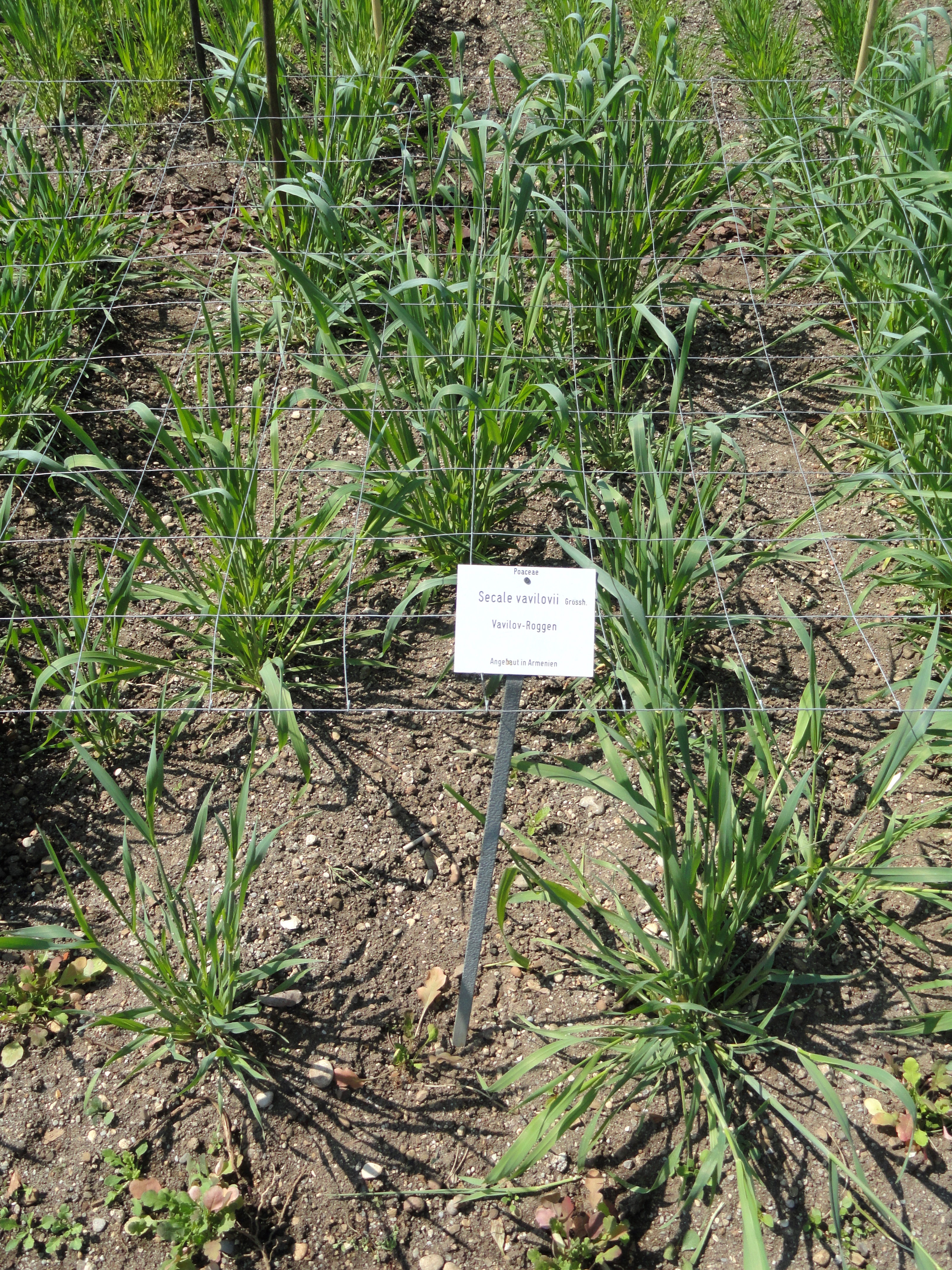
- At the Botanical Garden Munich-Nymphenburg

Scientific classification
- Kingdom: Plantae
- Clade: Embryophytes
- Clade: Tracheophytes
- Clade: Angiosperms
- Clade: Monocots
- Clade: Commelinids
- Order: Poales
- Family: Poaceae
- Subfamily: Pooideae
- Genus: Secale
- Species: S. vavilovii

Binomial name
- Secale vavilovii Grossh.

Synonyms
- Secale cereale subsp. vavilovii (Grossh.) Kobyl.; Secale cereale var. vavilovii (Grossh.) Mayss.; Secale leptorhachis H.Scholz & Parolly; Secale transcaucasicum Grossh.

= Secale vavilovii =

Species of plant

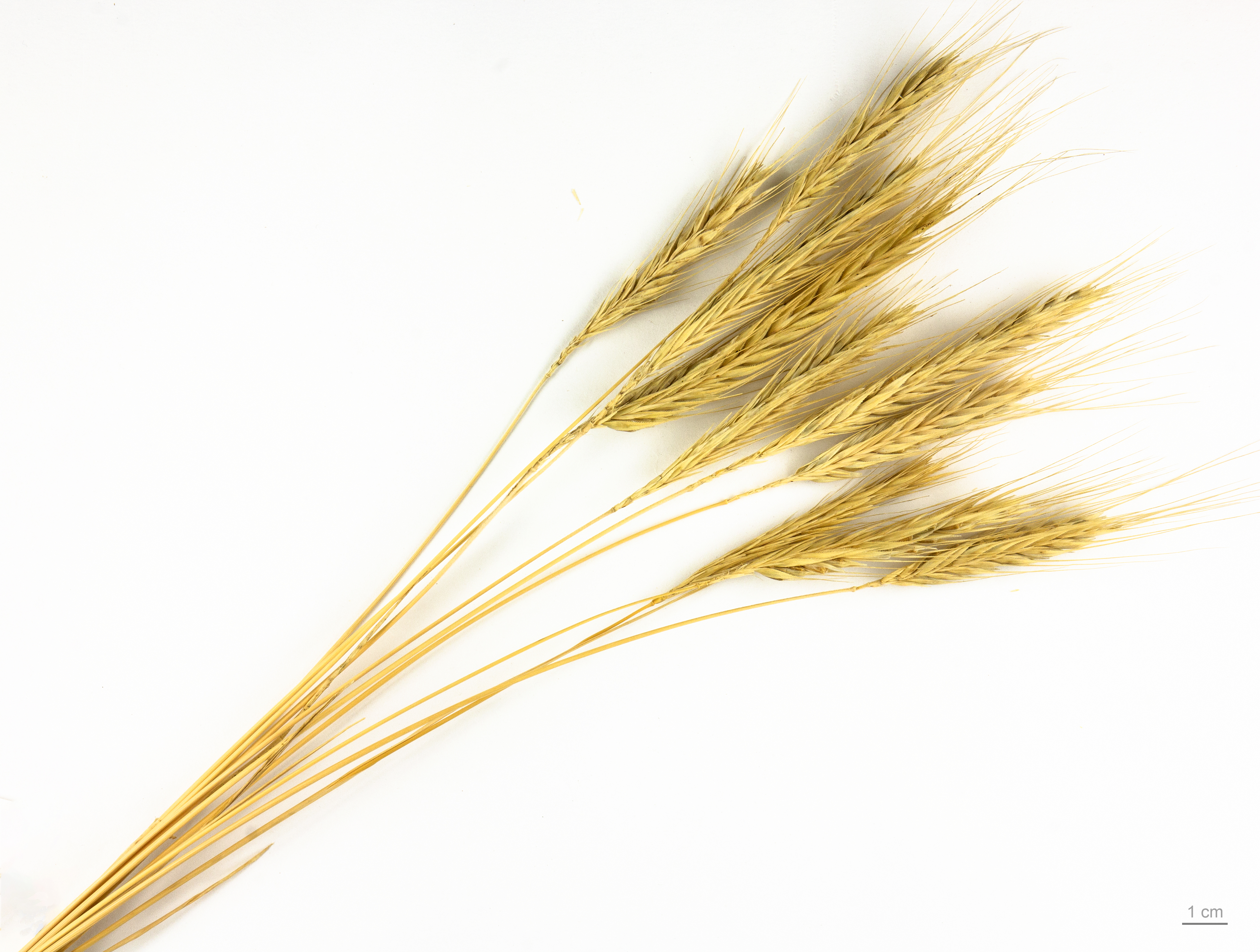
Secale vavilovii (MHNT)

Secale vavilovii is a species of grass (family Poaceae), native to Turkey, the Transcaucasus, Iraq, and Iran. An annual, it is a crop wild relative of rye (Secale cereale) and is being studied for its resistance to Fusarium ear blight and Septoria leaf blotch.
