= Secale africanum =

Conservation status
- Critically Endangered (IUCN 3.1)

Scientific classification
- Kingdom: Plantae
- Clade: Tracheophytes
- Clade: Angiosperms
- Clade: Monocots
- Clade: Commelinids
- Order: Poales
- Family: Poaceae
- Subfamily: Pooideae
- Genus: Secale
- Species: S. africanum

Binomial name
- Secale africanum Stapf

Synonyms
- Secale montanum subsp. africanum (Stapf) Kobyl.; Secale strictum subsp. africanum (Stapf) K.Hammer

Species of plant

Secale africanum, the African rye, is a species of flowering plant in the family Poaceae. It is native to the Cape Provinces. An annual or perennial tufted grass reaching 1 m (3 ft), it is found only in the Roggeveld (the ryefield) at elevations from 1,400 to 1,900 m (4,600 to 6,200 ft). Highly palatable to livestock, it has been assessed as Critically Endangered due to overgrazing.
