= Secale segetale =

Scientific classification
- Kingdom: Plantae
- Clade: Tracheophytes
- Clade: Angiosperms
- Clade: Monocots
- Clade: Commelinids
- Order: Poales
- Family: Poaceae
- Subfamily: Pooideae
- Genus: Secale
- Species: S. segetale

Binomial name
- Secale segetale (Zhuk.) Roshev.

Synonyms
- List: Secale afghanicum (Vavilov) Roshev.; Secale ancestrale var. afghanicum (Vavilov) N.R.Ivanov & Yakovlev; Secale ancestrale var. dighoricum (Vavilov) N.R.Ivanov & Yakovlev; Secale cereale subsp. afghanicum (Vavilov) K.Hammer; Secale cereale var. afghanicum Vavilov; Secale cereale var. dighoricum (Vavilov) Jaaska; Secale cereale subsp. dighoricum Vavilov; Secale cereale subsp. segetale Zhuk.; Secale dighoricum (Vavilov) Roshev.; Secale segetale var. afghanicum (Vavilov) Tzvelev; Secale segetale subsp. afghanicum (Vavilov) Bondarenko ex Korovina; Secale segetale subsp. dighoricum (Vavilov) Tzvelev; Secale segetale var. dighoricum (Vavilov) Tzvelev; Secale vavilovii subsp. afghanicum (Vavilov) Tzvelev; Secale vavilovii subsp. segetale (Zhuk.) Tzvelev

Species of plant

Secale segetale, the weed rye, is a species of flowering plant in the family Poaceae. It has a nearly Irano-Turanian distribution; the Caucasus, Iraq, Iran, Central Asia, Afghanistan, Pakistan, the western Himalayas, and Xinjiang. An annual reaching 100 cm (39 in), it is typically found as a weed in wheat fields. It can be distinguished from rye (Secale cereale) by its fragile rachis.
