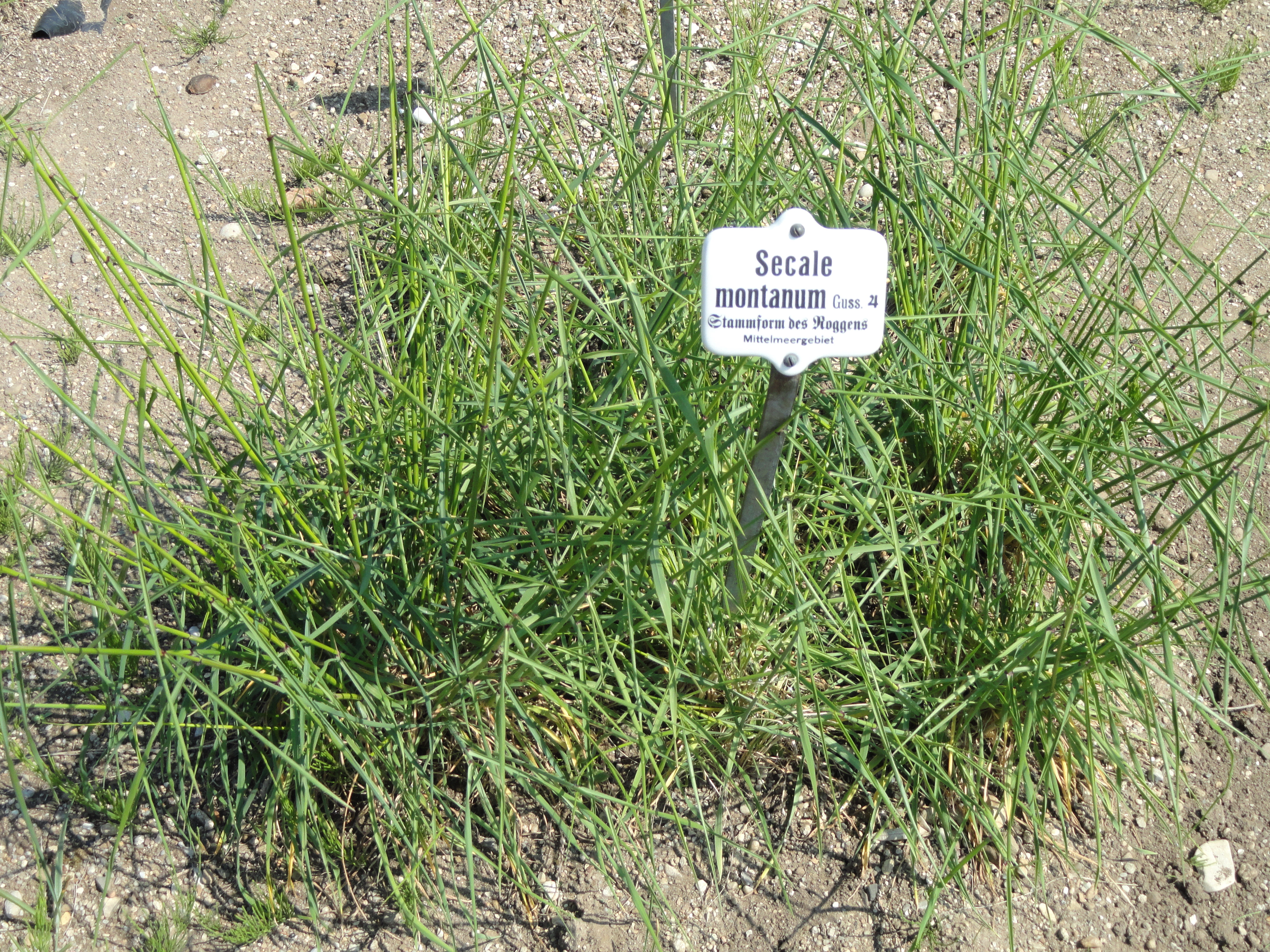
- Secale montanum at the Botanical Garden Munich-Nymphenburg

Scientific classification
- Kingdom: Plantae
- Clade: Embryophytes
- Clade: Tracheophytes
- Clade: Angiosperms
- Clade: Monocots
- Clade: Commelinids
- Order: Poales
- Family: Poaceae
- Subfamily: Pooideae
- Genus: Secale
- Species: S. montanum

Binomial name
- Secale montanum Guss.

Synonyms
- List: Frumentum secale E.H.L.Krause; Secale chaldicum Fed.; Secale dalmaticum Vis.; Secale kuprijanovii Grossh.; Secale kuprijanovii subsp. ciscaucasicum N.R.Ivanov & Yakovlev; Secale kuprijanovii subsp. transcaucasicum N.R.Ivanov & Yakovlev; Secale montanum subsp. chaldicum (Fed.) Tzvelev; Secale montanum subsp. kuprijanovii (Grossh.) Tzvelev; Secale strictum (C.Presl) C.Presl; Secale strictum subsp. chaldicum (Fed.) H.Scholz; Secale strictum subsp. kuprijanovii (Grossh.) K.Hammer

= Secale montanum =

Species of plant

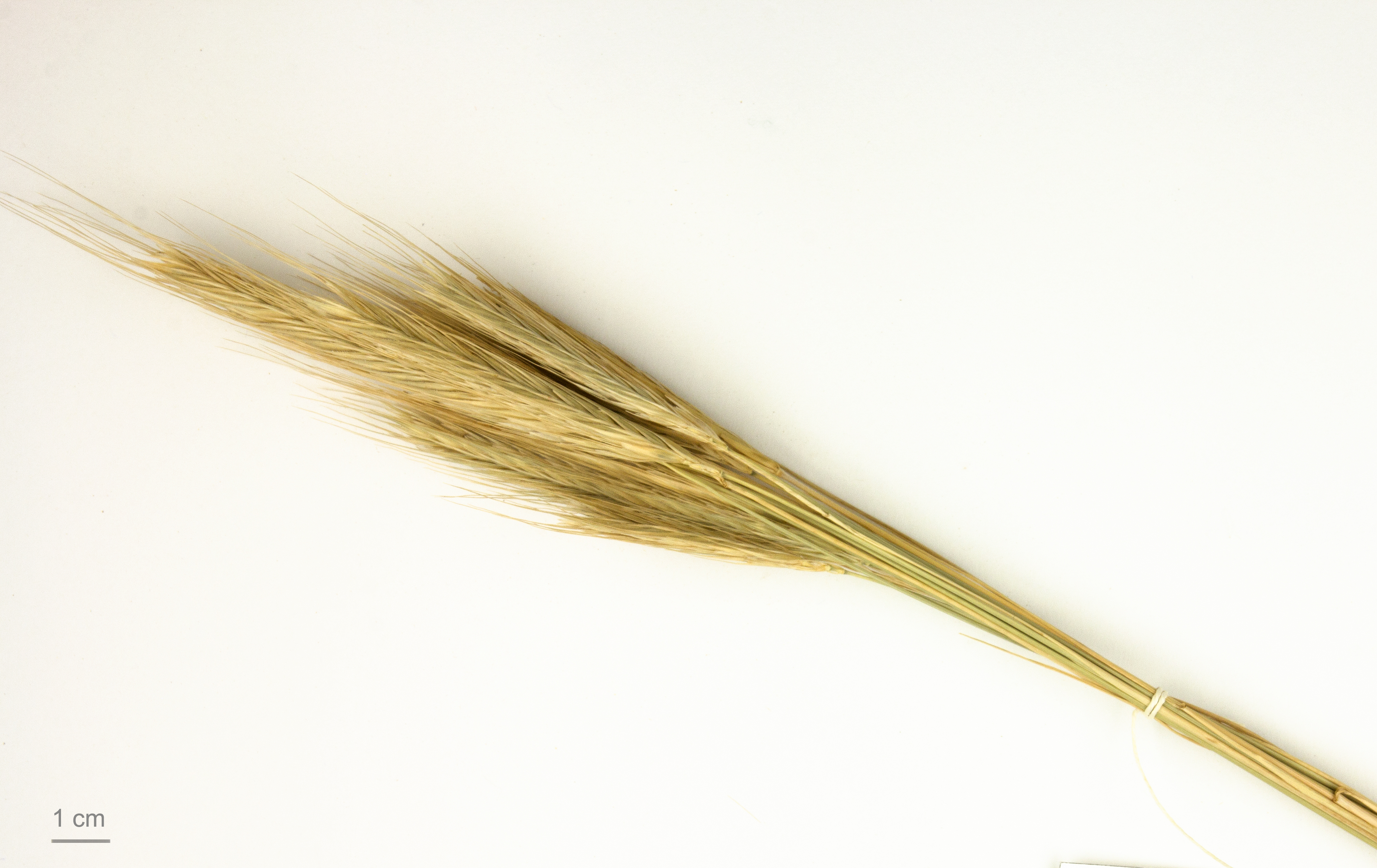
Secale strictum MHNT

Secale montanum, wild perennial rye, is a species in the rye genus Secale native to the Mediterranean, the Middle East, the Caucasus region, and eastwards through Iran to Pakistan. It is a short-lived, self-fertile perennial. It is thought to be the ultimate parent of domesticated rye (Secale cereale), and crosses with S. cereale have had some success in creating fodder cultivars. Some authorities consider the synonym Secale strictum C.Presl. to have priority.
