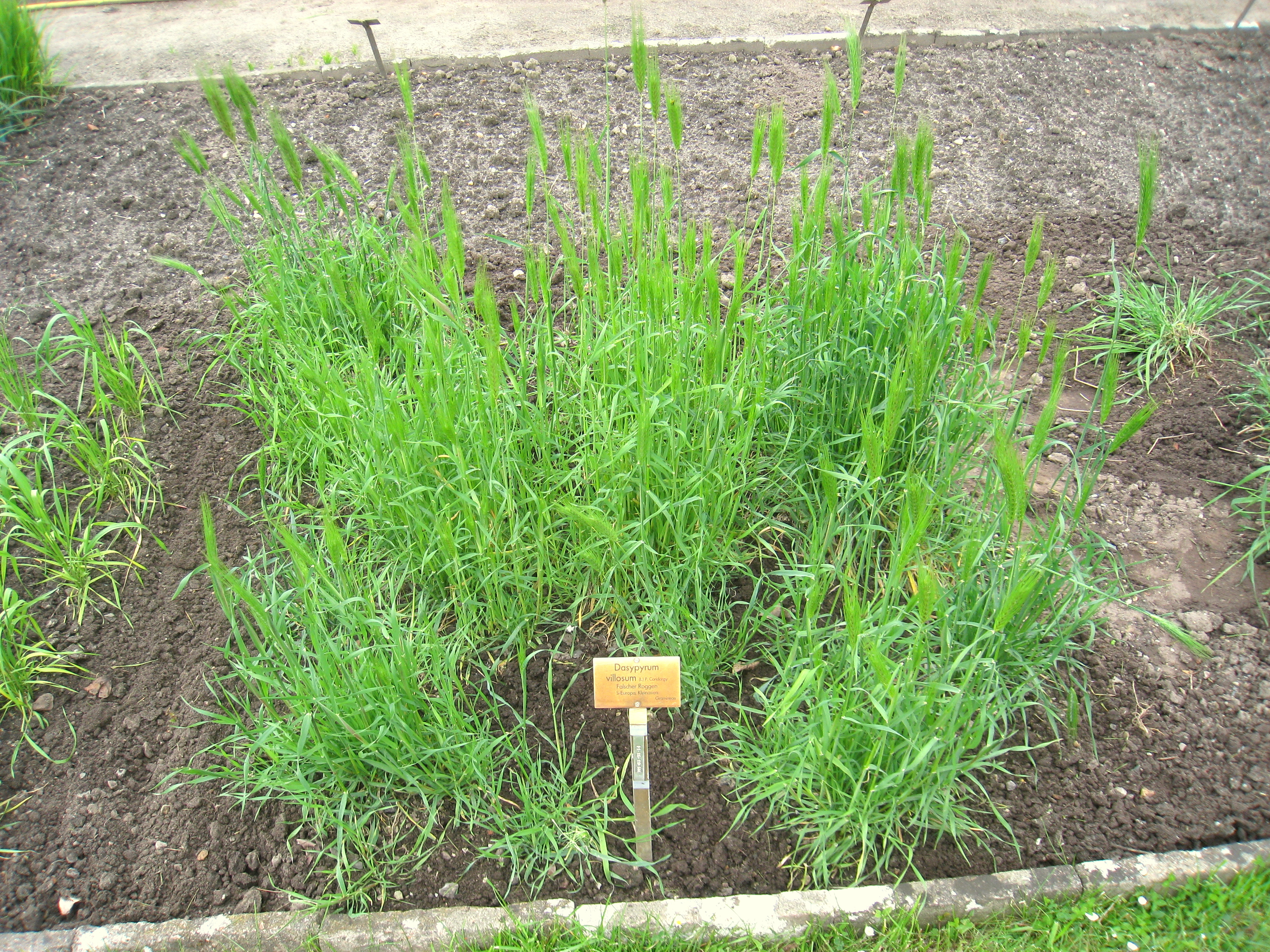
- Dasypyrum villosum

Scientific classification
- Kingdom: Plantae
- Clade: Tracheophytes
- Clade: Angiosperms
- Clade: Monocots
- Clade: Commelinids
- Order: Poales
- Family: Poaceae
- Subfamily: Pooideae
- Supertribe: Triticodae
- Tribe: Triticeae
- Genus: Dasypyrum (Coss. & Durieu) T.Durand 1888 not (Coss. & Durieu) Maire 1942

Type species
- Triticum villosum (L.) M. Bieb.

Synonyms
- Triticum sect. Dasypyrum Coss. & Durieu; Dasypyrum (Coss. & Durieu) Maire 1942, illegitimate homonym + homotypic synonym of Dasypyrum (Coss. & Durieu) T.Durand 1888; Haynaldia Schur 1866, not Schulzer 1866 nor Kanitz 1877 nor Pant. 1889; superfluous homotypic synonym of Dasypyrum (Coss. & Durieu) T.Durand 1888; Pseudosecale (Godr.) Degen

= Dasypyrum =

Genus of grasses

Dasypyrum is a genus of Eurasian and North African plants in the grass family, native to the basins of the Mediterranean, Black, and Caspian Seas.

== Species ==
Species include:

- Dasypyrum hordeaceum (Hack.) P.Candargy - Greece, Morocco, Algeria
- Dasypyrum villosum (L.) Borbás, Term. - Balearic Islands, Corsica, Sardinia, France, Italy, Greece, Balkans, Ukraine, Crimea, Turkmenistan, Caucasus, Turkey

=== Formerly included ===
Species formerly included:

- Dasypyrum sinaicum — Eremopyrum bonaepartis
