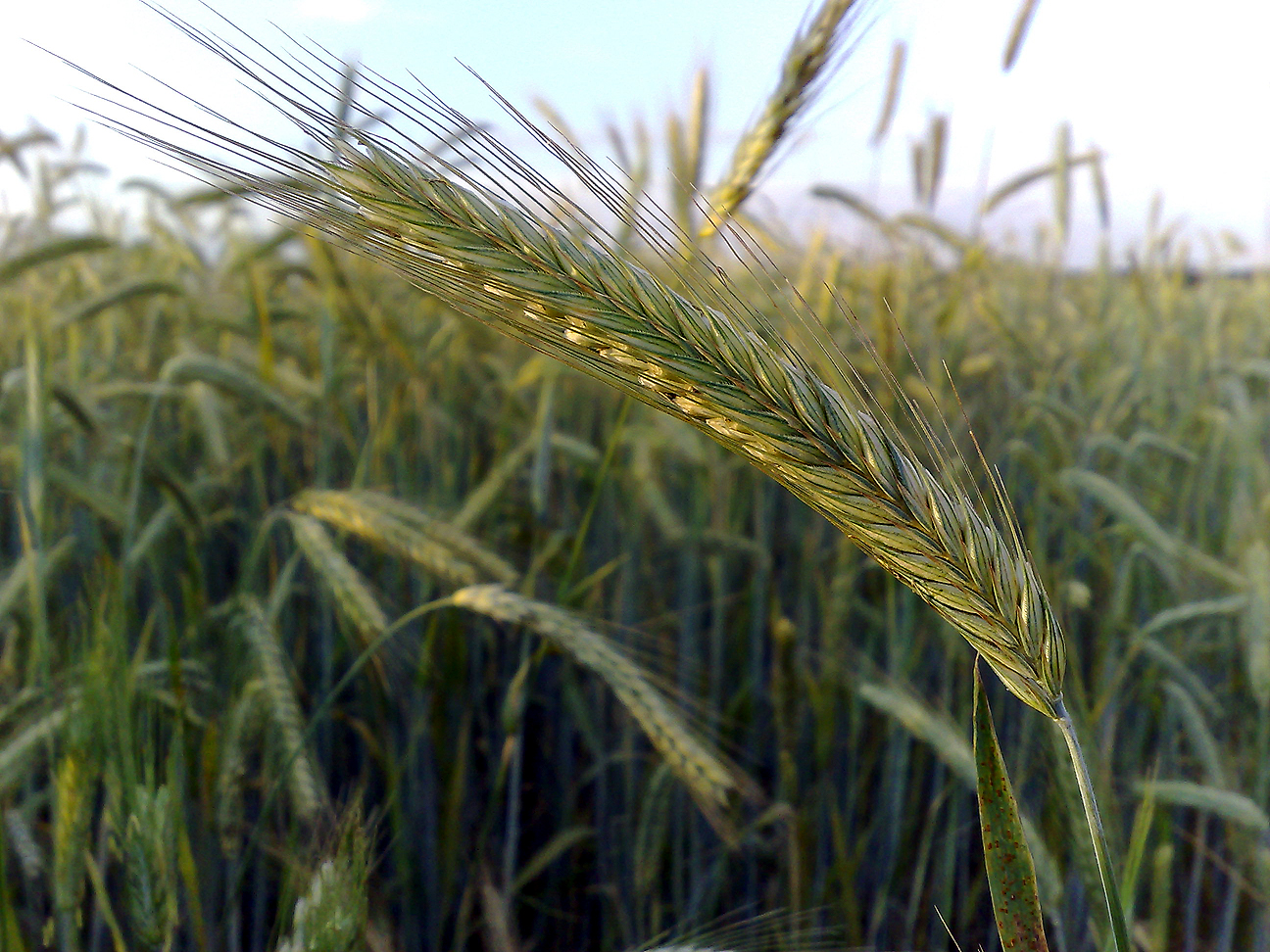

Scientific classification
- Kingdom: Plantae
- Clade: Tracheophytes
- Clade: Angiosperms
- Clade: Monocots
- Clade: Commelinids
- Order: Poales
- Family: Poaceae
- Subfamily: Pooideae
- Genus: Secale
- Species: S. cereale

Binomial name
- Secale cereale L.

Synonyms
- Secale fragile M.Bieb.

= Rye =

Species of grain

Rye (Secale cereale) is a grass grown extensively as a grain, a cover crop and a forage crop. It is grown principally in an area from Eastern and Northern Europe into Russia. It is much more tolerant of cold weather and poor soil than other cereals, making it useful in those regions; its vigorous growth suppresses weeds and provides abundant forage for animals early in the year. It is a member of the wheat tribe (Triticeae) which includes the cereals wheat and barley. It is likely that rye arrived in Europe as a secondary crop, meaning that it was a minor admixture in wheat as a result of Vavilovian mimicry, and was only later cultivated in its own right.

Rye grain is used for bread, beer, rye whiskey, and animal fodder. In Scandinavia, rye was a staple food in the Middle Ages, and rye crispbread remains a popular food in the region. Europe produces around half of the world's rye; relatively little is traded between countries. A wheat-rye hybrid, triticale, combines the qualities of the two parent crops and is produced in large quantities worldwide. In European folklore, the Roggenwolf ("rye wolf") is a carnivorous corn demon or Feldgeist.

== Description ==
Rye is a tall grass grown for its seeds; it can be an annual or a biennial. Depending on environmental conditions and variety it reaches 1 to 3 metres (3 1/2 to 10 ft) in height. Its leaves are blue-green, long, and pointed. The seeds are carried in a curved head or spike some 7 to 15 centimetres (2 3/4 to 6 in) long. The head is composed of many spikelets, each of which holds two small flowers; the spikelets alternate left and right up the head.

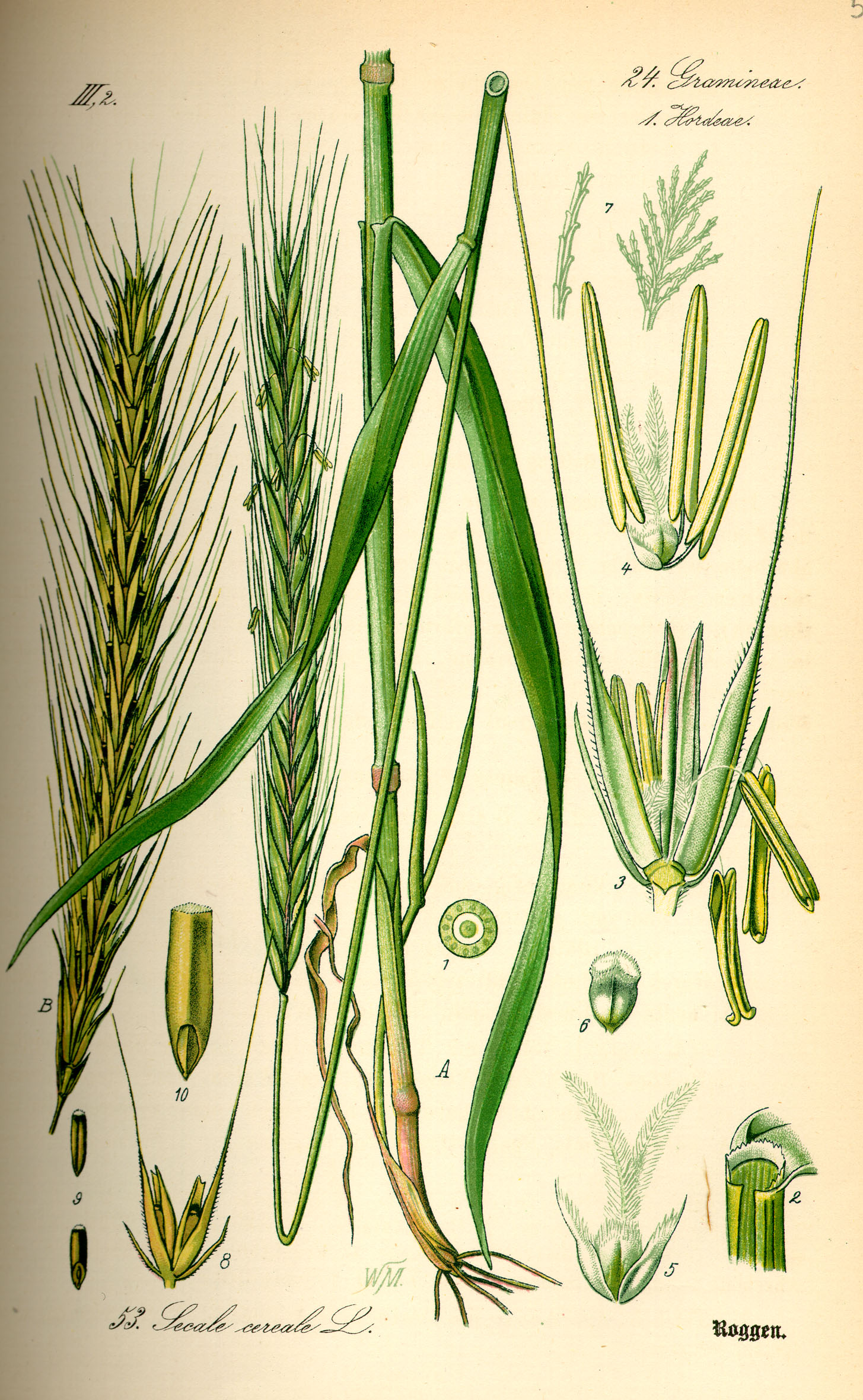
Botanical illustration

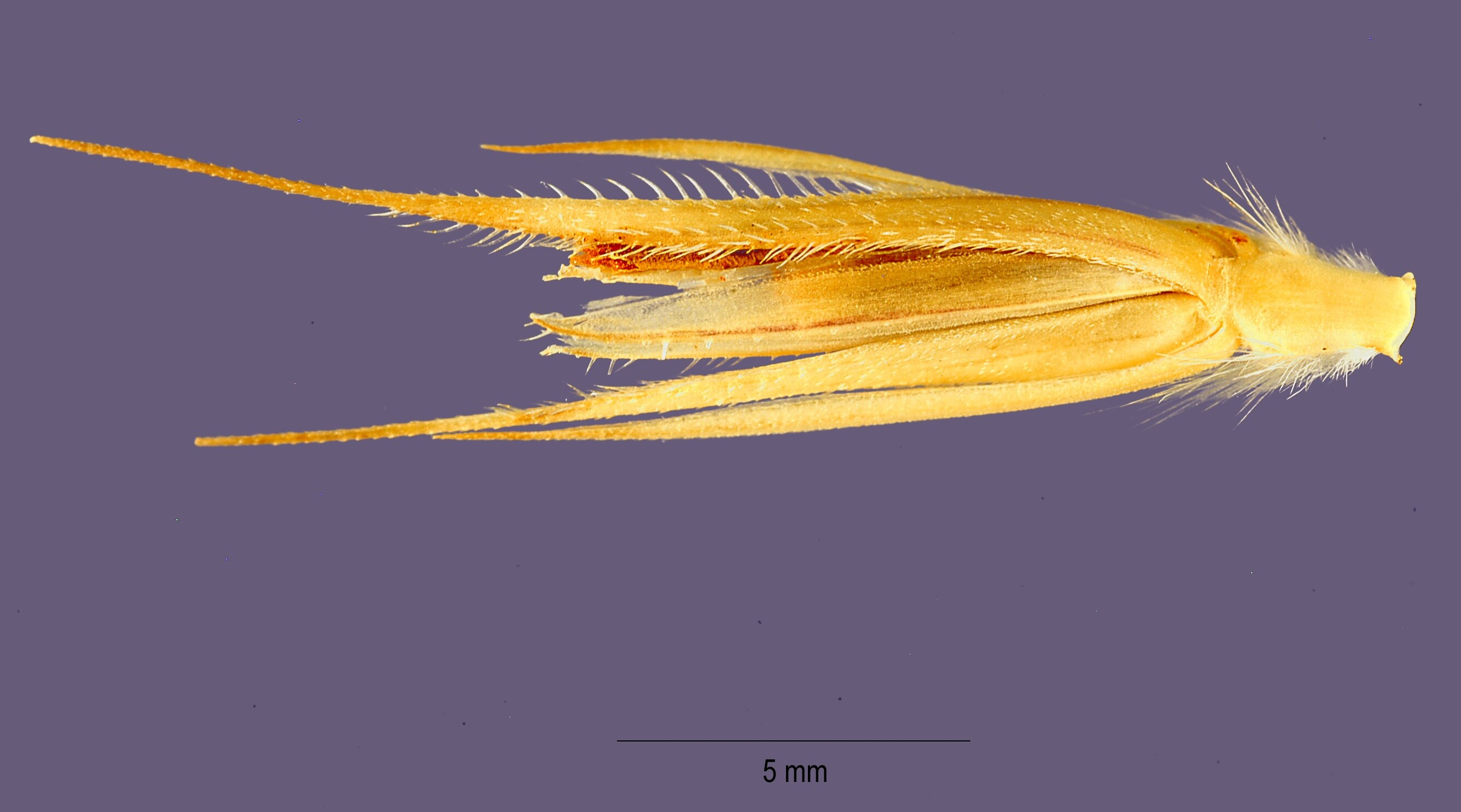
Seed in husk

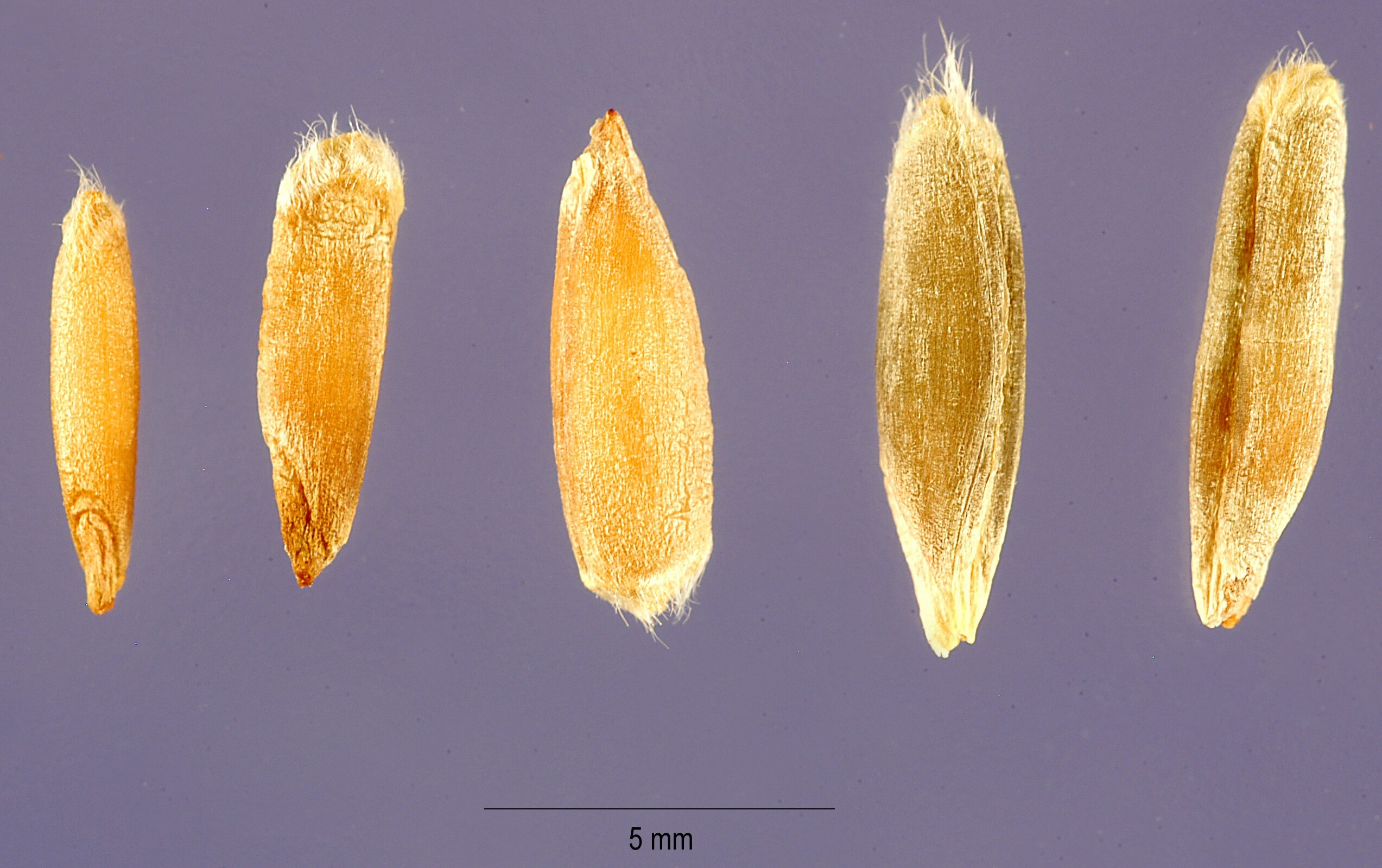
Different types of grains

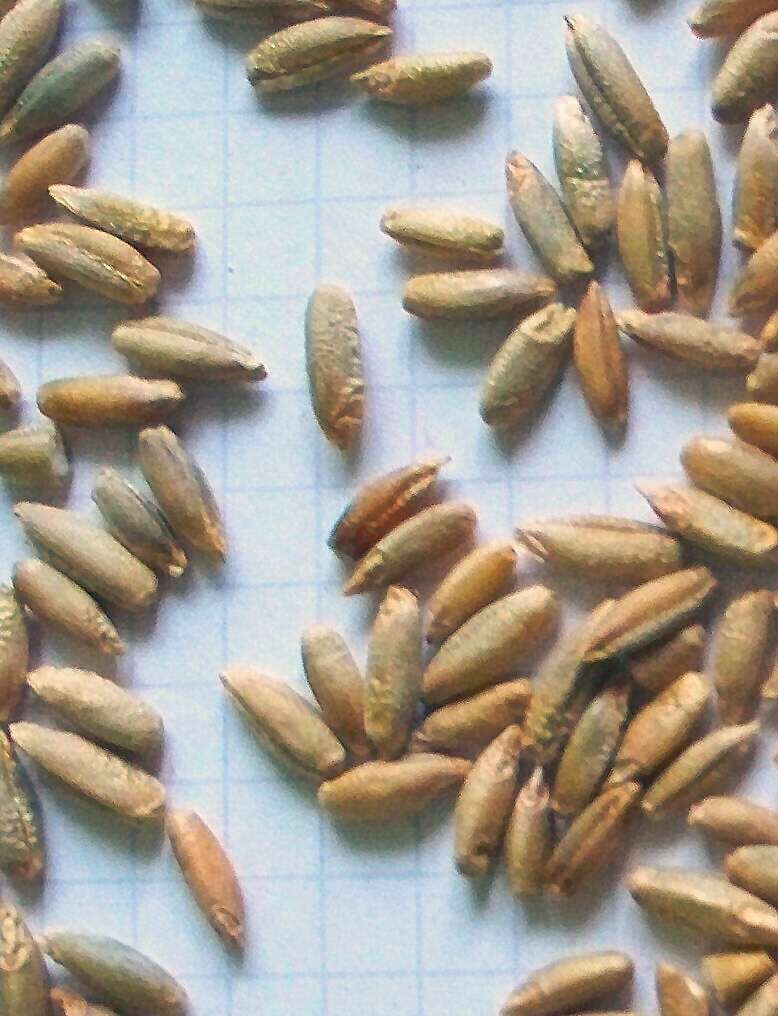
Seeds in quantity

== Origins ==
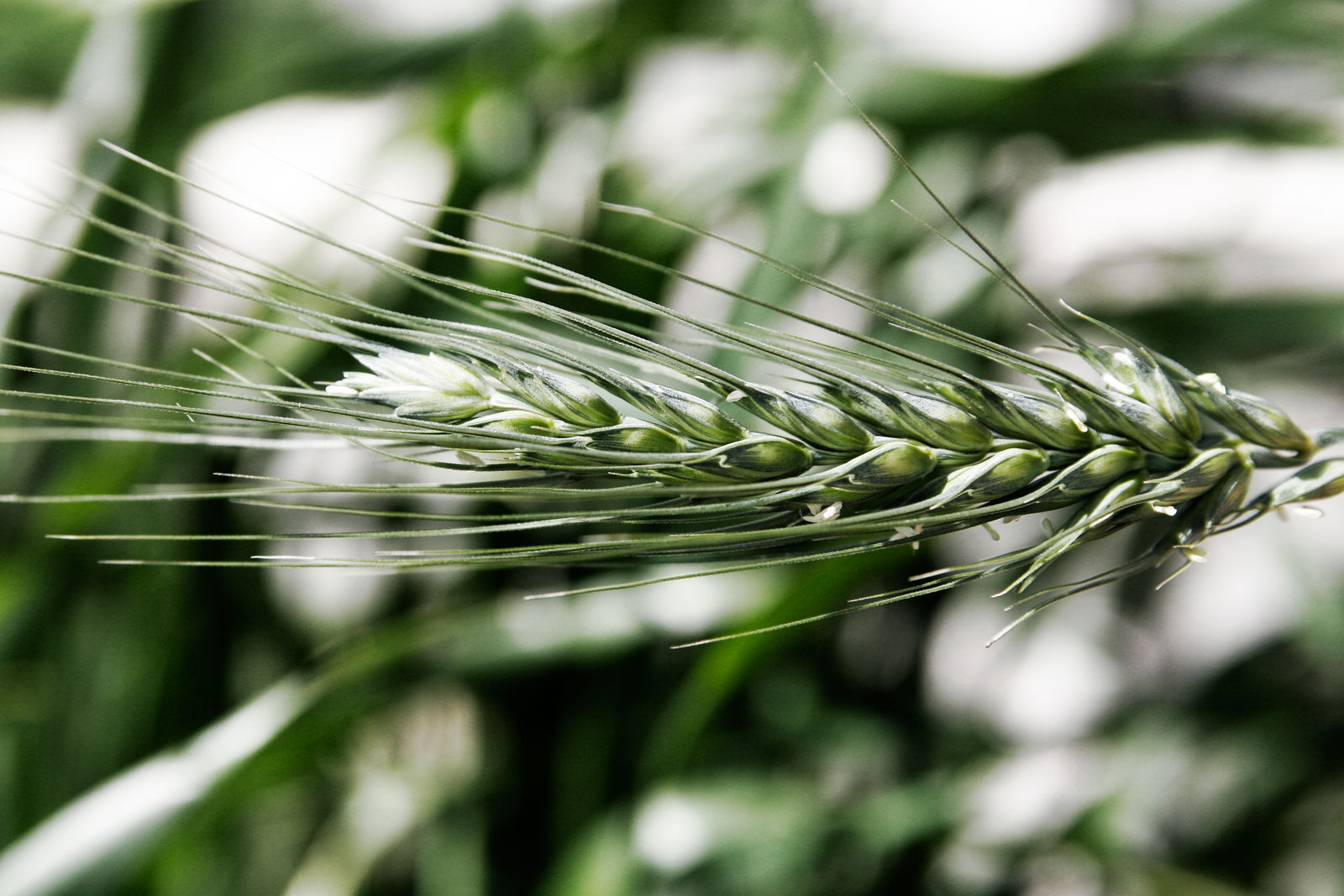
Wild rye

The rye genus Secale is in the grass tribe Triticeae, which contains other cereals such as barley (Hordeum) and wheat (Triticum) species.

The generic name Secale, related to Italian segale and French seigle meaning "rye", is of unknown origin but may derive from a Balkan language. The English name rye derives from Old English ryge, related to Dutch rogge, German Roggen, and Russian рожь rožʹ, again all with the same meaning.

Rye is one of several cereals that grow wild in the Levant, central and eastern Turkey and adjacent areas. Evidence uncovered at the Epipalaeolithic site of Tell Abu Hureyra in the Euphrates valley of northern Syria suggests that rye was among the first cereal crops to be systematically cultivated, around 13,000 years ago. However, that claim remains controversial; critics point to inconsistencies in the radiocarbon dates, and identifications based solely on grain, rather than on chaff. The current best candidate for the ancestral species for domesticated rye is Secale segetale.

Domesticated rye occurs in small quantities at a number of Neolithic sites in Asia Minor (Anatolia, now Turkey), such as the Pre-Pottery Neolithic B Can Hasan III near Çatalhöyük, but is otherwise absent from the archaeological record until the Bronze Age of central Europe, c. 1800–1500 BCE.

It is likely that rye was brought westwards from Asia Minor as a secondary crop, meaning that it was a minor admixture in wheat as a result of Vavilovian mimicry, and was only later cultivated in its own right. Archeological evidence of this grain has been found in Roman contexts along the Rhine and the Danube and in Ireland and Britain. The Roman naturalist Pliny the Elder was dismissive of a grain that may have been rye, writing that it "is a very poor food and only serves to avert starvation". He said it was mixed with emmer "to mitigate its bitter taste, and even then is most unpleasant to the stomach".

== Cultivation ==
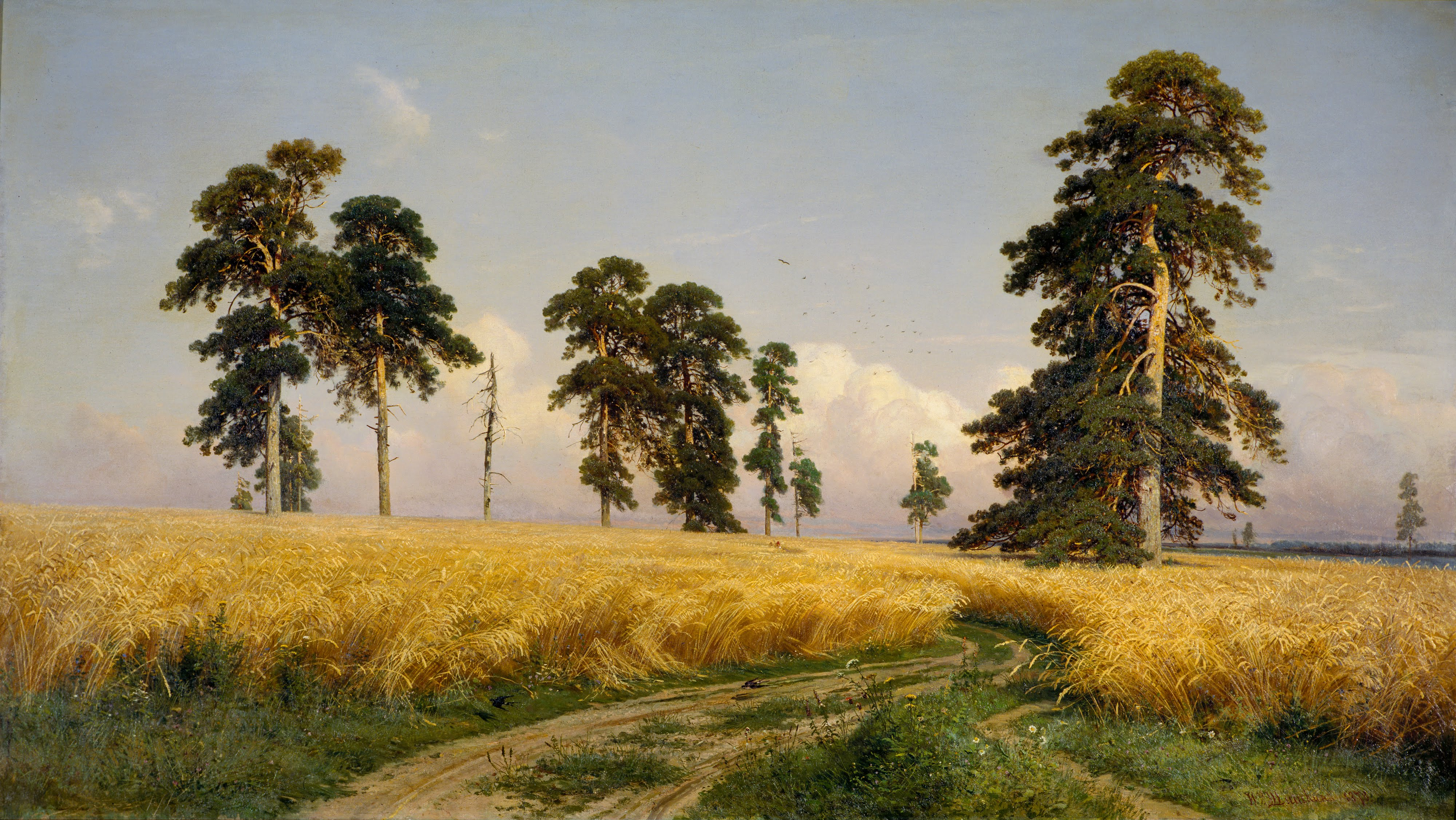
1878 oil painting A Rye Field by Ivan Shishkin

Since the Middle Ages, people have cultivated rye widely in Central and Eastern Europe. It serves as the main bread cereal in most areas east of the France–Germany border and north of Hungary. In Southern Europe, it was cultivated on marginal lands.

Rye grows well in much poorer soils than those necessary for most cereal grains. Thus, it is an especially valuable crop in regions where the soil has sand or peat. Rye plants withstand cold better than other small grains, surviving snow cover that would kill winter wheat. Winter rye is the most popular: it is planted and begins to grow in autumn. In spring, the plants develop rapidly. This allows it to provide spring grazing, at a time when spring-planted wheat has only just germinated.

The physical properties of rye affect attributes of the final food product such as seed size, surface area, and porosity. The surface area of the seed directly correlates to the drying and heat transfer time. Smaller seeds have increased heat transfer, which leads to lower drying time. Seeds with lower porosity lose water more slowly during the process of drying.

Rye is harvested like wheat with a combine harvester, which cuts the plants, threshes and winnows the grain, and releases the straw to the field where it is later pressed into bales or left as soil amendment. The resultant grain is stored in local silos or transported to regional grain elevators and combined with other lots for storage and distant shipment. Before the era of mechanised agriculture, rye harvesting was a manual task performed with scythes or sickles.

=== Agroecology ===
Winter rye is any breed of rye planted in the autumn to provide ground cover for the winter. It grows during warmer days of the winter when sunlight temporarily warms the plant above freezing, even while there is general snow cover. It can be used as a cover crop to prevent the growth of winter-hardy weeds.

Rye grows better than any other cereal in heavy clay and light sandy soil, and infertile or drought-affected soils. It can tolerate pH between 4.5 and 8.0, but soils having pH 5.0 to 7.0 are best suited for rye cultivation. Rye grows best in fertile, well-drained loam or clay-loam soils. As for temperature, the crop can thrive in subzero environments, assisted by the production of antifreeze polypeptides (different from those produced by some fish and insects) by the leaves of winter rye.

Rye is a common, unwanted invader of winter wheat fields. If allowed to grow and mature, it may cause substantially reduced prices (docking) for harvested wheat.

=== Pests and diseases ===
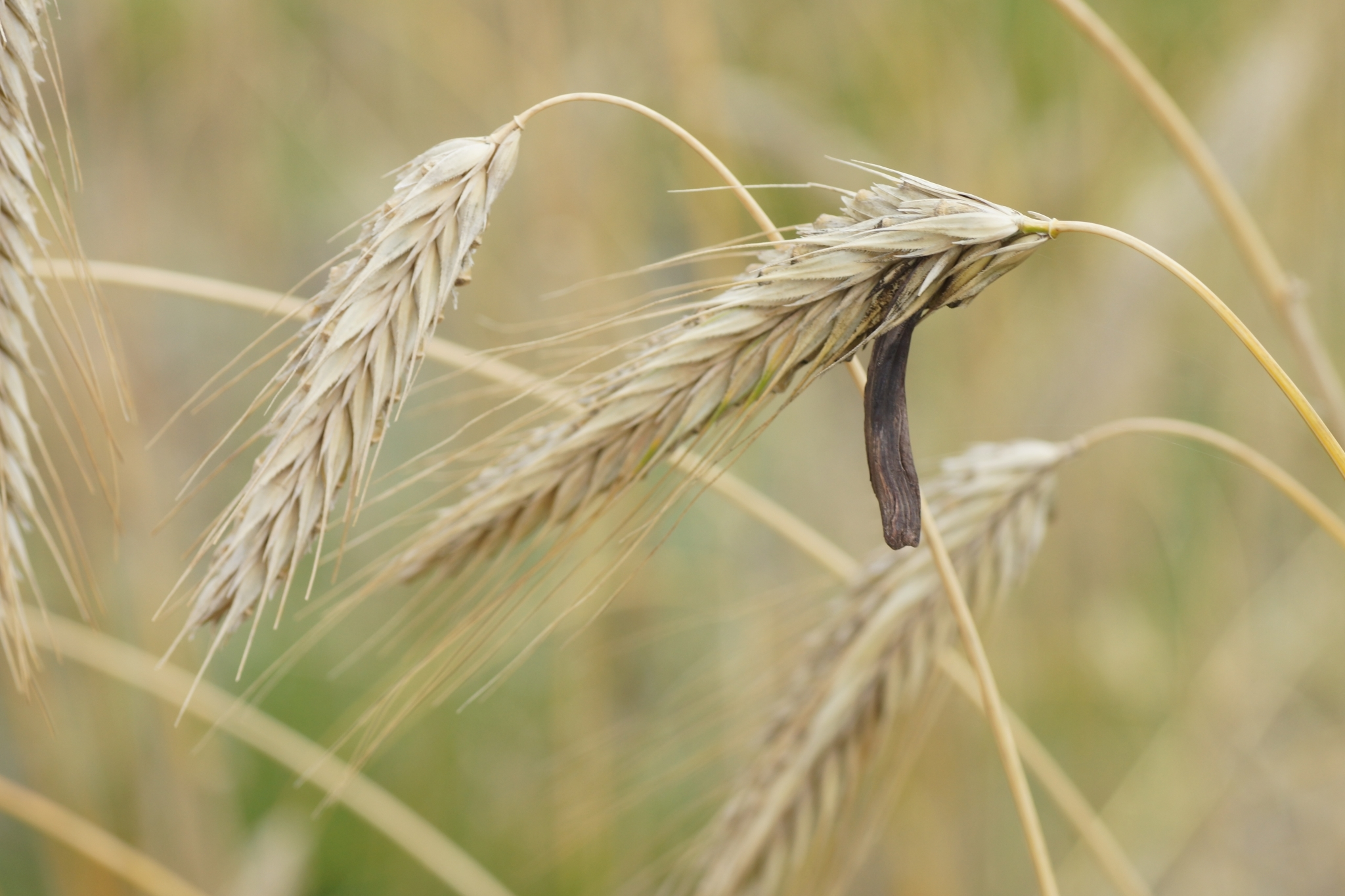
The poisonous ergot fungus growing on rye

Pests including the nematode Ditylenchus dipsaci and a variety of herbivorous insects can seriously affect plant health.

Rye is highly susceptible to the ergot fungus. Consumption of ergot-infected rye by humans and animals results in ergotism, which causes convulsions, miscarriage, necrosis of digits, hallucinations and death. Historically, damp northern countries that depended on rye as a staple crop were subject to periodic epidemics. Modern grain-cleaning and milling methods have practically eliminated ergotism, but it remains a risk if food safety vigilance breaks down.

After an absence of 60 years, stem rust (Puccinia graminis f. sp. tritici) has returned to Europe in the 2020s. Areas affected include Germany, Russia (Western Siberia), Spain, and Sweden.

=== Production ===
Rye production 2023, tonnes
Germany	3,124,200
Poland	2,533,220
Russia	1,700,000
Belarus	780,000
Denmark	601,130
China	518,640
World	12,680,515
FAOSTAT of the United Nations

In 2023, world production of rye was 12.7 million tonnes, led by Germany with 25% of the total, and Poland and Russia as major secondary producers.

Rye yield

Per capita production of rye

== Nutrition ==
=== Health effects ===
Rye
Nutritional value per 100 g (3.5 oz)
- Energy: 1,414 kJ (338 kcal)
- Carbohydrates: 75.86 g
- Sugars: 0.98 g
- Dietary fiber: 15.1 g
- Fat: 1.63 g
- Protein: 10.34 g
Vitamins and minerals
Vitamins	Quantity %DV^{†}
Thiamine (B1)	25% 0.3 mg
Riboflavin (B2)	23% 0.3 mg
Niacin (B3)	25% 4 mg
Pantothenic acid (B5)	20% 1 mg
Vitamin B6	18% 0.3 mg
Folate (B9)	10% 38 μg
Choline	5% 30 mg
Vitamin E	7% 1 mg
Vitamin K	5% 6 μg
Minerals	Quantity %DV^{†}
Calcium	2% 24 mg
Iron	17% 3 mg
Magnesium	26% 110 mg
Manganese	130% 3 mg
Phosphorus	27% 332 mg
Potassium	17% 510 mg
Sodium	0% 2 mg
Zinc	27% 3 mg
- Other constituents: Quantity
- Water: 10.6 g
- Selenium: 14 µg
- Link to USDA Database Entry
- ^{†}Percentages estimated using US recommendations for adults, except for potassium, which is estimated based on expert recommendation from the National Academies.

Raw rye is 11% water, 76% carbohydrates, 10% protein, and 2% fat. A reference amount of 100-gram (3 1/2-ounce) provides 1,410 kilojoules (338 kilocalories) of food energy, and is a rich source (20% or more of the Daily Value, DV) of dietary fiber, B vitamins, such as thiamine and niacin (each at 25% DV), and several dietary minerals, including manganese (130% DV), zinc, phosphorus, and magnesium (26–27% DV).

According to Health Canada and the U.S. Food and Drug Administration, consuming at least 4 grams (0.14 oz) per day of rye beta-glucan or 0.65 grams (0.023 oz) per serving of soluble fiber can lower levels of blood cholesterol, a risk factor for cardiovascular diseases.

Eating whole-grain rye, as well as other high-fiber grains, improves regulation of blood sugar (i.e., reduces blood glucose response to a meal). Consuming breakfast cereals containing rye over weeks to months also improved cholesterol levels and glucose regulation.

=== Health concerns ===
Like wheat, barley, and their hybrids and derivatives, rye contains glutens and related prolamines, which makes it an unsuitable grain for consumption by people with gluten-related disorders, such as celiac disease, non-celiac gluten sensitivity, and wheat allergy, among others. Nevertheless, some wheat allergy patients can tolerate rye or barley.

== Uses ==
=== Food ===
Yearly per capita supply of rye

Rye grain is refined into a flour high in gliadin but low in glutenin and rich in soluble fiber. Alkylresorcinols are phenolic lipids present in high amounts in the bran layer (e.g. pericarp, testa and aleurone layers) of wheat and rye (0.1–0.3% of dry weight). Rye bread, including pumpernickel, is made using rye flour and is a widely eaten food in Northern and Eastern Europe. In Scandinavia, rye is widely used to make crispbread (Knäckebröd); in the Middle Ages it was a staple food in the region, and it remains popular in the 21st century.

Rye grain is used to make alcoholic drinks, such as rye whiskey and rye beer. The traditional cloudy and sweet-sour low-alcohol beverage kvass is fermented from rye bread or rye flour and malt.

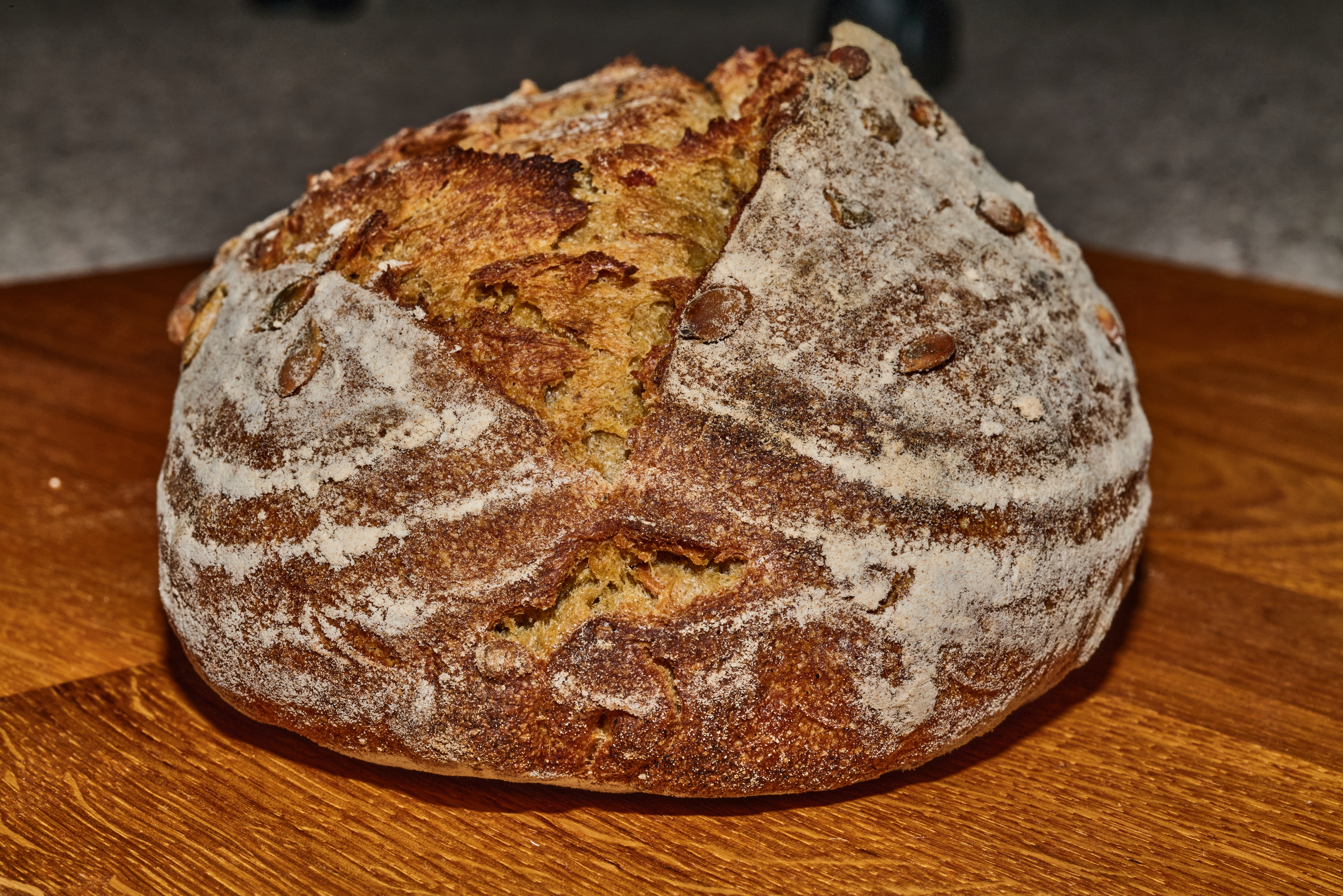
Rye bread

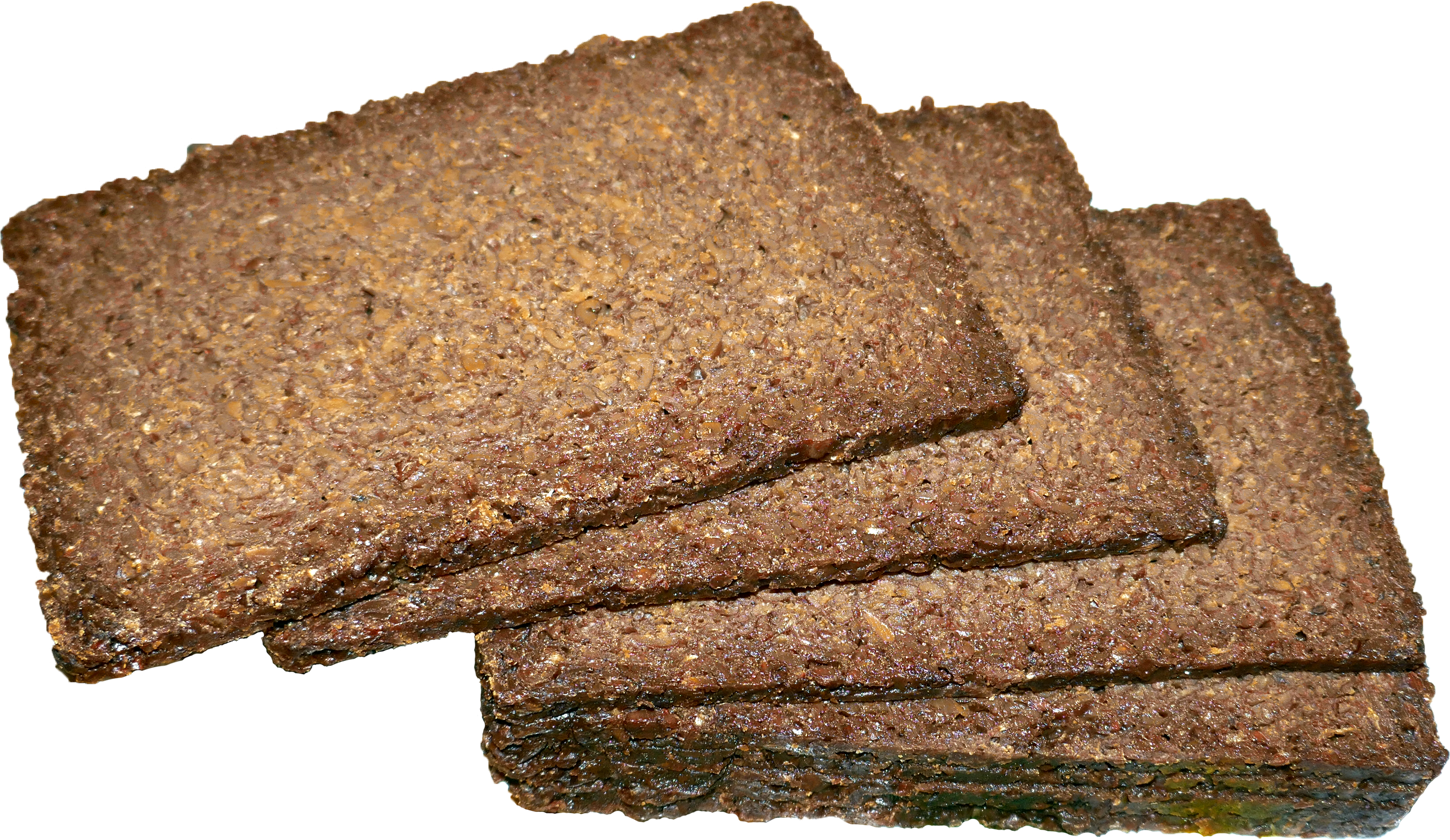
Pumpernickel

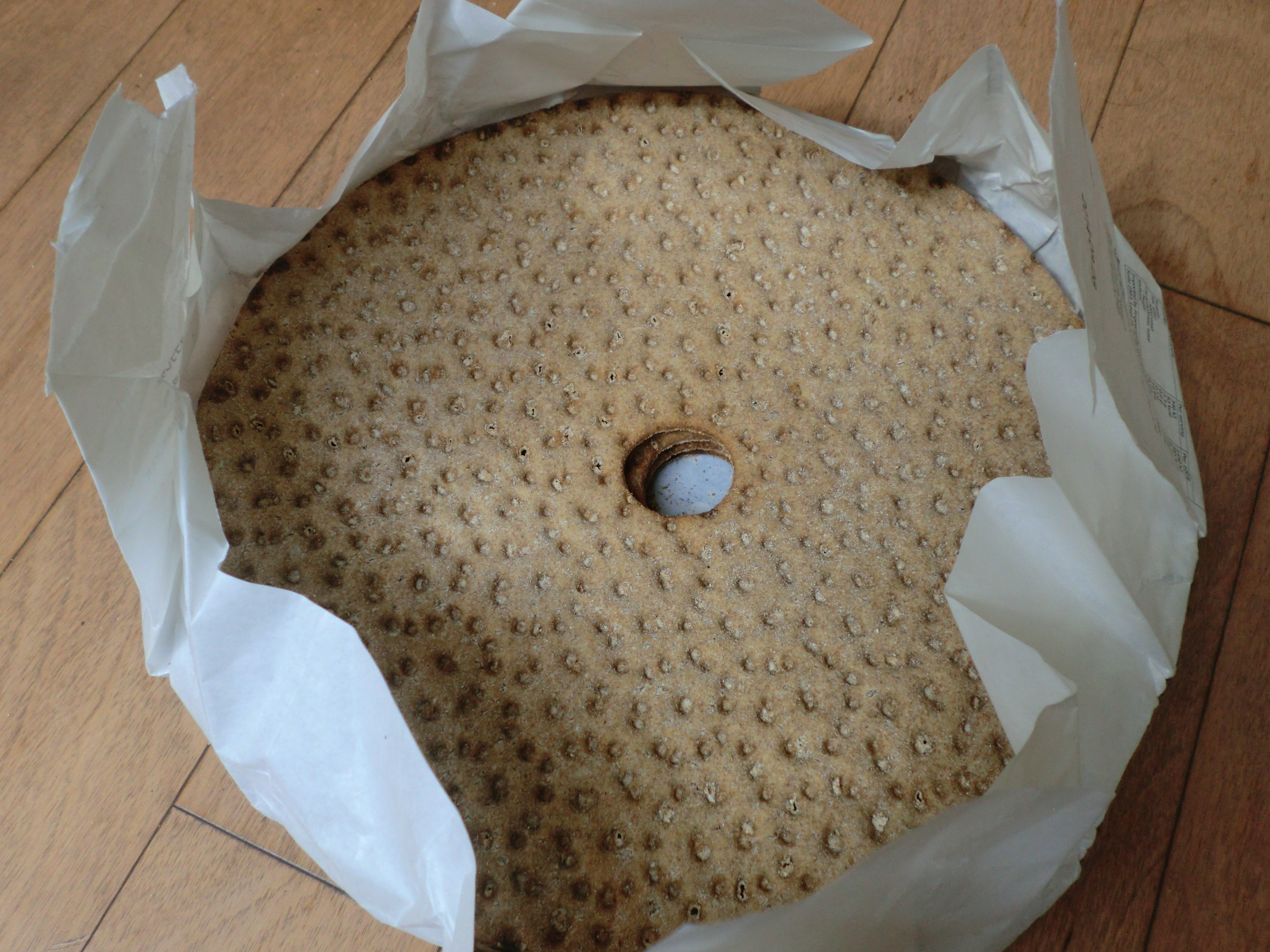
Swedish rye crispbread (Knäckebröd)

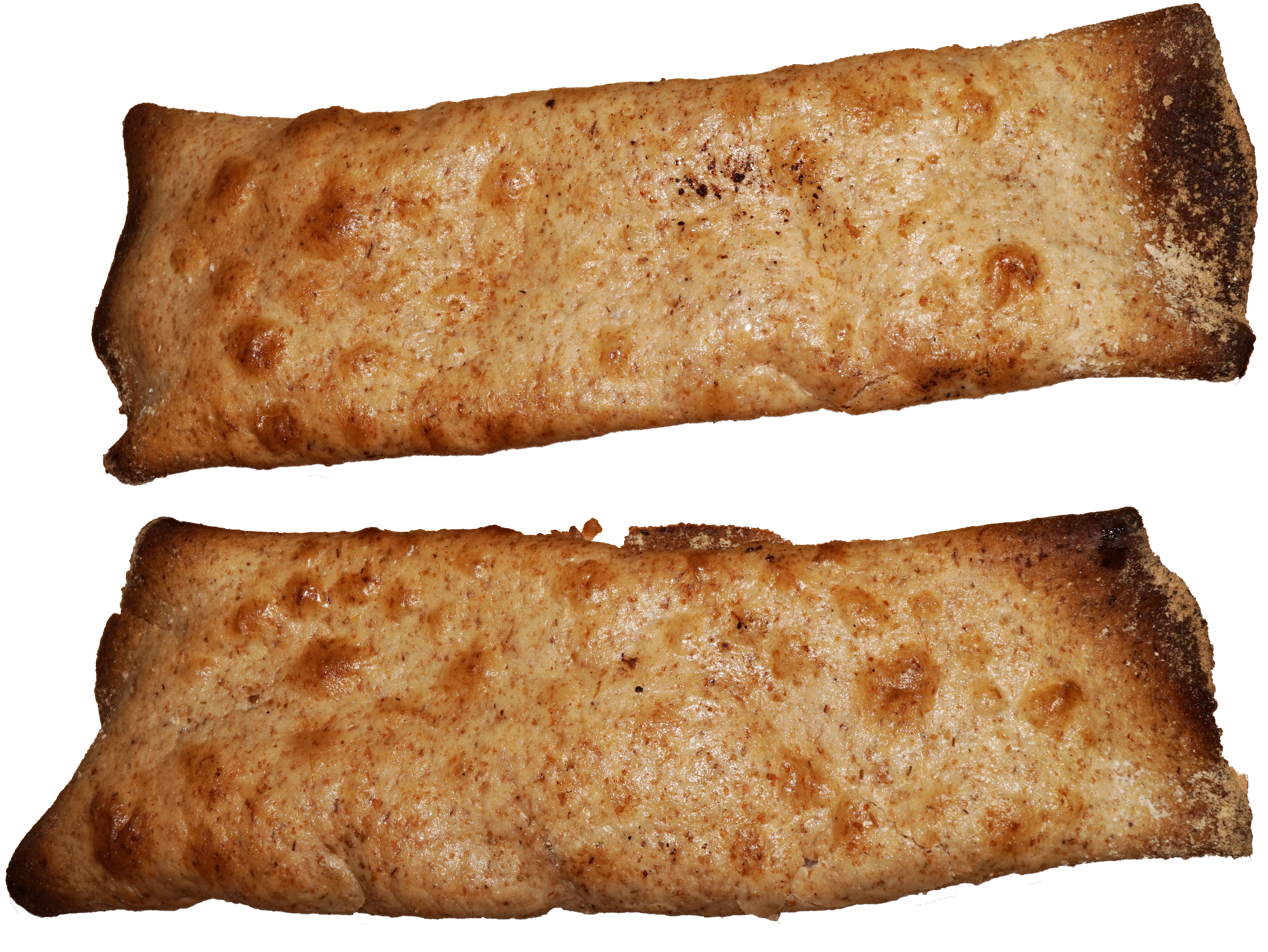
Sultsina, a traditional Karelian dish made of unleavened rye dough and a farina filling

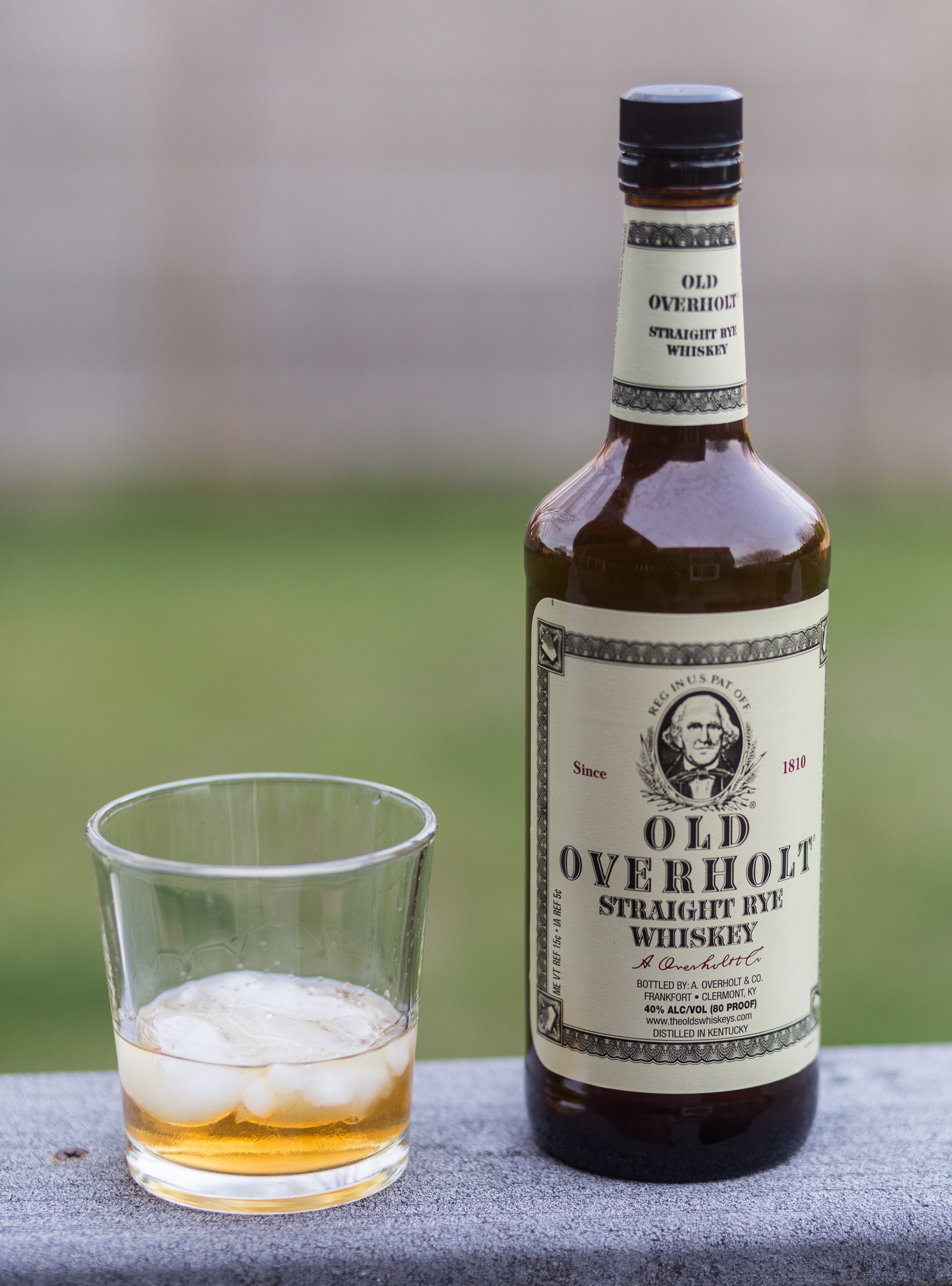
Rye whiskey

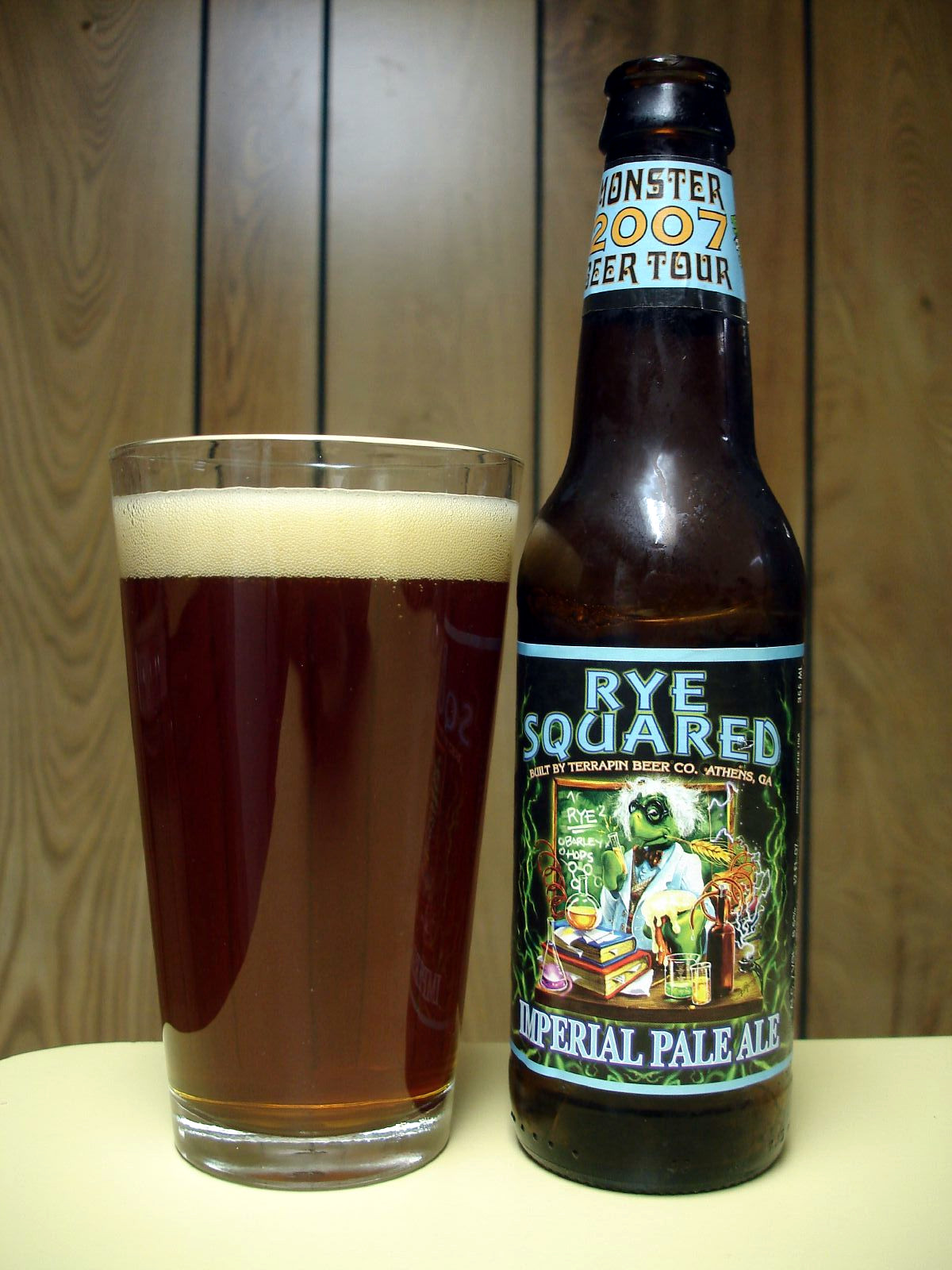
Rye beer

=== Production of hybrids ===
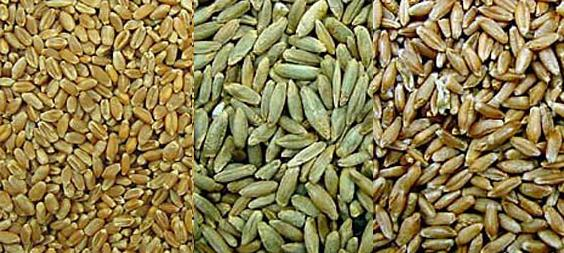
Grains of wheat, rye, and their hybrid, triticale. Triticale is significantly larger than wheat.

Plant breeders, starting in the 19th century in Germany and Scotland, but mainly from the 1950s, worked to develop a hybrid cereal with the best qualities of wheat and rye, now called triticale. Modern triticales are hexaploid with six sets of chromosomes; they are used to produce millions of tons of cereal annually.

Varieties of rye hold much genetic diversity, which can be used to improve other crops such as wheat. For example, the pollination abilities of wheat can be improved by the addition of the rye chromosome 4R; this increases the size of the wheat anther and the amount of pollen. The 1R chromosome is the source of many crop disease resistance genes. Varieties such as Petkus, Insave, Amigo, and Imperial have donated 1R-originating resistance to wheat. AC Hazlet rye is a medium-sized winter rye with resistance to both lodging and shattering. Rye was the gene donor of Sr31 – a stem rust resistance gene – introgressed into wheat.

The characteristics of S. cereale have been combined with another perennial rye, S. montanum, to produce S. cereanum, which has the beneficial characteristics of each. The hybrid rye can be grown in harsh environments and on poor soil. It provides improved forage with digestible fiber and protein.

=== Other uses ===
Rye is a useful forage crop in cool climates; it grows vigorously and provides plentiful fodder for grazing animals, or green manure to improve the soil. It forms a good cover crop in winter with its rapid growth and deep roots.

Rye straw is used as livestock bedding, despite the risk of ergot poisoning. It is used on a small scale to make crafts such as corn dollies. More recently it has found uses as a raw material for bioconversion to products such as the sweetener xylitol.

Rye flour is boiled with red iron oxide pigments and some additives to make traditional Falun red paint, widely used as a house paint in Sweden and other Scandinavian countries.

== In human culture ==
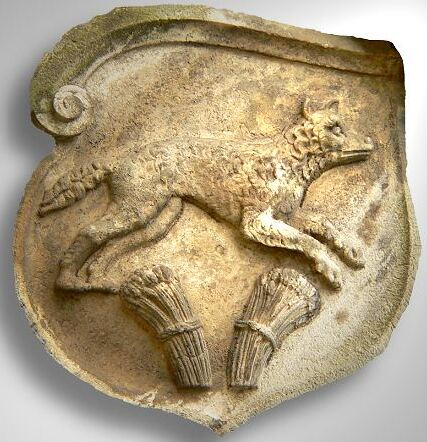
A Roggenwolf, a carnivorous spirit of the rye fields, with sheaves of harvested rye, on the coat of arms of the Bartensleben family

In European folklore, the Roggenwolf ("rye wolf") is a carnivorous corn demon or Feldgeist, a field spirit shaped like a wolf. The Roggenwolf steals children and feeds on them. The last grain heads are often left at their place as a sacrifice for the agricultural spirits.

In contrast, the Roggenmuhme or Roggenmutter ("rye aunt" or "rye mother") is an anthropomorphic female corn demon with fiery fingers. Her breasts are filled with tar and may end in tips of iron. Her breasts are also long, and as such must be thrown over her shoulders when she runs. The Roggenmuhme is completely black or white, and in her hand she has a birch or whip from which lightning sparks. She can change herself into different animals, such as snakes, turtles, and frogs.

The classical scholar Carl A. P. Ruck writes that the Roggenmutter was believed to go through the fields, rustling like the wind, with a pack of rye wolves running after her. They spread ergot through the sheaves of harvested rye. According to Ruck, they then lured children into the fields to nurse on the infected grains "like the iron teats of the Roggenmutter". The enlarged reddish ergot-infected grains were known as Wulfzähne (wolf teeth).
