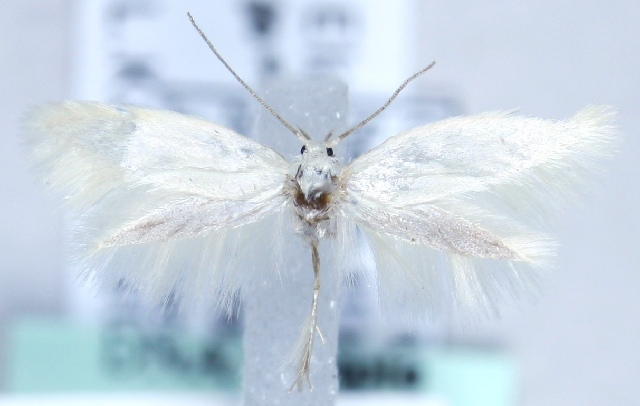

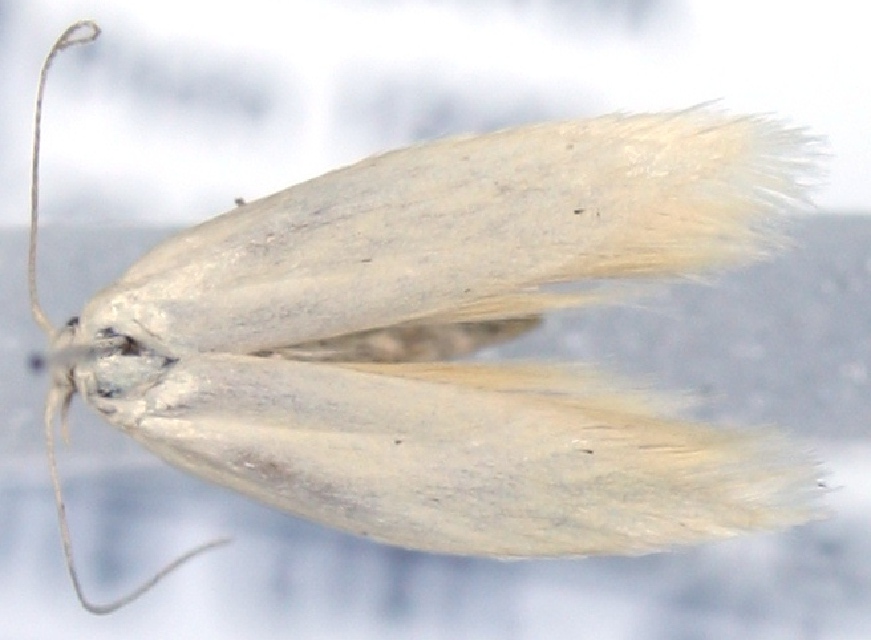

Scientific classification
- Kingdom: Animalia
- Phylum: Arthropoda
- Class: Insecta
- Order: Lepidoptera
- Family: Elachistidae
- Genus: Elachista
- Species: E. grotenfelti

Binomial name
- Elachista grotenfelti Kaila, 2012

= Elachista grotenfelti =

Species of moth

Elachista grotenfelti is a moth species of the family Elachistidae. It is found in Bulgaria, Greece and Turkey.

The wingspan is 13–18.5 mm (0.51–0.73 in).
