= Lodging (agriculture) =

Agricultural term, bending over of the stems near ground level of crops

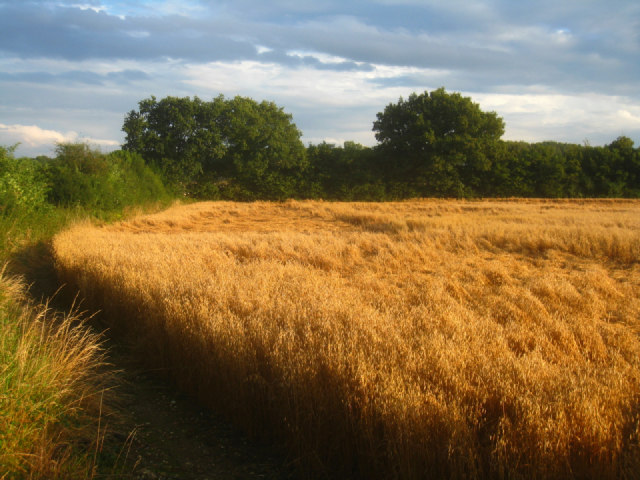
A field of ripe wheat, badly lodged (flattened) by wind and heavy showers

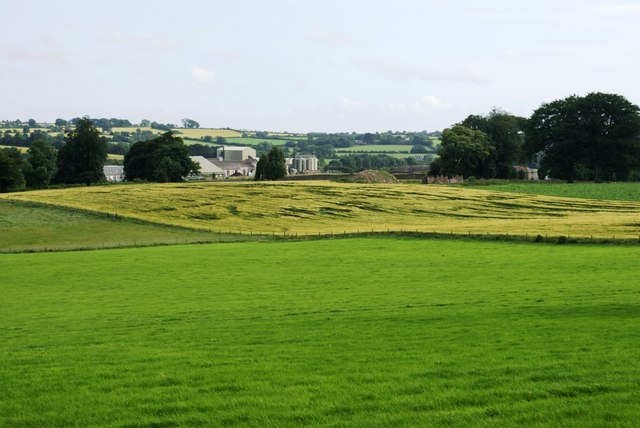
A badly lodged field of barley from a distance

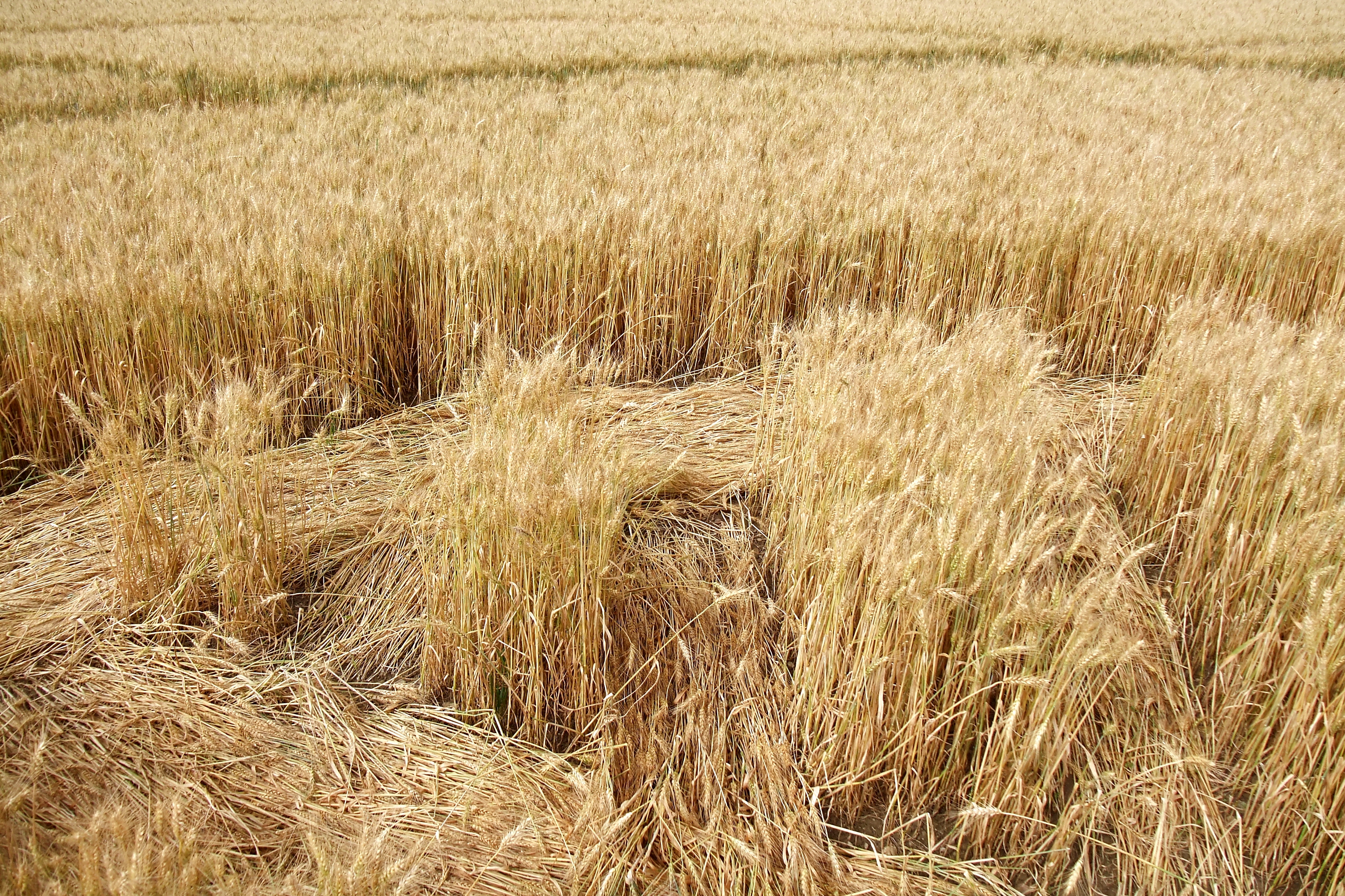
Lodging caused by humans flattening grain to make a crop circle

Lodging is the bending over of the stems near ground level of grain crops, which makes them very difficult to harvest, and can dramatically reduce yield. Lodging in cereals is often a result of the combined effects of inadequate standing power of the crop, and conditions such as rain, wind, hail, topography, soil, previous crop, and others.

Lodging affects wheat, rice, and other cereals, and reducing it is a major goal of agricultural research. Dwarf varieties, which are shorter, are one way of reducing lodging.

Lodging may occur at the root or the stem; the latter typically happens later, when the stem is dry and brittle. The timing of lodging can control its effect on yield, disease, grain moisture, quality, and evenness of ripening.
