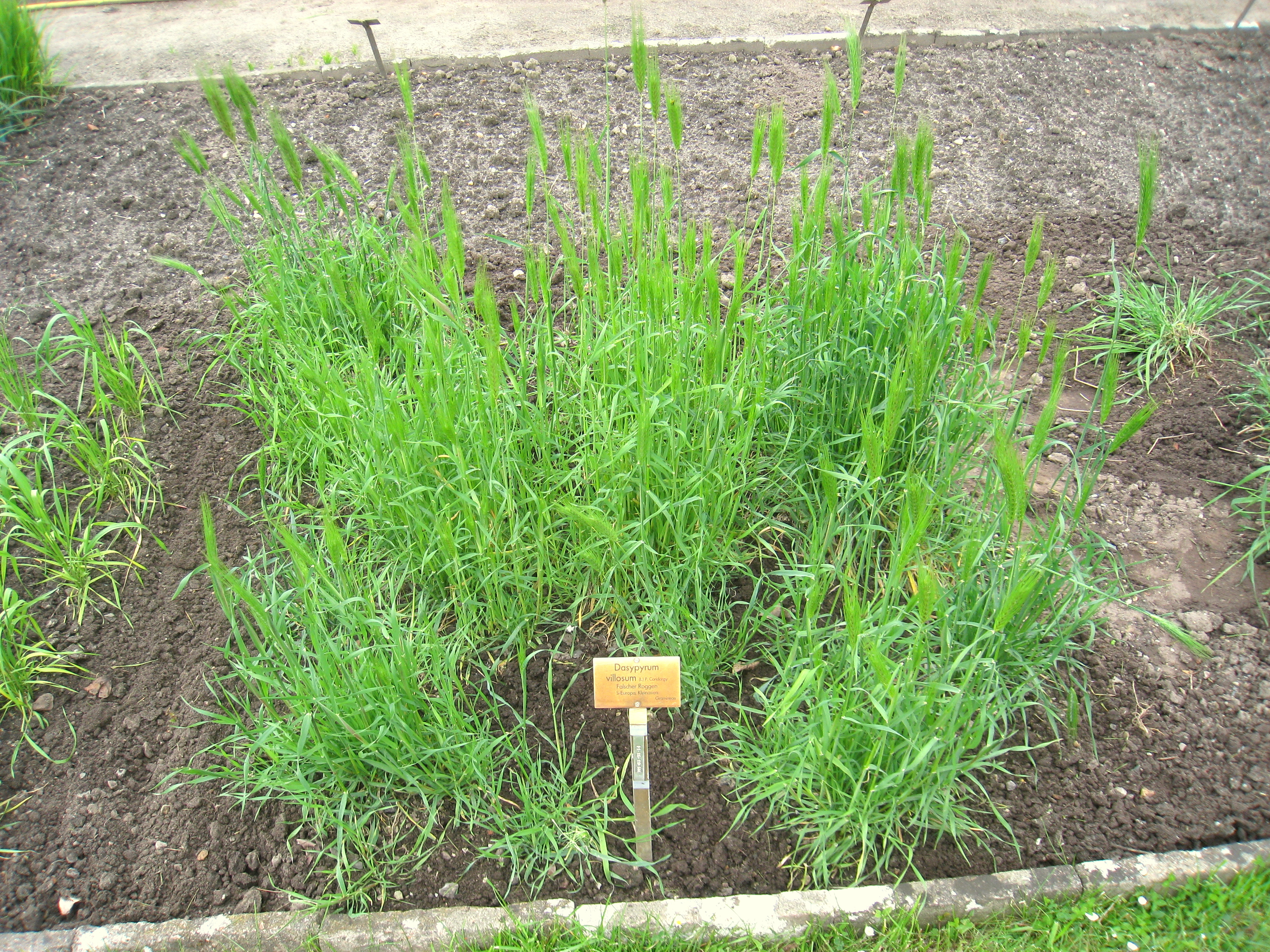

Scientific classification
- Kingdom: Plantae
- Clade: Tracheophytes
- Clade: Angiosperms
- Clade: Monocots
- Clade: Commelinids
- Order: Poales
- Family: Poaceae
- Subfamily: Pooideae
- Genus: Dasypyrum
- Species: D. villosum

Binomial name
- Dasypyrum villosum (L.) Borbás

Synonyms
- Secale villosum L.; Triticum villosum (L.) M.Bieb. 1819 not Host 1809 nor (L.) F. Herm. 1936; Agropyron villosum (L.) Link; Haynaldia villosa (L.) Schur; Pseudosecale villosum (L.) Degen; Hordeum ciliatum Lam.; Triticum caudatum Pers.; Agropyron caudatum (Pers.) P.Beauv.

= Dasypyrum villosum =

Species of grass

Dasypyrum villosum is a species of annual grass in the family Poaceae. It is native to eastern and southern Europe and Western Asia from the Balearic Islands to Turkmenistan, including in the Mediterranean and the Caucasus regions.

== Description ==
Culms are decumbent, with heights ranging from 25 to 70 cm. Racemes are single, oblong, bilateral, and 4–10 cm long; spikelets are oblong, laterally compressed, and 7–20 mm long.

== Stem rust resistance ==
D. villosum has almost total immunity against Puccinia graminis f. sp. tritici and carries Sr52 which offers some resistance against the Ug99 subrace of P.g.f.sp.t.. The genetic basis for this immunity is being introgressed into its close relative, wheat, which is suffering from new races of this disease.
