= Taxonomy of wheat =

Classification of wheat

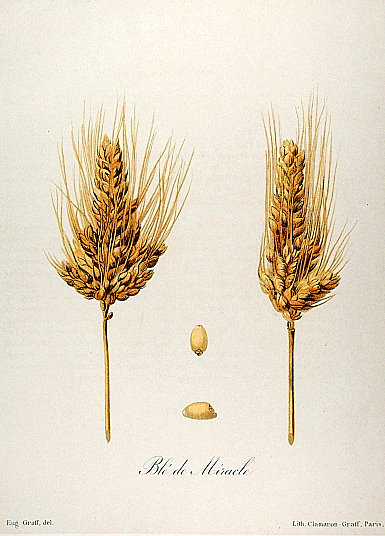
Miracle wheat (Triticum turgidum var. mirabile)

During 10,000 years of cultivation, numerous forms of wheat, many of them hybrids, have developed under a combination of artificial and natural selection. This diversity has led to much confusion in the naming of wheats. Genetic and morphological characteristics of wheat influence its classification; many common and botanical names of wheat are in current use.

== Aegilops and Triticum ==
=== Similarities and differences ===
The genus Triticum includes the wild and domesticated species usually thought of as wheat.

In the 1950s growing awareness of the genetic similarity of the wild goatgrasses (Aegilops) led botanists such as Bowden to amalgamate Aegilops and Triticum as one genus, Triticum. This approach is still followed by some (mainly geneticists), but has not been widely adopted by taxonomists. Aegilops is morphologically highly distinct from Triticum, with rounded rather than keeled glumes.

=== Hybridisation and polyploidy ===
Wheat origins by repeated hybridization and polyploidy (e.g. "6N" means 6 sets of chromosomes per cell rather than the usual 2). Only a few of the wheat species involved are shown. The goatgrass species involved are not known for certain.

Aegilops is important in wheat evolution because of its role in two important hybridisation events. Wild emmer (T. dicoccoides and T. araraticum) resulted from the hybridisation of a wild wheat, T. urartu, and an as yet unidentified goatgrass, probably closely related to Ae. speltoides. Hexaploid wheats (e.g. T. aestivum – the most common – and T. spelta) are the result of a hybridisation between a domesticated tetraploid wheat, probably T. dicoccum or T. durum, and another goatgrass, Ae. tauschii or Ae. squarrosa. The hexaploid genome is an allohexaploid composed of two copies each of three subgenomes, AABBDD. The A genome is from T. urartu (AA). The B genome is a descendant of the S genome of an unidentified species related to Aegilops section Sitopsis (SS). This natural hybridization event happened ~3–0.8 MYA, yielding the tetraploid T. dicoccoides. In time this tetraploid gave rise to T. turgidum, which gave rise to modern durum. Then ~0.4 MYA T. diccocoides naturally crossed with Aegilops tauschii (DD), adding the D genome and yielding the hexaploid.

== Early taxonomy ==
Botanists of the classical period, such as Columella, and in sixteenth and seventeenth century herbals, divided wheats into two groups, Triticum corresponding to free-threshing wheats, and Zea corresponding to hulled ('spelt') wheats.

Carl Linnaeus recognised five species, all domesticated:

- T. aestivum Bearded spring wheat
- T. hybernum Beardless winter wheat
- T. turgidum Rivet wheat
- T. spelta Spelt wheat
- T. monococcum Einkorn wheat

Later classifications added to the number of species described, but continued to give species status to relatively minor variants, such as winter- vs. spring- forms. The wild wheats were not described until the mid-19th century because of the poor state of botanical exploration in the Near East, where they grow.

The development of a modern classification depended on the discovery, in the 1920s, that wheat was divided into 3 ploidy levels.

== Important characters in wheat ==
=== Ploidy level ===
As with many grasses, polyploidy is common in wheat. There are two wild diploid (non-polyploid) wheats, T. boeoticum and T. urartu. T. boeoticum is the wild ancestor of domesticated einkorn, T. monococcum. Cells of the diploid wheats each contain 2 complements of 7 chromosomes, one from the mother and one from the father (2n=2x=14, where 2n is the number of chromosomes in each somatic cell, and x is the basic chromosome number).

The polyploid wheats are tetraploid (4 sets of chromosomes, 2n=4x=28), or hexaploid (6 sets of chromosomes, 2n=6x=42). The tetraploid wild wheats are wild emmer, T. dicoccoides, and T. araraticum. Wild emmer is the ancestor of all the domesticated tetraploid wheats, with one exception: T. araraticum is the wild ancestor of T. timopheevii.

There are no wild hexaploid wheats, although feral forms of common wheat are sometimes found. Hexaploid wheats developed under domestication. Genetic analysis has shown that the original hexaploid wheats were the result of a cross between a tetraploid domesticated wheat, such as T. dicoccum or T. durum, and a wild goatgrass, such as Ae. tauschii.

Polyploidy is important to wheat classification for three reasons:

- Wheats within one ploidy level will be more closely related to each other.
- Ploidy level influences some plant characteristics. For example, higher levels of ploidy tend to be linked to larger cell size.
- Polyploidy brings new genomes into a species. For example, Aegilops tauschii brought the D genome into hexaploid wheats, with enhanced cold-hardiness and some distinctive morphological features.

=== Genome ===
Observation of chromosome behaviour during meiosis, and the results of hybridisation experiments, have shown that wheat genomes (complete complements of genetic matter) can be grouped into distinctive types. Each type has been given a name, A, B, and D. Grasses sharing the same genome will be more-or-less interfertile, and might be treated by botanists as one species. Identification of genome types is obviously a valuable tool in investigating hybridisation. For example, if two diploid plants hybridise to form a new polyploid form (an allopolyploid), the two original genomes will be present in the new form. Many thousands of years after the original hybridisation event, identification of the component genomes will allow identification of the original parent species.

In Triticum, five genomes, all originally found in diploid species, have been identified:

- A^{m}, also called A^{b} – present in wild einkorn (T. boeoticum).
- A – present in T. urartu (closely related to T. boeoticum but not interfertile).
- B – present in most tetraploid wheats. Source not identified, but similar to Ae. speltoides.
- G – present in timopheevii group of wheats. Source not identified, but similar to Ae. speltoides.
- D – present in Ae. tauschii, and thus in all hexaploid wheats.

The genetic approach to wheat taxonomy (see below) takes the genome composition as defining each species. As there are five known combinations in Triticum this translates into five super species:

- A^{m} T. monococcum
- A^{u} T. urartu
- BA^{u} T. turgidum
- GA^{m} T. timopheevii
- BA^{u}D, T. aestivum

For a larger list of genome names, see Triticeae § Genetics.

=== Domestication ===
There are four wild species, all growing in rocky habitats in the Fertile Crescent of the Near East. All the other species are domesticated. Although relatively few genes control domestication, and wild and domesticated forms are interfertile, wild and domesticated wheats occupy entirely separate habitats. Traditional classification gives more weight to domesticated status.

=== Hulled vs. free-threshing ===
All wild wheats are hulled: they have tough glumes (husks) that tightly enclose the grains. Each package of glumes, lemma and palaea, and grains is known as a spikelet. At maturity the rachis (central stalk of the cereal ear) disarticulates, allowing the spikelets to disperse.

The first domesticated wheats, einkorn and emmer, were hulled like their wild ancestors, but with rachises that (while not entirely tough) did not disarticulate at maturity. During the Pre-Pottery Neolithic B period, at about 8000 BC, free-threshing forms of wheat evolved, with light glumes and fully tough rachis.

Hulled or free-threshing status is important in traditional classification because the different forms are usually grown separately, and have very different post-harvesting processing. Hulled wheats need substantial extra pounding or milling to remove the tough glumes.

=== Morphology ===
In addition to hulled/free-threshing status, other morphological criteria, e.g. spike laxness or glume wingedness, are important in defining wheat forms. Some of these are covered in the individual species accounts linked from this page, but Floras must be consulted for full descriptions and identification keys.

== Traditional vs. genetic classifications ==
Although the range of recognised types of wheat has been reasonably stable since the 1930s, there are now sharply differing views as to whether these should be recognised at species level (traditional approach) or at subspecific level (genetic approach). The first advocate of the genetic approach was Bowden, in a 1959 classification (now historic rather than current). He, and subsequent proponents (usually geneticists), argued that forms that were interfertile should be treated as one species (the biological species concept). Thus emmer and hard wheat should both be treated as subspecies (or at other infraspecific ranks) of a single tetraploid species defined by the genome BA^{u}. Van Slageren's 1994 classification is probably the most widely used genetic-based classification at present.

Users of traditional classifications give more weight to the separate habitats of the traditional species, which means that species that could hybridise do not, and to morphological characters. There are also pragmatic arguments for this type of classification: it means that most species can be described in Latin binomials, e.g. Triticum aestivum, rather than the trinomials necessary in the genetic system, e.g. T. a. subsp. aestivum. Both approaches are widely used.

== Infraspecific classification ==
In the nineteenth century, elaborate schemes of classification were developed in which wheat ears were classified to botanical variety on the basis of morphological criteria such as glume hairiness and colour or grain colour. These variety names are now largely abandoned, but are still sometimes used for distinctive types of wheat such as miracle wheat, a form of T. turgidum with branched ears, known as T. t. L. var. mirabile Körn.

The term "cultivar" (abbreviated as cv.) is often confused with "species" or "domesticate". In fact, it has a precise meaning in botany: it is the term for a distinct population of a crop, usually commercial and resulting from deliberate plant-breeding. Cultivar names are always capitalised, often placed between apostrophes, and not italicised. An example of a cultivar name is T. aestivum cv. 'Pioneer 2163'. A cultivar is often referred to by farmers as a variety, but this is best avoided in print, because of the risk of confusion with botanical varieties. The term "landrace" is applied to informal, farmer-maintained populations of crop plants.

== Naming ==
Botanical names for wheat are generally expected to follow an existing classification, such as those listed as current by the Wheat Genetics Resource Center . The classifications given in the following table are among those suitable for use. If a genetic classification is favoured, the GRIN classification is comprehensive, based on van Slageren's work but with some extra taxa recognised. If the traditional classification is favoured, Dorofeev's work is a comprehensive scheme that meshes well with other less complete treatments. Wikipedia's wheat pages generally follow a version of the Dorofeev scheme – see the taxobox on the Wheat page.

A general rule is that different taxonomic schemes should not be mixed in one context. In a given article, book or web page, only one scheme should be used at a time. Otherwise, it will be unclear to others how the botanical name is being used.

== Table of wheat species ==
		Wheat taxonomy – two schemes
Common name	Genome(s)	Genetic	Traditional (Dorofeev et al. 1979)
Diploid (2x), wild, hulled
Wild einkorn	A^{m}	Triticum monococcum L. subsp. aegilopoides (Link) Thell.	Triticum boeoticum Boiss.
	A^{u}	Triticum urartu Tumanian ex Gandilyan	Triticum urartu Tumanian ex Gandilyan
Diploid (2x), domesticated, hulled
Einkorn	A^{m}	Triticum monococcum L. subsp. monococcum	Triticum monococcum L.
Tetraploid (4x), wild, hulled
Wild emmer	BA^{u}	Triticum turgidum L. subsp. dicoccoides (Korn. ex Asch. & Graebn.) Thell.	Triticum dicoccoides (Körn. ex Asch. & Graebner) Schweinf.
Tetraploid (4x), domesticated, hulled
Emmer	BA^{u}	Triticum turgidum L. subsp. dicoccum (Schrank ex Schübl.) Thell.	Triticum dicoccum Schrank ex Schübler
	BA^{u}	Triticum ispahanicum Heslot	Triticum ispahanicum Heslot
	BA^{u}	Triticum turgidum L. subsp. paleocolchicum Á. & D. Löve	Triticum karamyschevii Nevski
Tetraploid (4x), domesticated, free-threshing
Durum or macaroni wheat	BA^{u}	Triticum turgidum L. subsp. durum (Desf.) Husn.	Triticum durum Desf.
Rivet, cone or English wheat	BA^{u}	Triticum turgidum L. subsp. turgidum	Triticum turgidum L.
Polish wheat	BA^{u}	Triticum turgidum L. subsp. polonicum (L.) Thell.	Triticum polonicum L.
Khorasan wheat	BA^{u}	Triticum turgidum L. subsp. turanicum (Jakubz.) Á. & D. Löve	Triticum turanicum Jakubz.
Persian wheat	BA^{u}	Triticum turgidum L. subsp. carthlicum (Nevski) Á. & D. Löve	Triticum carthlicum Nevski in Kom.
Tetraploid (4x) – timopheevi group
Wild, hulled
	GA^{m}	Triticum timopheevii (Zhuk.) Zhuk. subsp. armeniacum (Jakubz.) Slageren	Triticum araraticum Jakubz.
Domesticated, hulled
	GA^{m}	Triticum timopheevii (Zhuk.) Zhuk. subsp. timopheevii	Triticum timopheevii (Zhuk.) Zhuk.
Hexaploid (6x), domesticated, hulled
Spelt wheat	BA^{u}D	Triticum aestivum L. subsp. spelta (L.) Thell.	Triticum spelta L.
Makha wheat	BA^{u}D	Triticum aestivum L. subsp. macha (Dekapr. & A. M. Menabde) Mackey	Triticum macha Dekapr. & Menabde
	BA^{u}D	Triticum vavilovii Jakubz.	Triticum vavilovii (Tumanian) Jakubz.
Hexaploid (6x), domesticated, free-threshing
Common or bread wheat	BA^{u}D	Triticum aestivum L. subsp. aestivum	Triticum aestivum L.
Club wheat	BA^{u}D	Triticum aestivum L. subsp. compactum (Host) Mackey	Triticum compactum Host
Indian dwarf or shot wheat	BA^{u}D	Triticum aestivum L. subsp. sphaerococcum (Percival) Mackey	Triticum sphaerococcum Percival

Note: Blank common name indicates that no common name is in use in the English language.

=== Explanatory notes on selected names ===
- Triticum boeoticum Boiss. is sometimes divided into two subspecies:
  - T. boeoticum Boiss. subsp. thaoudar (Reut. ex Hausskn.) E. Schiem. – with two grains in each spikelet, distributed to east of fertile crescent.
  - T. boeoticum Boiss. subsp. boeoticum – one grain in each spikelet, in Balkans.
- Triticum dicoccum Schrank ex Schübler is also known as Triticum dicoccon Schrank.
- Triticum aethiopicum Jakubz. is a variant form of T. durum found in Ethiopia. It is not usually regarded as a separate species.
- Triticum karamyschevii Nevsky was previously known as Triticum paleocolchicum A. M. Menabde.

== Artificial species and mutants ==
Russian botanists have given botanical names to hybrids developed during genetic experiments. As these only occur in the laboratory environment, it is questionable whether botanical names (rather than lab. numbers) are justified. Botanical names have also been given to rare mutant forms. Examples include:

- Triticum × borisovii Zhebrak – (T. aestivum × T. timopheevi)
- Triticum × fungicidum Zhuk. – Hexaploid, artificial cross (T. carthlicum × T. timopheevi)
- Triticum jakubzineri Udachin & Shakhm.
- Triticum militinae Zhuk. & Migush. – mutant form of T. timopheevi.
- Triticum petropavlovskyi Udachin & Migush.
- Triticum sinskajae Filat. & Kurkiev – mutant, free-threshing form of T. monococcum.
- Triticum × timococcum Kostov
- Triticum timonovum Heslot & Ferrary – Hexaploid, artificial cross.
- Triticum zhukovskyi Menabde & Ericzjan (T. timopheevi × T. monococcum): 6N

== See also ==
- Winter wheat vs. spring wheat
- Cultivated plant taxonomy
- List of Canadian Heritage Wheat Varieties

== Sources ==
- Caligari, P.D.S.; Brandham, P.E., eds. (2001). Wheat taxonomy: the legacy of John Percival (PDF) (Linnean Special Issue 3 ed.). London: Linnean Society. p. 190.
- Percival, John (1921). The wheat plant: a monograph. London: Duckworth.
- Padulosi, Stefano, Karl Hammer and J. Heller (1996). Hulled Wheats. Promoting the conservation and use of underutilized and neglected crops. 4. Proceedings of the First International Workshop on Hulled Wheats 21 July 1995 – 22 July 1995, Castelvecchio Pascoli, Tuscany, Italy. Bioversity International. ISBN 978-92-9043-288-3. Archived from the original on January 14, 2006.
- "Wheat Classification Tables Site". Archived from the original on March 10, 2000. Lists of Triticum names. An essential tool.
- "GRIN taxonomy: Triticum". Includes links to USDA germplasm collection, and public domain images Germplasm Resources Information Network (GRIN)
- "Triticum taxonomy". Mansfeld's World Database of Agricultural and Horticultural Crops.
