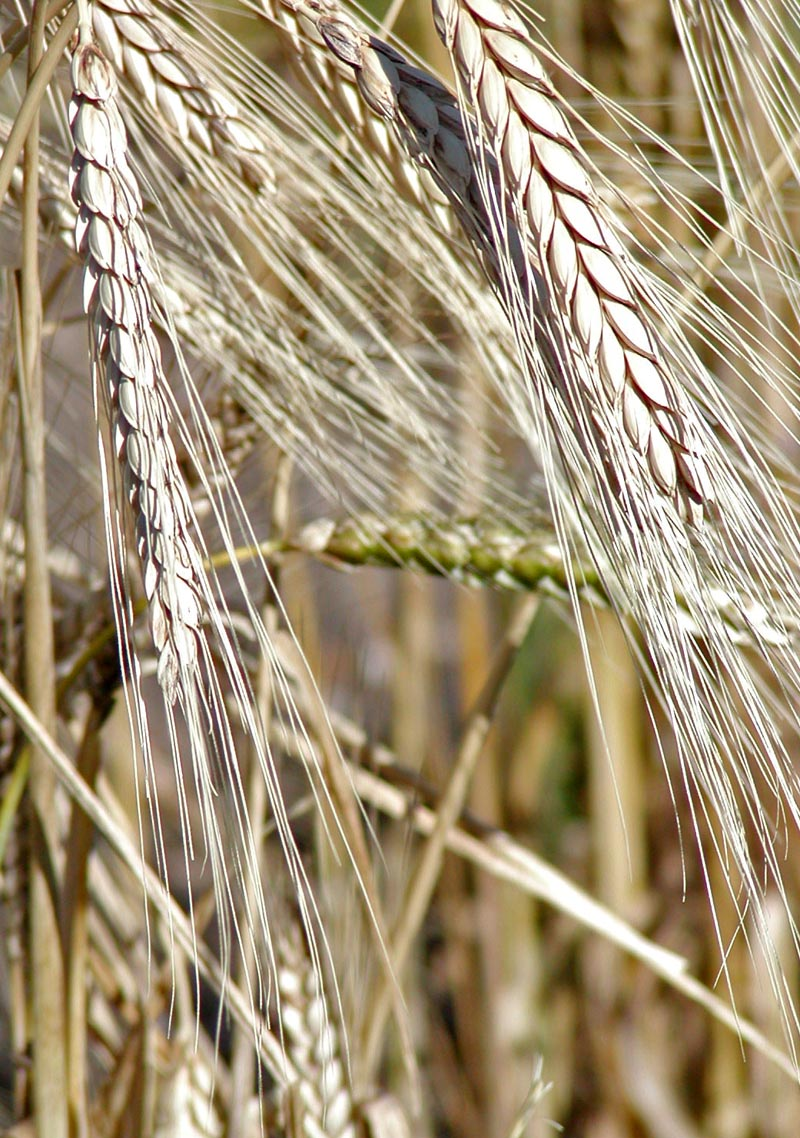

Scientific classification
- Kingdom: Plantae
- Clade: Tracheophytes
- Clade: Angiosperms
- Clade: Monocots
- Clade: Commelinids
- Order: Poales
- Family: Poaceae
- Subfamily: Pooideae
- Genus: Triticum
- Species: T. turanicum

Binomial name
- Triticum turanicum Jakubz.

Synonyms
- Gigachilon polonicum subsp. turanicum (Jakubz.) Á.Löve; Triticum durum subsp. turanicum (Jakubz.) L.B.Cai; T. orientale Percival (nom. illeg.); T. percivalianum Parodi; T. percivalii E.Schiem.; T. turgidum subsp. turanicum (Jakubz.) Á.Löve & D.Löve

= Khorasan wheat =

Species of grass

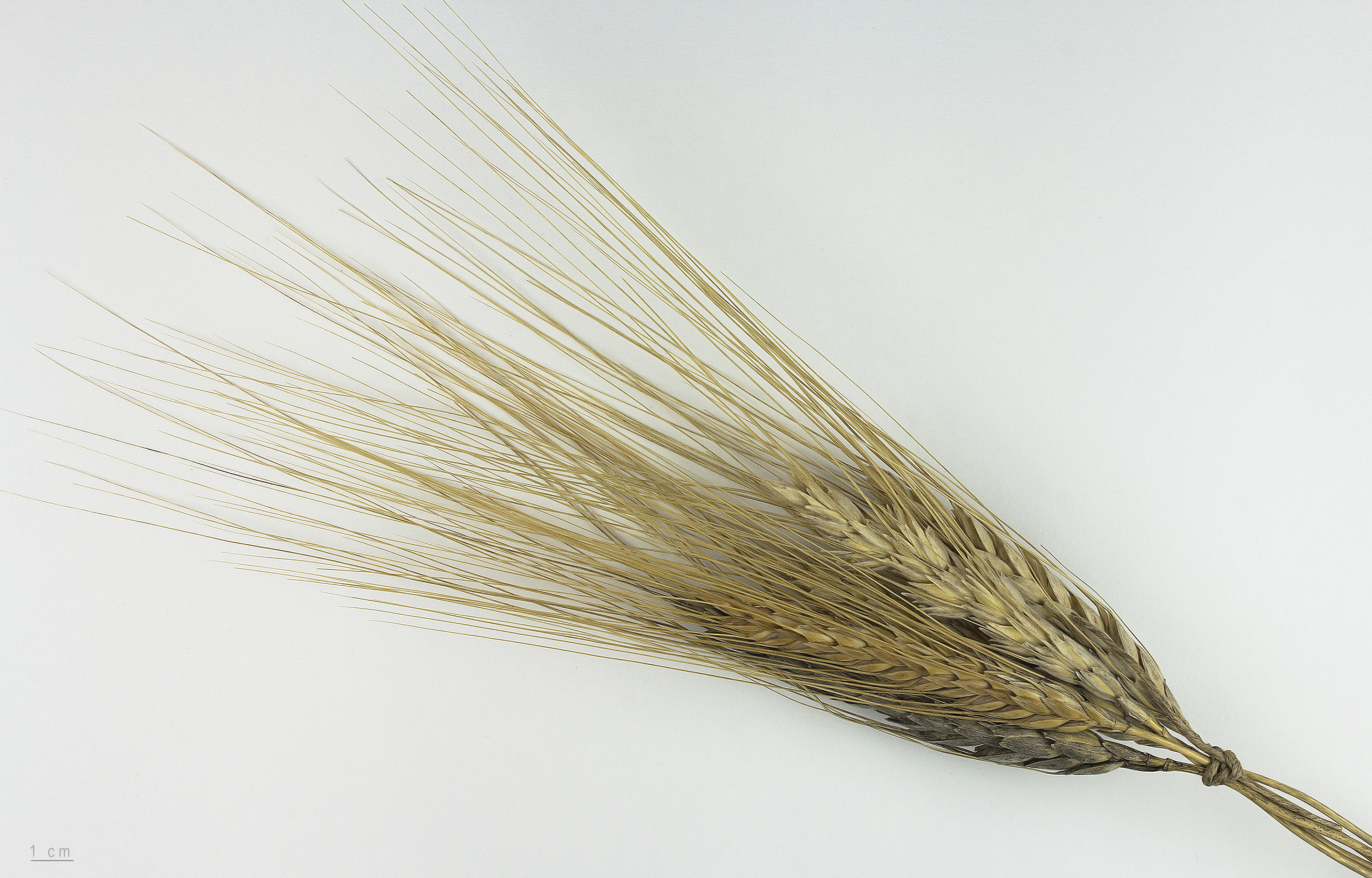
Triticum turgidum subsp. turanicum

Khorasan wheat or Oriental wheat (Triticum turgidum subsp. turanicum, also called Triticum turanicum) is a tetraploid wheat species. The grain is twice the size of modern-day wheat, and has a rich, nutty flavor.

== Description ==
As an annual, self-fertilized grass that is cultivated for its grains, Khorasan wheat looks very similar to common wheat. However, its grains are twice the size of modern wheat kernel, with a thousand-kernel weight of up to 60 grams (2.1 ounces). They contain more proteins, lipids, amino acids, vitamins and minerals than modern wheat. The grain has an amber colour and a high vitreousness.

== Taxonomy ==
Original botanical identifications were uncertain. The variety is a form of Triticum turgidum subsp. turanicum (also known as Triticum turanicum), usually called Khorasan wheat. Khorasan is a province in Iran. Identifications sometimes seen as T. polonicum are incorrect as the variety, although long-grained, lacks the long glumes of this species. Recent genetic evidence from DNA fingerprinting suggests that the variety is perhaps derived from a natural hybrid between T. durum and T. polonicum, which would explain past difficulties in arriving at a certain classification.

== History ==
The grain is named after Khorasan—a historical region of the eastern Iranian plateau which includes the modern provinces of North, South, and Razavi Khorasan (unified as Khorasan Province until 2004) in the Islamic Republic of Iran, parts of Turkmenistan, Afghanistan, and Central Asia. Ancient grains like Khorasan wheat were likely cultivated in or traded through this region, which was a significant part of the Silk Road. In the modern awareness and market for Khorasan wheat involves its rediscovery and import to the United States in the mid-20th century, where it was cultivated by Montana wheat and cattle farmer T. Mack Quinn and his son Bob, then an agricultural scientist at the University of California, Davis. The younger Quinn started a company, Kamut International, and trademarked "Kamut" as a particular branding of Khorasan wheat with organic cultivation requirements.

== Cultivation and distribution ==
Khorasan wheat is a minor component of the global ancient grains market, with estimates ranging from 35,000 to 100,000 acres over the last decade, mostly grown in Montana and Canada under licensing with Kamut International. It is also grown to a lesser extent in Italy, where the bulk of the global market resides.

The cultivation practices are quite similar to other wheat species, especially durum. As most of the Khorasan wheat is organically produced, the nutrient supply (especially nitrogen) is supplied mainly by crop rotation, such as previous pasture legumes.

Harvest in general follows the same procedure as in the other wheat species. Contrary to common wheat, khorasan wheat seeds are very brittle and crack in half very easily, which leads to a necessarily more gentle harvest and post-harvest treatment.

=== Requirements for climate and soil ===
A temperate continental climate with cold nights in the early spring (see vernalisation), low to moderate precipitation rates (0.5 to 1m per year), and a warm summer for optimal ripening are the preferred climatic conditions of khorasan wheat. These conditions are very similar to those of durum wheat, which originates in the same region. But, because breeding efforts for khorasan wheat have been very sparse, its adaptation to other climatic conditions is still limited. It is especially known for its drought tolerance, which is even better than that of durum wheat. Too much precipitation, especially in the end of the season, can lead to dramatic disease problems. Soils typically used for khorasan wheat are the same as for durum wheat: deep friable black clays with a certain water storing capacity, also known as vertisols.

=== Diseases ===
The range of diseases in khorasan wheat is more or less the same as in all other wheat species. Main diseases are typically caused by fungi, such as the Fusarium head blight or the "black tip". Khorasan wheat has been found very susceptible to Fusarium head blight.

Because of the high susceptibility to fungi, crop rotation is quite important, especially under organic production conditions. The rotation requirements resemble more or less those of durum wheat. Depending on the specific production setting, Khorasan production after maize or other cereals should be avoided. Typical robust rotations would contain some of the following crops: canola, sunflower, pulses, sorghum and pasture legumes.

== Uses ==
Khorasan wheat is used similarly as modern wheat. Its grains can be consumed whole, or milled into flour. It can be found in breads, bread mixes, breakfast cereals, cookies, waffles, pancakes, bulgur, baked goods, pastas, drinks, beer, and snacks. Khorasan wheat is recognized for its smooth texture and nutty, buttery flavor.

== Nutrition ==
=== Nutrients ===
Khorasan wheat, uncooked
Nutritional value per 100 g (3.5 oz)
- Energy: 1,411 kJ (337 kcal)
- Carbohydrates: 70.38 g
- Starch: 52.41 g
- Dietary fiber: 9.1 g
- Fat: 2.2 g
- Saturated: 0.192 g
- Monounsaturated: 0.214 g
- Polyunsaturated: 0.616 g
- Protein: 14.7 g
Vitamins and minerals
Vitamins	Quantity %DV^{†}
Thiamine (B1)	49% 0.591 mg
Riboflavin (B2)	14% 0.178 mg
Niacin (B3)	40% 6.35 mg
Pantothenic acid (B5)	18% 0.9 mg
Vitamin B6	15% 0.255 mg
Vitamin E	4% 0.6 mg
Minerals	Quantity %DV^{†}
Iron	25% 4.41 mg
Magnesium	32% 134 mg
Manganese	124% 2.86 mg
Phosphorus	31% 386 mg
Potassium	15% 446 mg
Zinc	33% 3.68 mg
- Other constituents: Quantity
- Water: 10.95 g
- ^{†}Percentages estimated using US recommendations for adults, except for potassium, which is estimated based on expert recommendation from the National Academies.

In a 100-gram (3 1/2-ounce) reference serving, khorasan wheat provides 1,410 kilojoules (337 kilocalories) of food energy and is a rich source (more than 19% of the Daily Value, DV) of numerous essential nutrients, including protein (29% DV), dietary fiber (46% DV), several B vitamins and dietary minerals, especially manganese (136% DV) (table). Khorasan wheat is 11% water, 70% carbohydrates, 2% fat and 15% protein (table). Khorasan wheat has high protein content which improves its vitreousness which indicates a high milling yield.

=== Health effects ===
As khorasan wheat contains gluten, it is unsuitable for people with gluten-related disorders, such as celiac disease, non-celiac gluten sensitivity and wheat allergy sufferers, among others.

== See also ==
- Durum
- Einkorn
- Emmer
- Spelt
