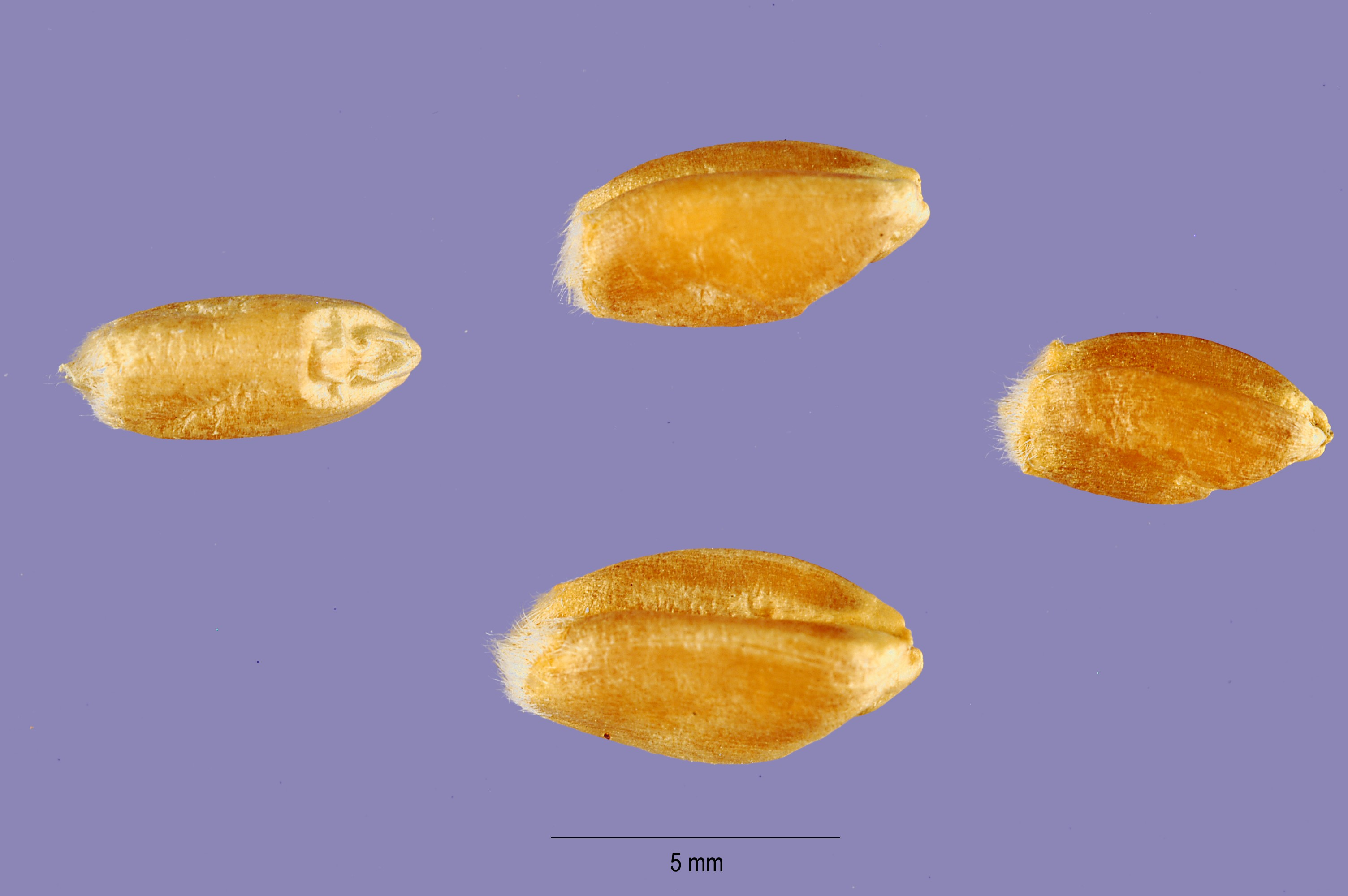

Scientific classification
- Kingdom: Plantae
- Clade: Embryophytes
- Clade: Tracheophytes
- Clade: Angiosperms
- Clade: Monocots
- Clade: Commelinids
- Order: Poales
- Family: Poaceae
- Subfamily: Pooideae
- Genus: Triticum
- Species: T. carthlicum

Binomial name
- Triticum carthlicum Nevski, 1934

= Triticum carthlicum =

Persian wheat

Species of grass

Triticum carthlicum Nevski, 1934, the Persian wheat, is a wheat with a tetraploid genome.

Some scholars refer to it as T. turgidum subspecies carthlicum. Recent research suggest that T. carthlicum originated from a cross between domesticated emmer wheat and T. aestivum.

== Diseases ==
T. carthlicum is the source of Pm4b, a resistance gene encoding a MCTP kinase used in hexaploid wheat. Pmb4 confers powdery mildew resistance.

== Bibliography ==
- E. R. Kerber; V. M. Bendelow (1977). "The Role of Triticum carthlicum in the Origin of Bread Wheat Based on Comparative Milling and Baking Properties". Canadian Journal of Plant Science. 57 (2): 367–373. doi:10.4141/cjps77-053.
- W. Bushuk; E. R. Kerber (1978). "The Role of Triticum carthlicum in the Origin of Bread Wheat Based on Gliadin Electrophoregrams". Canadian Journal of Plant Science. 58 (4): 1019–1024. doi:10.4141/cjps78-155.
