= John Percival (botanist) =

- Born: 3 April 1863; Carperby, Yorkshire
- Died: 26 January 1949 (aged 85)
- Known for: Agricultural Botany, Theoretical and Practical (1900); The Wheat Plant (1921)
- Scientific career
- Fields: Botany
- Author abbrev. (botany): Percival

John Percival FLS (1863–1949) was an English botanist and professor of agricultural botany, known for his research on the genera Triticum and Aegilops, as well as the taxonomy of wheat.

== Biography ==
After education from 1868 to 1877 at the National school in Aysgarth, John Percival, a Quaker, was employed at the York Glass Works, owned at that time by a Quaker family named Spence. Percival worked there from 1877 to 1884. Mrs T. A. (Charlotte) Cotton, a member of the Spence family, endowed him with a scholarship. He matriculated on 13 October 1884 at St John's College, Cambridge. He graduated there with B.A. in 1887, M.A. in 1891, and Sc.D. in 1922. From 1894 to 1903 he was a professor of botany at the Agricultural College at Wye in Kent. At University College, Reading, he was director of the Agricultural Department from 1903 to 1907 and professor of agricultural botany from 1907 to 1932. The Linnean Society elected him a Fellow in 1893 and a vice-president for 1926–1927. William Broadhurst Brierley was his successor in the professorship from which Percival retired in 1932.

Between 1907 and 1930 he vigorously extended the collection of European wheats which he had brought from Wye in 1902 to cover more than 40 countries in all parts of the world. This was done with the aid of the Board (later the Ministry) of Agriculture and the United Kingdom Foreign Office. British embassies and consular posts in wheat-growing countries were asked to obtain samples of ears and seeds representing the kinds of wheat grown in them. The samples suggested were 4–5 spikes and an ounce of seed. Samples of these collections are stored in 80 custom made wooden boxes in the University of Reading Herbarium.

Around 1928, Piotr M. Zhukovsky (Пётр Михайлович Жуковский) sent Percival a possibly complete collection of the species of the genus Aegilops. During WWII the Aegilops collection at Leningrad was destroyed, and John Jones in the late 1950s was able to send a complete set of Aegilops species to the USSR. Starting around 1927, Percival received numerous desiccated or carbonised samples of cereal grains from tombs or other archaeological sites in Egypt, the Near East, and western Asia. The samples and Percival's identifications were important in developing archaeobotany at the University of Reading.

On 17 August 1896 he married Ethel Elizabeth Hope-Johnstone. Alan Vivian Percival (born 1899) was their only child who survived to adulthood. Upon John Percival's death he was survived by his widow and son.

== Legacy ==
According to Laura A. Morrison, the modern era of wheat taxonomy began with three works: Die Geschichte der Kultivierten Getreide (1913) by August Schulz (1862–1922), Neuere Wege und Ziele der botanischen Systematik, erläutert am Beispiele unserer Getreidearten (1913) by Albert Thellung, and The Wheat Plant (1921) by Percival.

On the 12th and 13 July 1999, the University of Reading's School of Plant Sciences, in collaboration with the Linnean Society, held a symposium to celebrate Percival's life and work.

His monumental treatment of wheat The Wheat Plant: A Monograph (1921) still serves as a standard reference, having been reprinted as recently as 1974. Percival was the consummate agricultural scientist — botanist, taxonomist, geneticist, germplasm collector, curator, breeder, agronomist, historian and teacher.

== Selected publications ==
- Agricultural Botany, Theoretical and Practical. London: Duckworth & Co. 1900. 6th edition. Duckworth & co. 1921.
- Agricultural Bacteriology, Theoretical and Practical. London: Duckworth & Co. 1910.
- The Wheat Plant: A Monograph. London: Duckworth & Co. 1921.
- Wheat in Great Britain. 1934. (2nd edition, 1948)
