= Triticum araraticum =

Scientific classification
- Kingdom: Plantae
- Clade: Tracheophytes
- Clade: Angiosperms
- Clade: Monocots
- Clade: Commelinids
- Order: Poales
- Family: Poaceae
- Subfamily: Pooideae
- Genus: Triticum
- Species: T. araraticum

Binomial name
- Triticum araraticum Jakubz

Species of grass

Triticum araraticum (Araratian wild emmer or Armenian wild emmer) is a wild tetraploid species of wheat. T. araraticum is one of the least studied wheat species in the world.

== Genealogy ==
The T. araraticum species appears to have arisen from the natural hybridization of T. boeoticum and Aegilops speltoides. T. araraticum is similar to the domestic T. timopheevii in several ways including physical appearance, cytoplasm type and DNA content. The relationship has led some taxonomists to classify T. araraticum as a subspecies of T. timopheevii. In July 1988 different lines of T. araraticum were studied using the C-banding method revealing that T. araraticum was of genome composition AAGG.

== Geography ==
The araraticum subspecies of T. araraticum grows primarily in Armenia, Azerbaijan, Georgia, Iran, Iraq and Turkey, while the kurdistanicum subspecies grows in Iraq and the nearby areas of Iran and Turkey.

In Armenia, the subspecies can be found in Voghjaberd and Vedi villages near capital Yerevan and the villages of Areni, Arpi and Aghavnadzor in Vayots Dzor Province.
