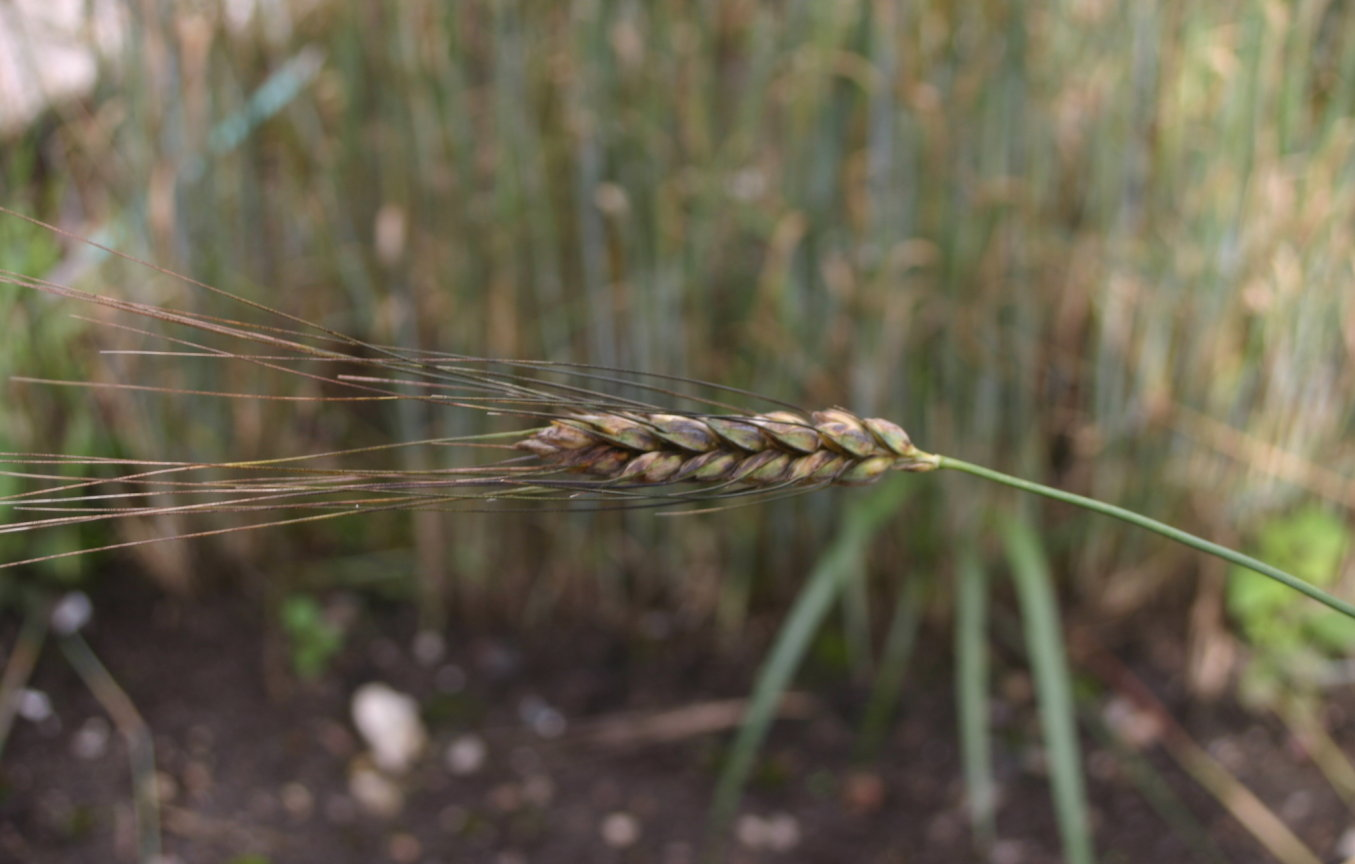

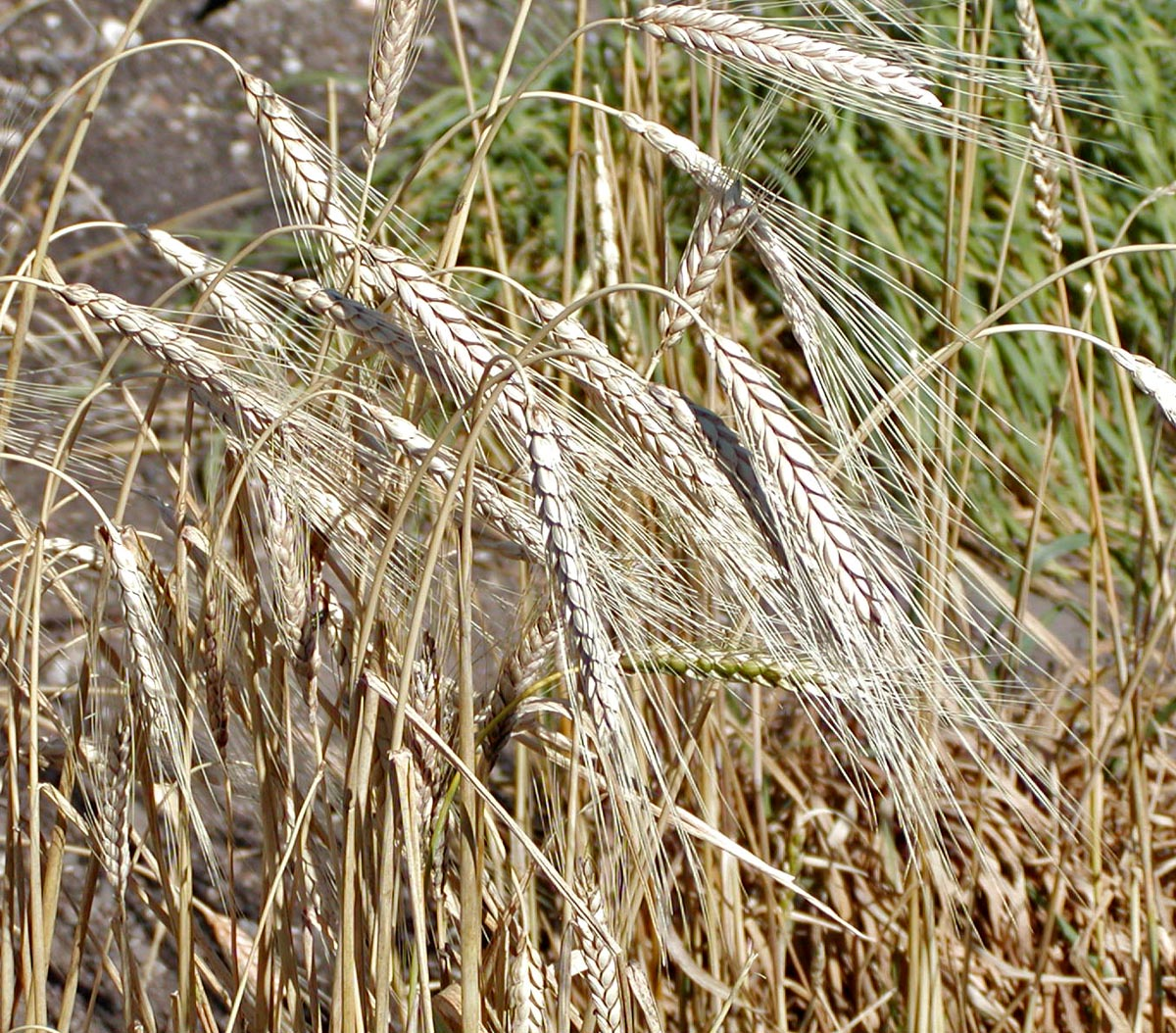

Conservation status
- Least Concern (IUCN 3.1)

Scientific classification
- Kingdom: Plantae
- Clade: Tracheophytes
- Clade: Angiosperms
- Clade: Monocots
- Clade: Commelinids
- Order: Poales
- Family: Poaceae
- Subfamily: Pooideae
- Genus: Triticum
- Species: T. turgidum

Binomial name
- Triticum turgidum L.

Synonyms
- List: Gigachilon polonicum subsp. turgidum (L.) Á.Löve in Feddes Repert. 95: 497 (1984); Triticum aestivum var. turgidum (L.) Fiori in A.Fiori & al., Fl. Anal. Italia 1: 108 (1896); Triticum aestivum subsp. turgidum (L.) Cout. in Fl. Portugal: 99 (1913); Triticum cereale var. turgidum (L.) Klett & Richt. in Fl. Leipzig: 118 (1830); Triticum cereale var. turgidum (L.) Baumg. in Enum. Stirp. Transsilv. 3: 266 (1816); Triticum durum subsp. turgidum (L.) Dorof. in Sel'skokhoz. Biol. 3: 456 (1968); Triticum polonicum var. turgidum (L.) Pers. in Syn. Pl. 1: 109 (1805); Triticum sativum var. turgidum (L.) Delile in Descr. Egypte, Hist. Nat. 2(Mém.): 53, 177 (1813); Triticum sativum subsp. turgidum (L.) K.Richt. in Pl. Eur. 1: 129 (1890), nom. illeg.; Triticum vulgare convar. turgidum (L.) Alef. in Landw. Fl.: 325 (1866); Triticum vulgare var. turgidum (L.) Spreng. in Syst. Veg., ed. 16. 1: 323 (1824); Triticum vulgare subsp. turgidum (L.) Bonnier & Layens in Tabl. Syn. Pl. Vasc. France: 370 (1894)

= Triticum turgidum =

Species of plant

- Triticum turgidum
- seven-eared Triticum turgidum with Claudio Grossi

Triticum turgidum (with its various subspecies being known as pasta wheat, macaroni wheat and durum wheat) is a species of wheat. It is an annual and grows primarily in temperate areas and is native to countries around the eastern Mediterranean, down to Iran and east to Xinjiang, China.

== Taxonomy ==
It was first published and described by Carl Linnaeus in his book Species Plantarum on page 86 in 1753. One is known as rivet wheat. One is known as poulard wheat.

== Distribution ==
It is native to the countries of Egypt, Iran, Iraq, Kazakhstan, Kyrgyzstan, Lebanon, North Caucasus (parts of Russia), Syria, Palestine, Transcaucasus (or South Caucasus; Armenia, Georgia, and Azerbaijan), Turkey, Turkmenistan, Uzbekistan and Xinjiang, China.

It has been introduced into many places, including within Europe (Albania, Austria, Belarus, Bulgaria, Corsica, Crete, Cyprus, Czechia, Denmark, East Aegean Islands, France, Germany, Great Britain, Greece, Hungary, Italy, Madeira, Netherlands, Poland, Portugal, Romania, Sardinia, Sicily, Slovakia, Spain, Sweden, Switzerland, Ukraine and Yugoslavia); Africa (in Algeria, Canary Islands, Central African Republic, Ethiopia, Mauritania, Morocco, Sudan, Tunisia and Zimbabwe); Central Asia (Afghanistan, Libya, Oman, Saudi Arabia, Tajikistan, Turkey, West Himalaya and Yemen); parts of Russia (Central European Russia, Crimea, East European Russia, North European Russia, Northwest European Russia, South European Russia and West Siberia); Asia (Assam, Bangladesh, China, India, Myanmar, Pakistan and Tibet); and parts of America (within Alberta (Canada), Honduras (South America), Manitoba (Canada), Mexico (northeast and northwestern), New York (US), Ontario and Saskatchewan (Canada)).

== Accepted subspecies ==
There are eight subspecies as accepted by Plants of the World Online:

- Triticum turgidum subsp. carthlicum (Nevski) Á.Löve
- Triticum turgidum subsp. dicoccoides (Asch. & Graebn.) Thell.
- Triticum turgidum subsp. dicoccum (Schrank ex Schübl.) Thell.
- Triticum turgidum subsp. durum (Desf.) Husn.
- Triticum turgidum subsp. georgicum (Dekapr. & Menabde) Mackey ex Hanelt
- Triticum turgidum subsp. polonicum (L.) Thell.
- Triticum turgidum subsp. turanicum (Jakubz.) Á.Löve
- Triticum turgidum subsp. turgidum

Triticum turgidum subsp. dicoccoides is thought to be the wild progenitor of cultivated tetraploid wheat. It is distributed over large areas of the Middle East which have dry and saline soils (Nevo et al., 1992).

Triticum turgidum subsp. durum (2n = 28, AABB) is the most commonly cultivated form of allotetraploid wheat and is grown on 8% of the world's wheat area (FAOStat,). It originated in the Mediterranean region and is used to make pasta and semolina products (Ren et al).

Triticum turgidum subsp. turanicum is usually ground into a flour and used as a cereal for making bread, biscuits etc.
