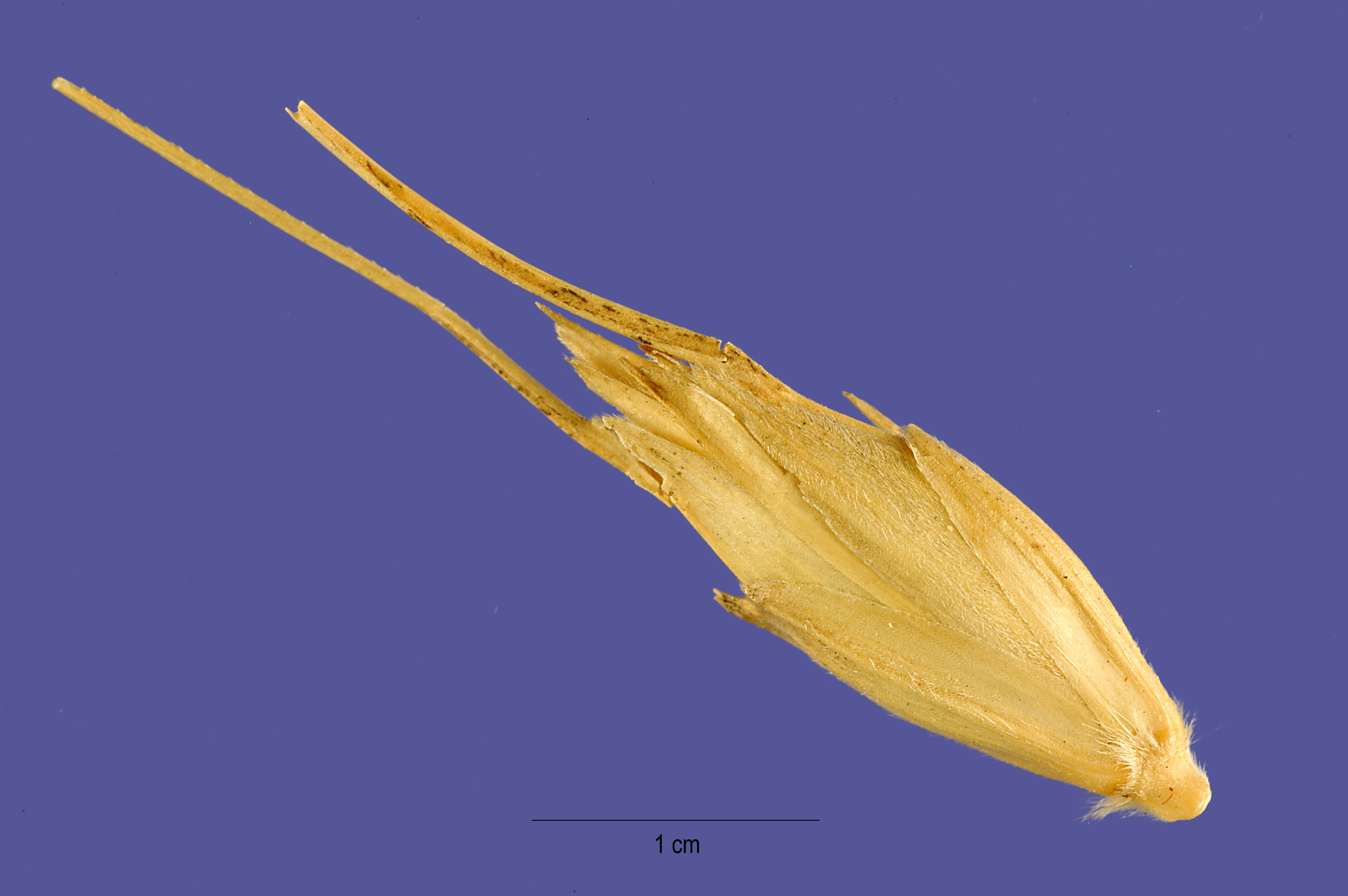

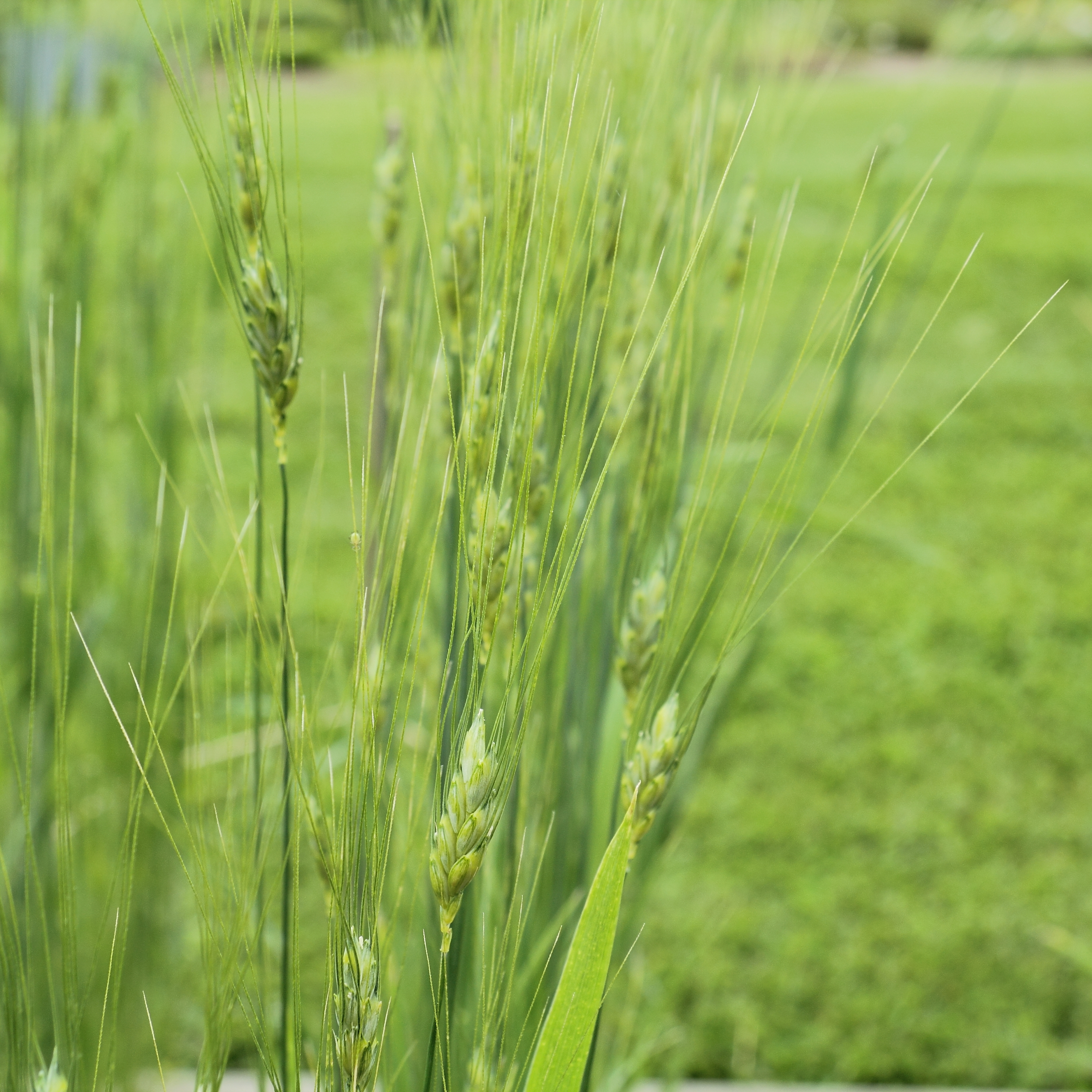

Scientific classification
- Kingdom: Plantae
- Clade: Tracheophytes
- Clade: Angiosperms
- Clade: Monocots
- Clade: Commelinids
- Order: Poales
- Family: Poaceae
- Subfamily: Pooideae
- Genus: Triticum
- Species: T. timopheevii

Binomial name
- Triticum timopheevii Zhuk.

= Triticum timopheevii =

Species of grass

Triticum timopheevii, Timopheev's wheat or Zanduri wheat (from Georgian ზანდური), is a tetraploid wheat that has both cultivated and wild forms. It is believed to have evolved in isolation from the more common Triticum turgidum; hybrids between T. timopheevii and T. turgidum are reportedly sterile with "a considerable amount of chromosomal irregularities in meiosis."

The wild form (formerly categorized as T. araraticum Jakubz.) can be found across south-eastern Turkey, north Iraq, west Iran and Transcaucasia - but the domesticated form is restricted to western Georgia.
