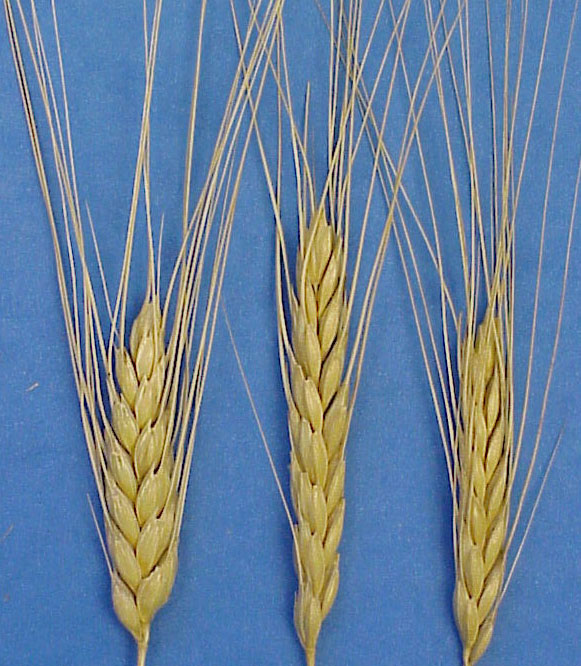
- Spikes (ears) of cultivated emmer

Conservation status
- Least Concern (IUCN 3.1)

Scientific classification
- Kingdom: Plantae
- Clade: Tracheophytes
- Clade: Angiosperms
- Clade: Monocots
- Clade: Commelinids
- Order: Poales
- Family: Poaceae
- Subfamily: Pooideae
- Genus: Triticum
- Species: T. dicoccum

Binomial name
- Triticum dicoccum Schrank ex Schübl.

Synonyms
- List: Spelta amylea (Ser.) Ser.; Triticum amyleum Ser.; Triticum armeniacum (Stolet.) Nevski; Triticum arras Hochst.; Triticum atratum Host; Triticum cienfuegos Lag.; Triticum dicoccum Schrank.; Triticum dicoccoides; Triticum farrum Bayle-Bar.; Triticum gaertnerianum Lag.; Triticum immaturatum Flaksb. nom. inval.; Triticum ispahanicum Heslot; Triticum karamyschevii Nevski; Triticum maturatum Flaksb. nom. inval.; Triticum palaecocolchicum (Menabde) L.B. Cai; Triticum palaeocolchicum Menabde; Triticum subspontaneum (Tzvelev) Czerep.; Triticum tricoccum Schübl.; Triticum volgense (Flaksb.) Nevski

= Emmer =

Type of wheat

Emmer is a hybrid species of wheat. Along with einkorn, it was one of the first crops domesticated in the Near East. It was widely cultivated in the ancient world, but is now a relict crop in mountainous regions of Europe and Asia. Emmer is one of the three grains called farro in Italy.

The edible seeds have been used as food since ancient times. The domesticated types are Triticum turgidum subsp. dicoccum and Triticum turgidum subsp. durum. The wild plant is called Triticum dicoccoides. The seeds have an awned covering, the sharp spikes helping the seeds to become buried in the ground. The principal difference between the wild and the domestic forms is that the ripened seed head of the wild plant shatters and scatters the seed onto the ground, while in the domesticated emmer, the seed head remains intact, thus making it easier to harvest the grain.

== Etymology ==
Emmer is first attested in 1908 in English as a loanword from German Emmer, variant of Amelkorn, from amel, 'starch', likely from Latin amylum, itself borrowing from Ancient Greek amylon.

== Description ==
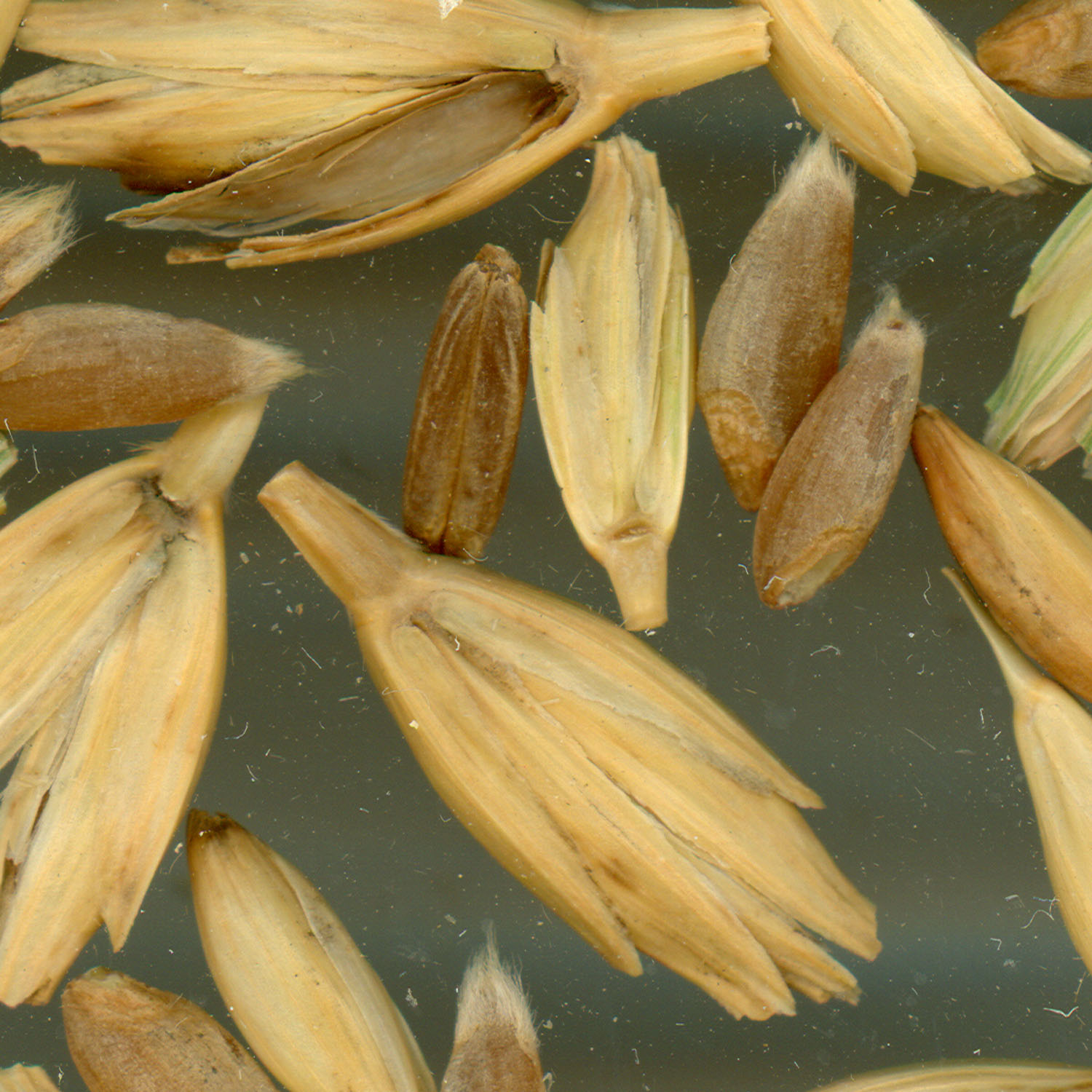
Harvested emmer has shattered into spikelets, the husks remaining around the seeds.

Like einkorn (T. monococcum) and spelt (T. spelta), emmer is a hulled wheat, meaning it has strong glumes (husks) that enclose the grains, and a semibrittle rachis. On threshing, a hulled wheat spike breaks up into spikelets that require milling or pounding to release the grains from the glumes. Wild emmer spikelets effectively self-cultivate by propelling themselves mechanically into soils with their awns. During a period of increased humidity during the night, the awns of the spikelet become erect and draw together, and in the process push the grain into the soil. During the daytime, the humidity drops and the awns slacken back again; however, fine silica hairs on the awns act as hooks in the soil and prevent the spikelets from backing out. During the course of alternating stages of daytime drying and nighttime humidity, the awns' pumping movements, which resemble a swimming frog kick, will drill the spikelet 25 millimetres (1 inch) or more into the soil.

== Evolution ==
=== Taxonomy and phylogeny ===
Wild emmer is one of the ancestors of bread wheat; both species are hybrids.

Strong similarities in morphology and genetics show that wild emmer (T. dicoccoides Koern.) is the wild ancestor and a crop wild relative of domesticated emmer. Wild emmer still grows wild in the Near East. It is a tetraploid wheat formed by the hybridization of two diploid wild grasses, wild red einkorn (Triticum urartu), and the goatgrass Aegilops speltoides.

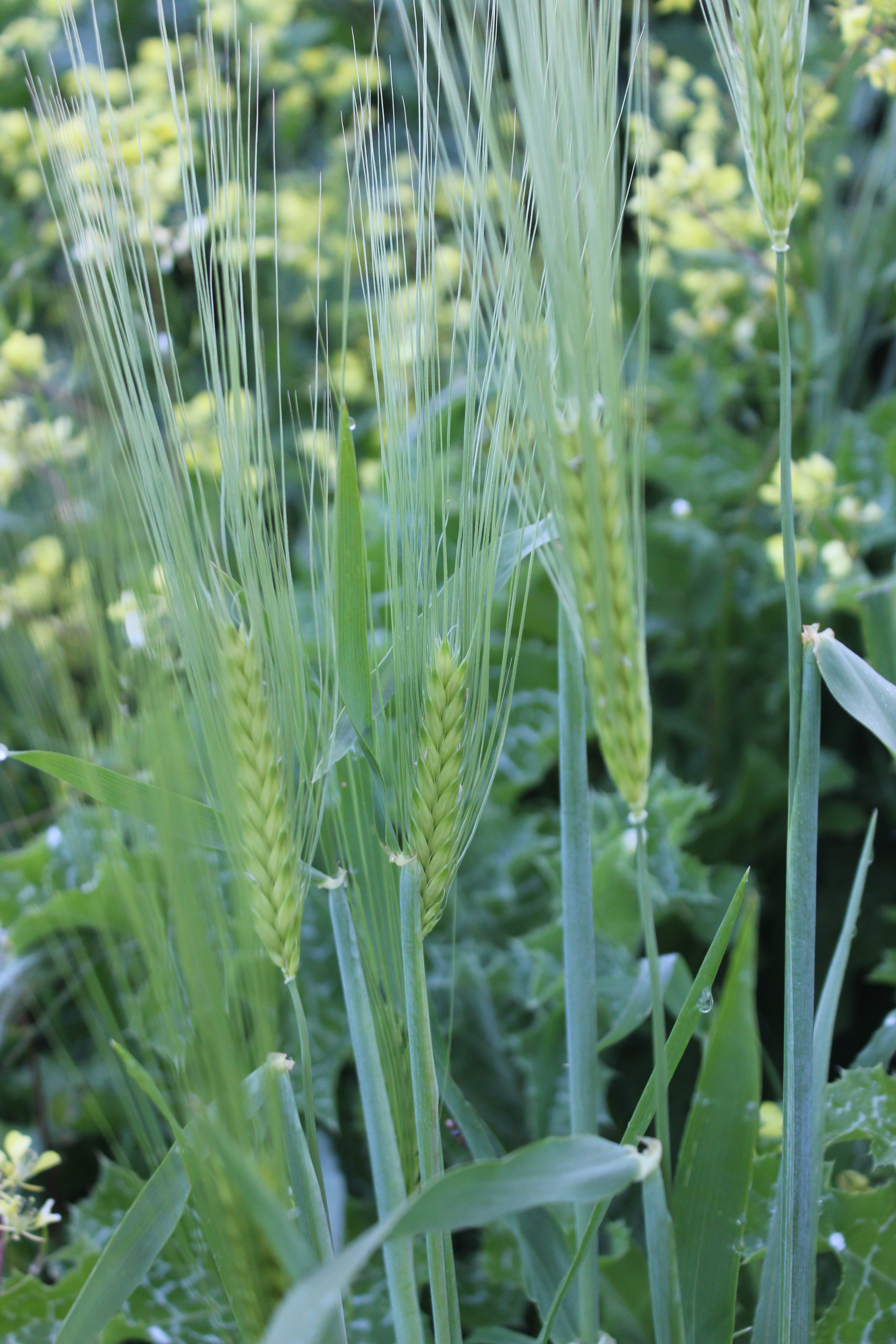
Wild emmer still grows in the Near East.

The botanists Friedrich August Körnicke and Aaron Aaronsohn in the late 19th-century were the first to describe the wild emmer native to Palestine and adjacent countries. Earlier, in 1864, the Austrian botanist Carl Friedrich Kotschy collected specimens of the same wild emmer, without stating where he had collected them. Although cultivated in ancient Egypt, wild emmer has not been grown for human consumption in recent history, perhaps owing to the difficulty with which the chaff is separated from the seed kernels, formerly requiring the spikes to be pounded with mortar and pestle. Wild emmer is distinguished from common wheat by its tougher ear rachis and the beards releasing the grains easily, by their ear rachis becoming brittle when ripe and their firmly fitting beards. Wild emmer grows to a height of 50–70 cm (20–28 in), and bears an elongated spike measuring 10–15 cm (3.9–5.9 in), with long, protruding awns extending upwards. Avni et al., 2017 provides a complete emmer genome.

=== History of cultivation ===
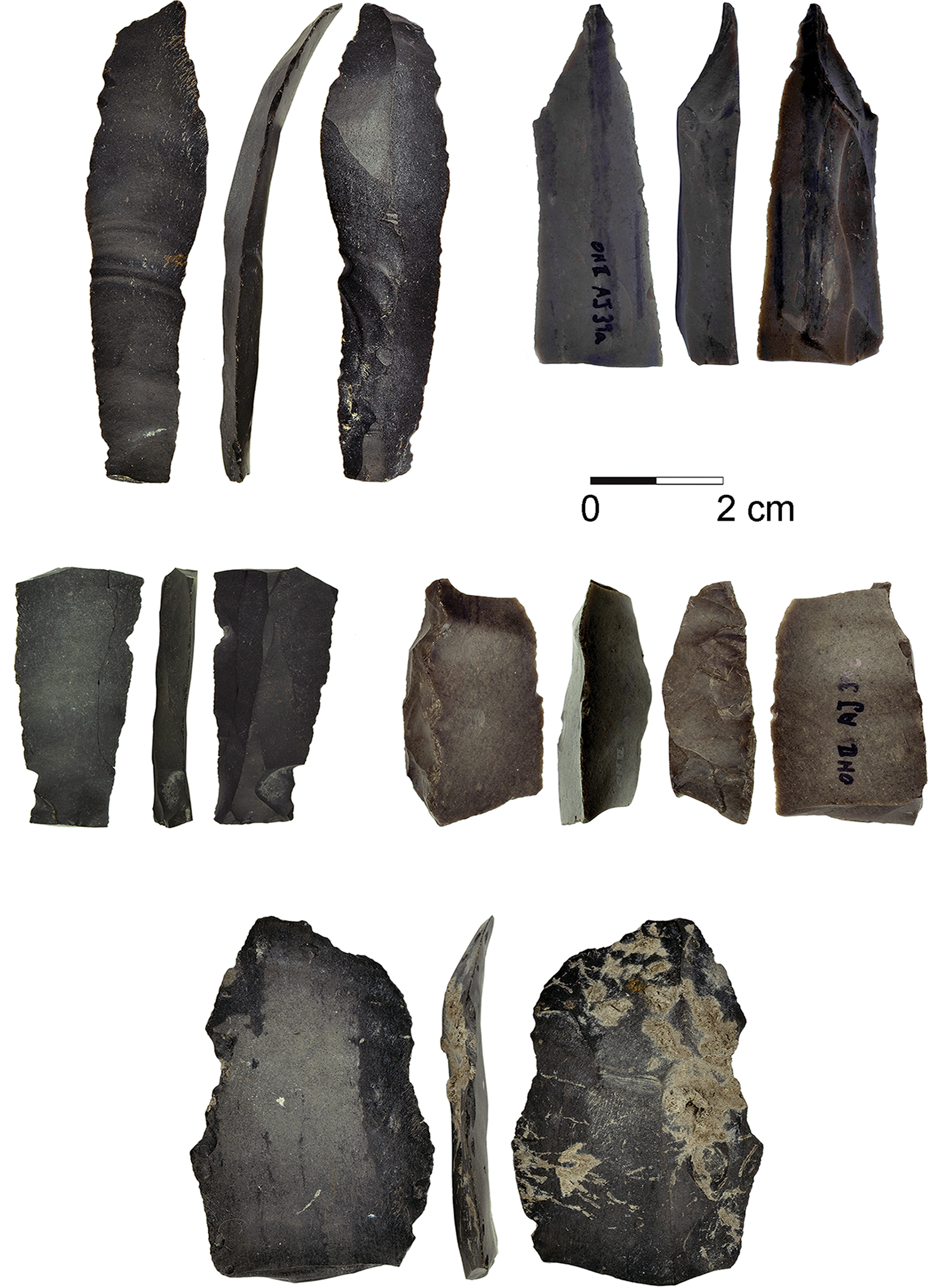
Grains of wild emmer from 17,000 BC, and sickles (shown) used to harvest it, have been found at the Ohalo archaeological site in Israel.

Wild emmer is native to the Fertile Crescent of the Middle East, growing in the grass and woodland of hill country from modern-day Israel to Iran. The origin of wild emmer has been suggested, without universal agreement among scholars, to be the Karaca Dağ mountain region of southeastern Turkey. In 1906, Aaron Aaronsohn's discovery of wild emmer wheat growing in Rosh Pinna (Israel) created a stir in the botanical world. Emmer wheat has been found in archaeological excavations and ancient tombs. Emmer was collected from the wild and eaten by hunter gatherers for thousands of years before its domestication. Grains of wild emmer discovered at Ohalo II had a radiocarbon dating of 17,000 BC and at the Pre-Pottery Neolithic A (PPNA) site of Netiv Hagdud are 10,000–9,400 years old.

The location of the earliest site of emmer domestication is still unclear and under debate. Some of the earliest sites with possible indirect evidence for emmer domestication during the Early Pre-Pottery Neolithic B include Tell Aswad, Çayönü, Cafer Höyük, Aşıklı Höyük, Kissonerga-Mylouthkia and Shillourokambos. Definitive evidence for the full domestication of emmer wheat is not found until the Middle Pre-Pottery Neolithic B (10,200 to 9,500 BP), at sites such as Beidha, Tell Ghoraifé, Tell es-Sultan (Jericho), Abu Hureyra, Tell Halula, Tell Aswad and Cafer Höyük.

Emmer is found in a large number of Neolithic sites scattered around the fertile crescent. From its earliest days of cultivation, emmer was a more prominent crop than its cereal contemporaries and competitors, einkorn wheat and barley. Small quantities of emmer are present during Period 1 at Mehrgharh on the Indian subcontinent, showing that emmer was already cultivated there by 7000–5000 BC.

In the Near East, in southern Mesopotamia in particular, cultivation of emmer wheat began to decline in the Early Bronze Age, from about 3000 BC, and barley became the standard cereal crop. This has been related to increased salinization of irrigated alluvial soils, of which barley is more tolerant, although this study has been challenged. Emmer had a special place in ancient Egypt, where it was the main wheat cultivated in Pharaonic times, although cultivated einkorn wheat was grown in great abundance during the Third Dynasty, and large quantities of it were found preserved, along with cultivated emmer wheat and barleys, in the subterranean chambers beneath the Step Pyramid at Saqqara. Neighbouring countries also cultivated einkorn, durum and common wheat. In the absence of any obvious functional explanation, the greater prevalence of emmer wheat in the diet of ancient Egypt may simply reflect a marked culinary or cultural preference, or may reflect growing conditions having changed after the Third Dynasty. Emmer and barley were the primary ingredients in ancient Egyptian bread and beer. Emmer recovered from the Phoenician settlement at Volubilis (in present-day Morocco) has been dated to the middle of the first millennium BC.

Emmer wheat may be one of the five species of grain which have a special status in Judaism. One of these species may be either emmer or spelt. However, it is fairly certain that spelt did not grow in ancient Israel, and emmer was probably a significant crop until the end of the Iron Age. References to emmer in Greek and Latin texts are traditionally translated as "spelt", even though spelt was not common in the Classical world until very late in its history.

Pliny the Elder notes that although emmer was called far in his time, it had formerly been called adoreum (or 'glory'), providing an etymology explaining that emmer had been held in glory. He mentions its use in sacrifices, stating that it had to be purified by roasting in order to be suitable. He states that in Etruria emmer was first roasted, then crushed either with an iron-capped pestle, or using a handmill that was toothed on the inside. This contrasted, Pliny writes, with the rest of Italy, where either a plain pestle or a watermill was used to make it into flour.

== Cultivation ==
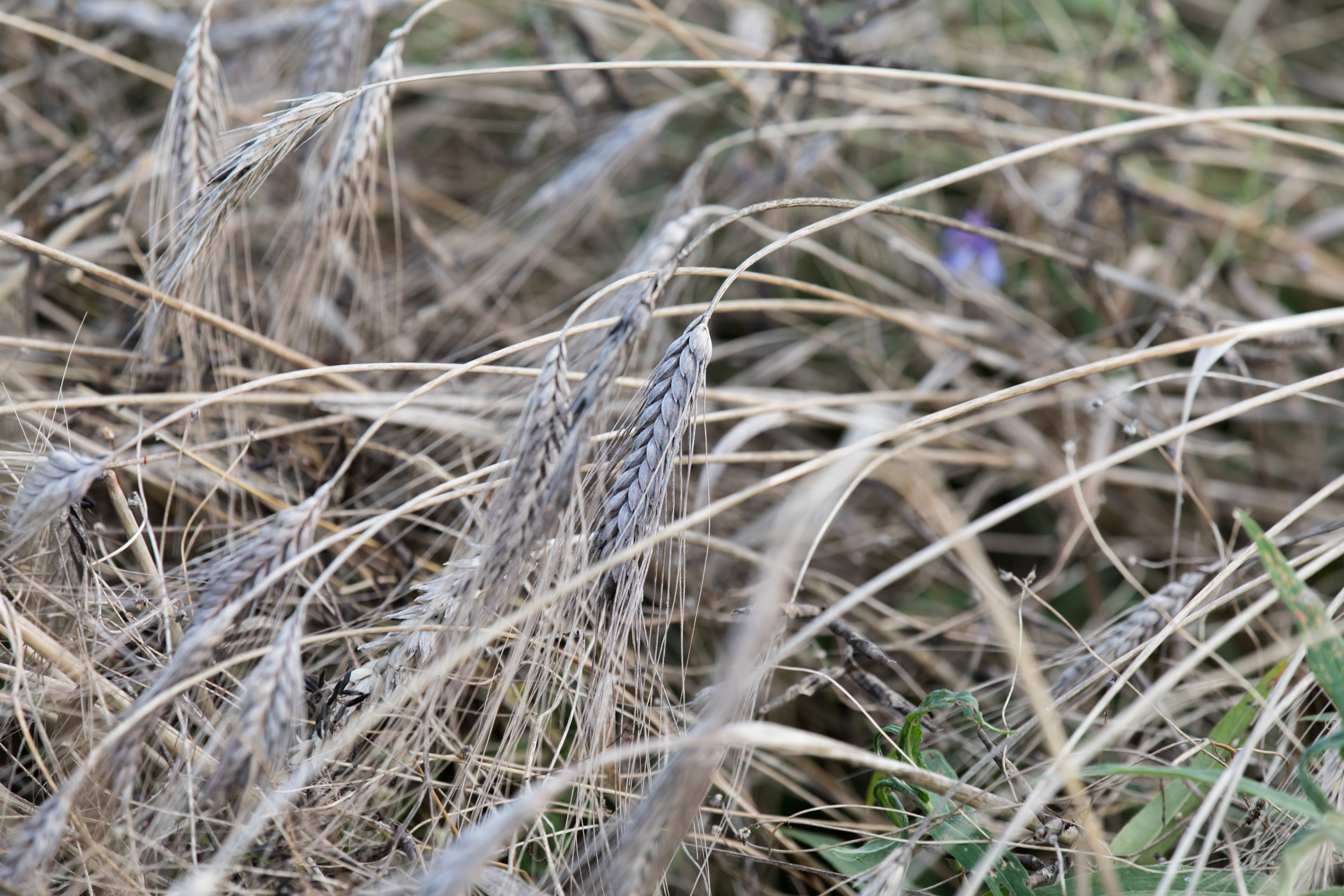
Emmer in North Rhine-Westphalia, Germany, affected by lodging

Today emmer is primarily a relict crop in mountainous areas. Its value lies in its ability to give good yields on poor soils, and its resistance to fungal diseases such as stem rust that are prevalent in wet areas. Emmer is grown in Armenia, Morocco, Spain (Asturias), the Carpathian mountains on the border of Czechia and Slovakia, Albania, Turkey, Switzerland, Germany, Greece and Italy. It is grown in the U.S. as a specialty product. In Ethiopia, the grain is traditional.

In Italy, uniquely, emmer cultivation is well established and even expanding. In the mountainous Garfagnana area of Tuscany emmer (one of three grains known as farro) is grown by farmers as an IGP (Indicazione Geografica Protetta) product, with its geographic identity protected by law. The demand for Italian farro has led to competition from non-certified farro, grown in lowland areas and often consisting of a different wheat species, spelt.

== Uses ==
Emmer's main use is as food, though it is also used as fodder. Ethnographic evidence from Turkey and other emmer-growing areas suggests that emmer makes good bread (judged by the taste and texture standards of traditional bread); it was widely eaten as bread in ancient Egypt. In Armenian cuisine, emmer pilaf is cooked in sunflower oil. The pre-cooked emmer is fried in oil and then sautéed onions are added. In the second version, boiled water and emmer are added to the sautéed onion and then cooked until tender. In Armenia, emmer porridge with lamb called "kashovi" is widespread in the Shirak region, while lean kashovi is known in all regions of Armenia. Chopped lamb is added to cold water then boiled for 10 minutes, emmer and sautéed onion are added and cooked over a low heat until tender. Emmer is the most common variety of farro grown in Italy, specifically in certain mountain regions of Tuscany and Abruzzo, and can be found in most supermarkets and groceries. It is considered to be of higher quality for cooking than the other two grains and thus is sometimes called "true" farro. The whole grains can be cooked in water until soft and used as a side dish, or added into salads, soups and desserts. Emmer bread (pane di farro) can be found in bakeries in some areas.

Emmer has also been used in beer production.

Emmer has antihyperglycemic properties and antioxidant activity, which could be useful as part of a diet for type 2 diabetes in its early stages. As with all varieties and hybrids of wheat, emmer is unsuitable for people with gluten-related disorders, despite the popular claim that ancient grains contain less gluten.

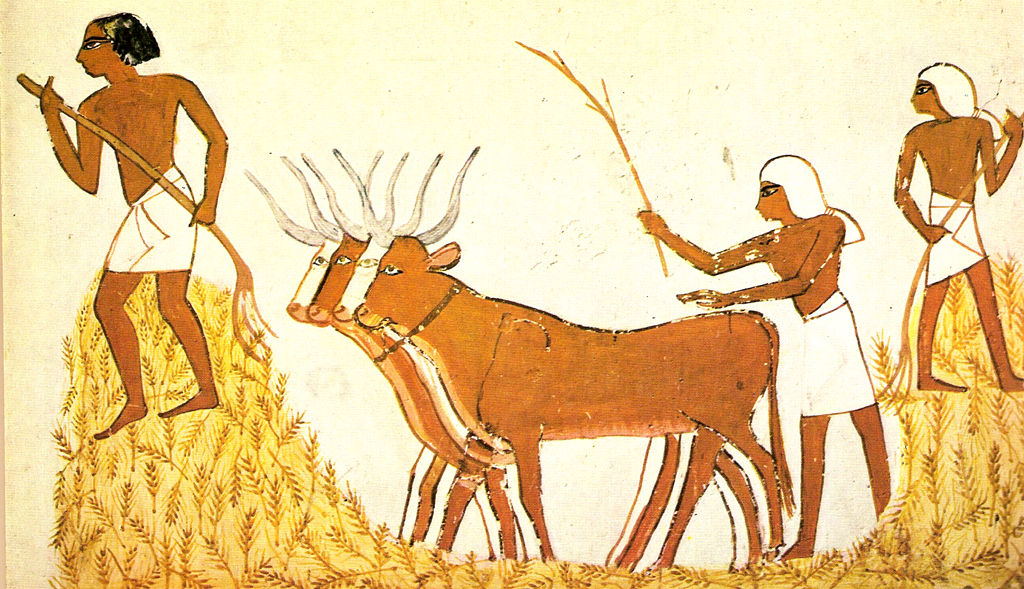
Threshing in ancient Egypt, where emmer was widely used for bread

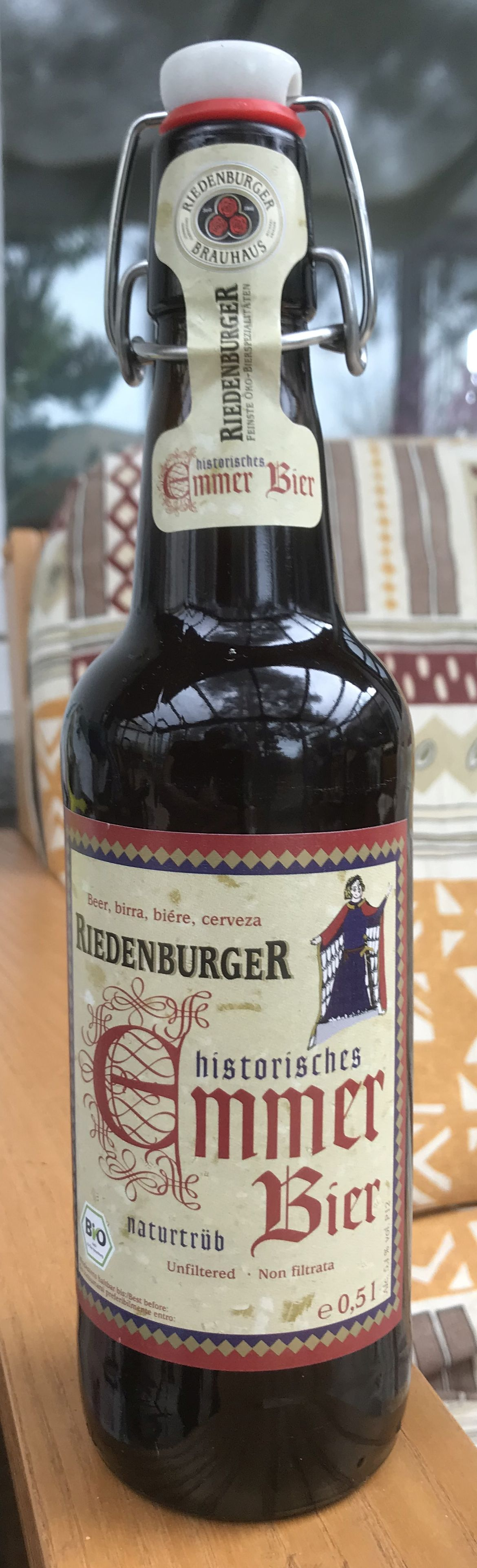
A bottle of
emmer beer, Germany

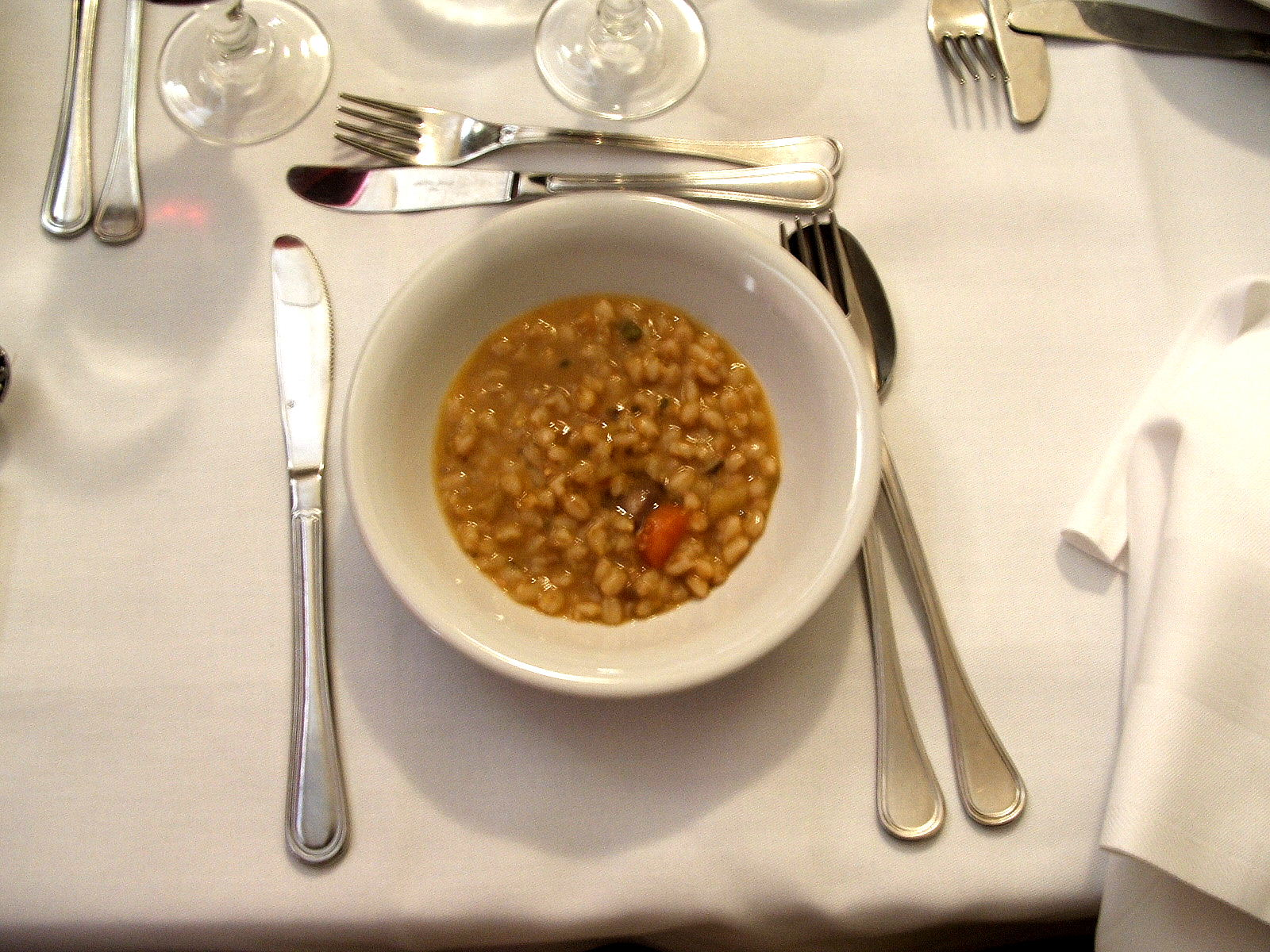
Minestra di farro is a typical dish in Tuscany, Italy

== Sources ==
- Zohary, Daniel; Hopf, Maria (2000). Domestication of plants in the Old World. Oxford: Oxford University Press. ISBN 0-19-850356-3.
- Jacobsen, Thorkild; Adams, Robert M. (1958). "Salt and Silt in Ancient Mesopotamian Agriculture". Science. 128 (3334). American Association for the Advancement of Science: 1251–8. Bibcode:1958Sci...128.1251J. doi:10.1126/science.128.3334.1251. PMID 17793690.
