= Dmitry Sosnovsky =

Soviet botanist (1886–1952)

Dmitry Ivanovich Sosnovsky
- Born: 1 July [O.S. 19 June] 1886; Alexandropol, Erivan Governorate, Russian Empire (now Gyumri, Armenia)
- Died: 20 April 1953 (aged 66)
- Scientific career
- Fields: Botany
- Workplaces: Odessa University
- Author abbrev. (botany): Sosn.

Dmitry Ivanovich Sosnovsky (Russian: Дми́трий Ива́нович Сосно́вский) was a Soviet botanist.

The standard author abbreviation Sosn. is used to indicate this person as the author when citing a botanical name.
