= Triticum urartu =

Conservation status
- Data Deficient (IUCN 3.1)

Scientific classification
- Kingdom: Plantae
- Clade: Tracheophytes
- Clade: Angiosperms
- Clade: Monocots
- Clade: Commelinids
- Order: Poales
- Family: Poaceae
- Subfamily: Pooideae
- Genus: Triticum
- Species: T. urartu

Binomial name
- Triticum urartu Thumanjan ex Gandilyan

Synonyms
- Crithodium urartu (Gandilyan) Á.Löve; Triticum michaelii Zhuk. nom. inval.

Species of grass

Triticum urartu, also known as red wild einkorn wheat, and a form of einkorn wheat, is a grass species related to wheat, and native to western Asia. It is a diploid species whose genome is the A genome of the allopolyploid hexaploid bread wheat Triticum aestivum, which has genomes AABBDD.
