= Gustav Schübler =

- Born: August 15, 1787; Heilbronn, Duchy of Württemberg, Holy Roman Empire
- Died: September 8, 1834 (aged 47); Tübingen, Kingdom of Württemberg
- Other names: Gustav Schuebler
- Occupation(s): Naturalist, Botanist, Meteorologist

Gustav Schübler (15 August 1787 – 8 September 1834) was a German naturalist, and the founder of applied meteorology in Germany.

In 1817 Schübler became professor of botany, natural history and agricultural chemistry at the University of Tübingen, Germany. He worked in identifying and classifying new species, many with his colleague Georg Matthias von Martens (1788–1872).

== Selected works ==
- Grundsätze der Meteorologie in näherer Beziehung auf Deutschland's Klima, 1831 – Principles of meteorology as it applies to Germany's climate.
- Untersuchungen über die Vertheilung der Farben und Geruchsverhältnisse in der Familie der Rubiaceen, 1831 – Studies on the distribution of color and odor conditions in the family Rubiaceae.
- Untersuchungen über die Farbenveränderungen der Blüthen, 1833 – Studies on the changes of color in flowers.
- Flora von Württemberg, 1834 (with Georg Matthias von Martens) – Flora of Württemberg.
