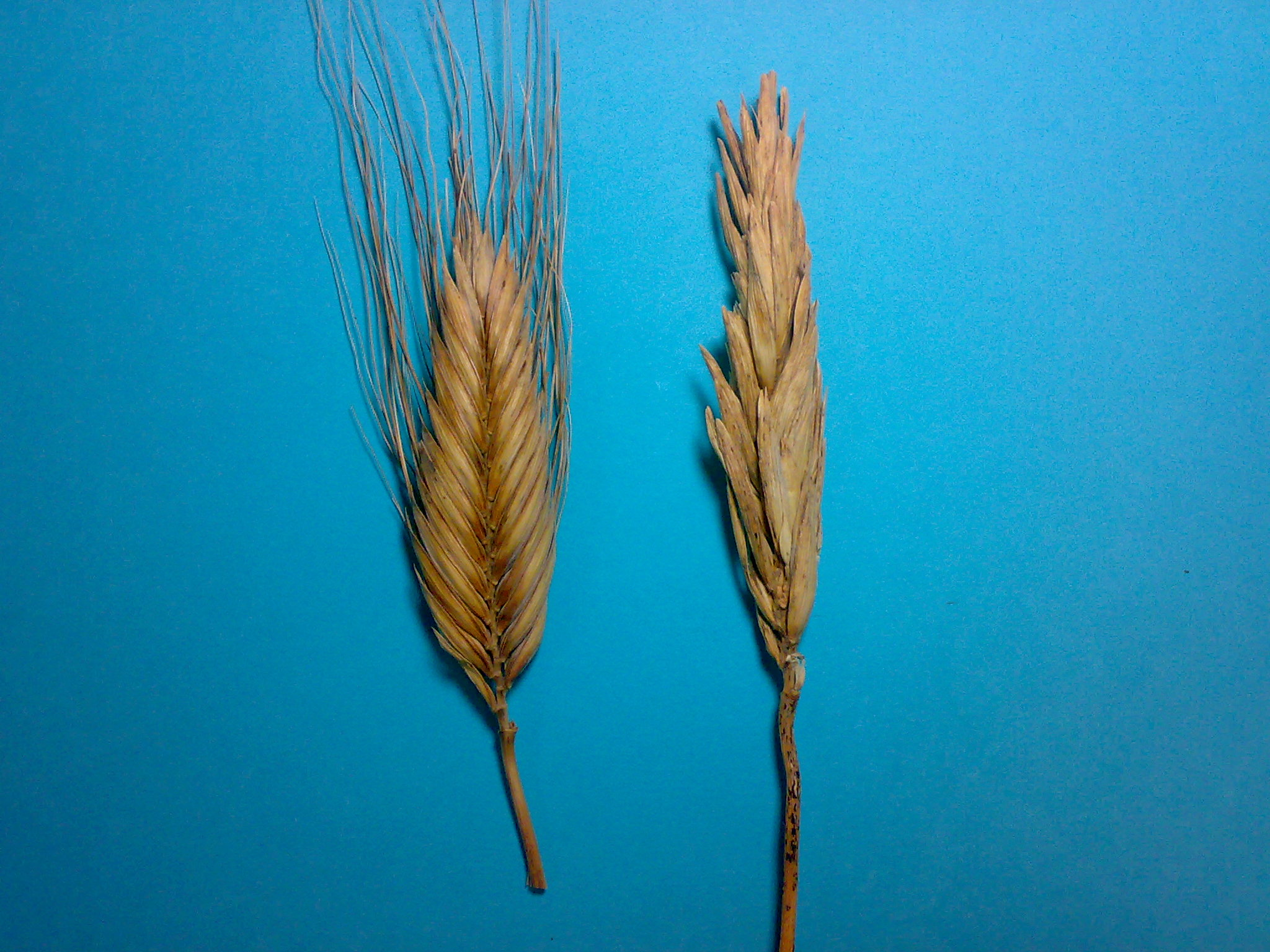

Scientific classification
- Kingdom: Plantae
- Clade: Tracheophytes
- Clade: Angiosperms
- Clade: Monocots
- Clade: Commelinids
- Order: Poales
- Family: Poaceae
- Subfamily: Pooideae
- Genus: Triticum
- Species: T. polonicum

Binomial name
- Triticum polonicum L.

Synonyms
- Triticum turgidum subsp. polonicum

= Triticum polonicum =

Species of grass

Triticum polonicum, also known as the Polish wheat, is a spring wheat variety of wheat. It is an allotetraploid (AABB) species with 28 chromosomes. It can be found in small areas of the Mediterranean region, Ethiopia, Russia and in other regions of Asia. It was first described by Carl Linnaeus in 1762. T. polonicum is characterised by longer glumes and grains.

== Genetics ==
Breeding studies revealed in 1905 - and more even definitively in 1920 - that this species' glume length is controlled by a single locus. Since then it has been named P1, determined to be semi-dominant, localised to the short arm of chromosome 7A, and has been shown to be pleitropic for glume and grain and flower spike length, and for fewer spikelets per spike. Longer glumes and grains have been localised to the same chromosome of T. petropavlovskyi and the Portuguese landrace group "Arrancada", suggesting their ancestry includes a contribution from T. polonicum.
