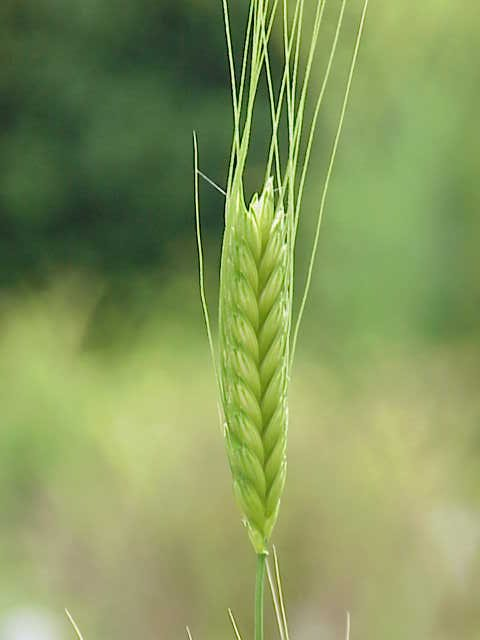

Scientific classification
- Kingdom: Plantae
- Clade: Tracheophytes
- Clade: Angiosperms
- Clade: Monocots
- Clade: Commelinids
- Order: Poales
- Family: Poaceae
- Subfamily: Pooideae
- Genus: Triticum
- Species: T. monococcum

Binomial name
- Triticum monococcum L.

Synonyms
- Triticum monococcum subsp. monococcum

= Einkorn =

Primitive wheat

Wild einkorn
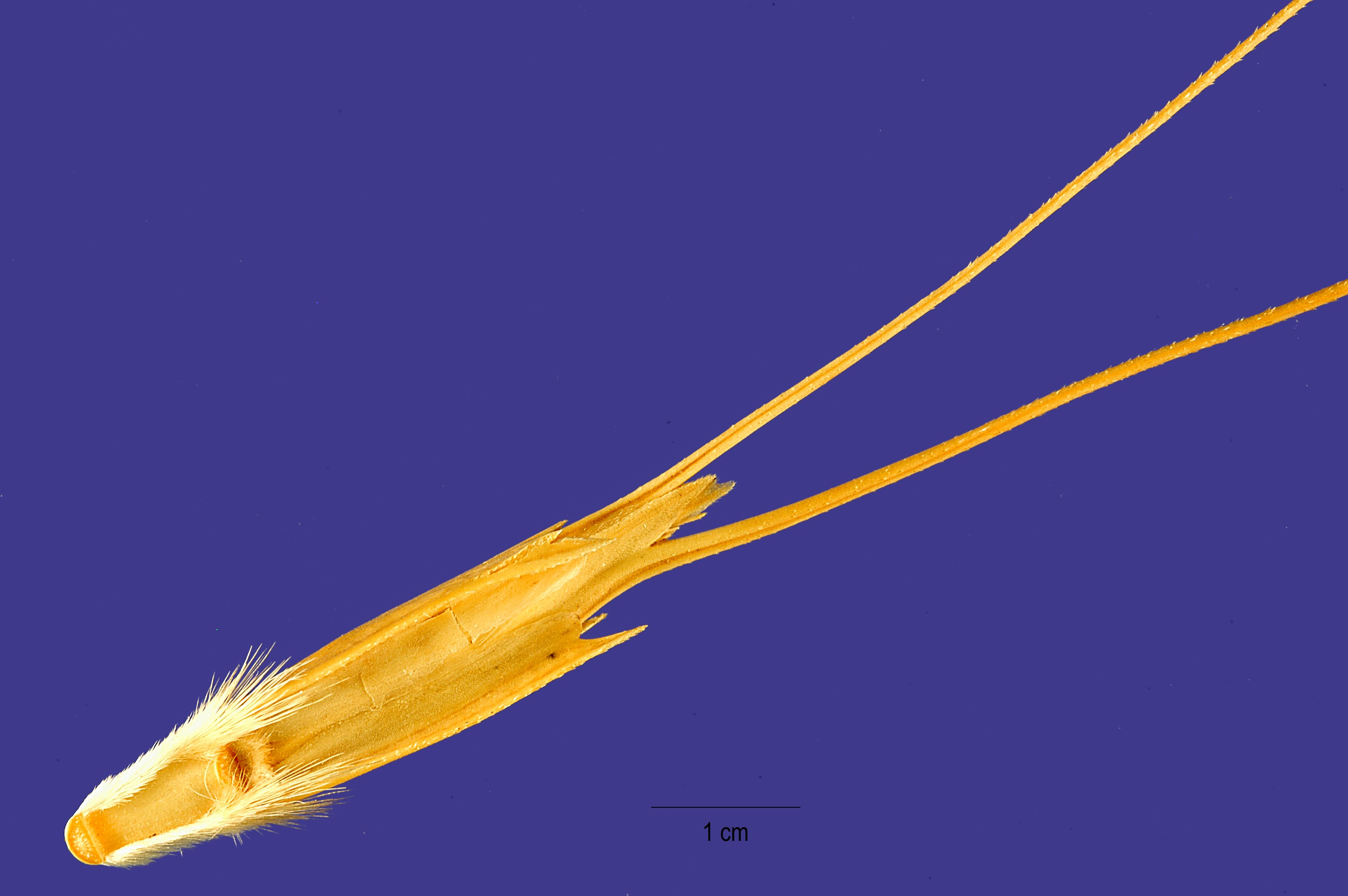

Scientific classification
- Kingdom: Plantae
- Clade: Tracheophytes
- Clade: Angiosperms
- Clade: Monocots
- Clade: Commelinids
- Order: Poales
- Family: Poaceae
- Subfamily: Pooideae
- Genus: Triticum
- Species: T. boeoticum

Binomial name
- Triticum boeoticum

Synonyms
- Triticum monococcum ssp. boeoticum

Einkorn (from German Einkorn, literally "single grain") can refer to either a wild species of wheat (Triticum) or a domesticated form of wheat. The wild form is T. boeoticum (syn. T. m. subsp. boeoticum), and the domesticated form is T. monococcum (syn. T. m. subsp. monococcum). Einkorn is a diploid species (2n = 14 chromosomes) of hulled wheat, with tough glumes (husks) that tightly enclose the grains. The cultivated form is similar to the wild, except that the ear stays intact when ripe and the seeds are larger. The domestic form is known as petit épeautre in French, Einkorn in German, "einkorn" or "littlespelt" in English, piccolo farro in Italian and escanda menor in Spanish. The name refers to the fact that each spikelet contains only one grain. Einkorn was one of the first forms of wheat to be cultivated.

== Description ==
Einkorn is a short variety of wild wheat, usually less than 70 centimetres (28 in) tall, and is not very productive of edible seeds. The principal difference between wild einkorn and cultivated einkorn is the method of seed dispersal. In the wild variety, the seed head usually shatters and drops the kernels (seeds) of wheat onto the ground. This facilitates a new crop of wheat. In the domestic variety, the seed head remains intact. While such a mutation may occasionally occur in the wild, it is not viable there in the long term: the intact seed head will only drop to the ground when the stalk rots, and the kernels will not scatter but form a tight clump which inhibits germination and makes the mutant seedlings susceptible to disease. Harvesting einkorn with intact seed heads was easier for early human harvesters, who could then manually break apart the seed heads and scatter any kernels not eaten. Over time and through selection, conscious or unconscious, the human preference for intact seed heads created the domestic variety, which has slightly larger kernels than wild einkorn. Domesticated einkorn thus requires human planting and harvesting for its continuing existence. This process of domestication may have taken only 20 to 200 years, resulting in a wheat that was easier to harvest.

An important characteristic facilitating the domestication of einkorn and other annual grains is that the plants are largely self-pollinating. Thus, the desirable (for human management) traits of einkorn could be perpetuated at less risk of cross-fertilization with wild plants which might have traits – e.g. smaller seeds, shattering seed heads, as less desirable for human management.

== Taxonomy ==
Cultivated Einkorn was described as a taxon, Triticum monococcum, by Carl Linnaeus in 1753. Later descriptions by other taxonomists, now treated as synonyms, include Triticum pubescens by von Bieberstein in 1800; Triticum hornemanii by Clementi in 1818; Nivieria monococcum in 1841; Triticum vulgare monococcum by Alefeld in 1866; Triticum monococcum subsp. cereale by Albert Thellung in 1918. Wild Einkorn is known either as Triticum monococcum subsp. aegilopoides or as Triticum boeoticum.

Einkorn is related to emmer and bread wheat but is not a hybrid.

Wild and domesticated einkorns are diploid wheats. Unlike emmer and bread wheat, which were formed by hybridisation with Aegilops goatgrasses, einkorn is not a hybrid.

== Ecology and distribution ==
Einkorn wheat commonly grows wild in the hill country in the northern part of the Fertile Crescent and Anatolia, although it has a wider distribution reaching into the Balkans and south to Jordan near the Dead Sea.

== History ==
=== Early human use ===
Einkorn wheat is one of the earliest cultivated forms of wheat, alongside emmer wheat (T. dicoccum). Hunter gatherers in the Fertile Crescent may have started harvesting einkorn as early as 30,000 years ago, according to archaeological evidence from Syria.

=== Domestication ===
Although gathered from the wild for thousands of years, einkorn wheat was first domesticated approximately 10,000 years BP in the Pre-Pottery Neolithic A (PPNA) or B (PPNB) periods. Evidence from DNA fingerprinting suggests einkorn was first domesticated near Karaca Dağ in southeast Turkey, an area in which a number of PPNB farming villages have been found. Yuval Noah Harari suggests that the domestication of einkorn was linked to intensive agriculture to support the nearby Göbekli Tepe site.

=== Spread of cultivation ===
From the northern part of the Fertile Crescent, the cultivation of einkorn wheat spread to the Caucasus, the Balkans, and central Europe. Einkorn wheat was more commonly grown in cooler climates than emmer wheat, the other domesticated wheat. Cultivation of einkorn in the Middle East began to decline in favor of emmer wheat around 2000 BCE. Cultivation of einkorn was never extensive in Italy, southern France, and Spain. Einkorn continued to be cultivated in some areas of northern Europe throughout the Middle Ages and until the early part of the 20th century.

== Agronomy ==
Einkorn wheat is low-yielding, but can survive on poor, dry, marginal soils where other varieties of wheat will not. As with other ancient varieties of wheat such as emmer, Einkorn is a "covered wheat", as its kernels do not break free from its seed coat (glume) with threshing. This makes it difficult to separate the husk from the seed.

== Uses ==
Einkorn is a common food in northern Provence, France. It is used for bulgur or as animal feed in mountainous areas of countries including France, India, Italy, Morocco, the former Yugoslavia, and Turkey. It contains gluten (so is not suitable for people with gluten-related disorders) and has a higher percentage of protein than modern red wheats. It is considered more nutritious because it has higher levels of fat, phosphorus, potassium, pyridoxine, and beta-carotene.

=== Use in baking ===
Historically, einkorn was not used in breadmaking, having primarily been eaten boiled in whole grains or in porridge, meaning that cultivars were not selected for their breadmaking potential. Until recently, einkorn was not thought to be suitable for baking, as its dough is sticky, inelastic and difficult to handle. Testing during the 1990s demonstrated that some einkorn varieties could perform favourably in comparison to bread wheats, and, while only some genotypes proved suitable for breadmaking, a wide variety were suitable for use in other baked goods. Einkorn dough has a bright yellow colour due to high levels of carotenoids, and due to low gas retention yields loaves with a dense structure. Einkorn doughs should be kneaded for a shorter time, and require approximately 10-15 minutes longer baking time than comparable bread wheat doughs.

=== Resource for plant breeding ===
Einkorn is the source of many potential introgressions for immunity; Russian geneticist Nikolai Vavilov called it an "accumulator of complex immunities". T. monococcum is the source of Sr21, a stem rust resistance gene which has been introgressed into hexaploid worldwide. It is also the source of Yr34, a resistance gene for yellow rust.

The salt-tolerance feature of T. monococcum has been bred into durum wheat.

== Gallery ==
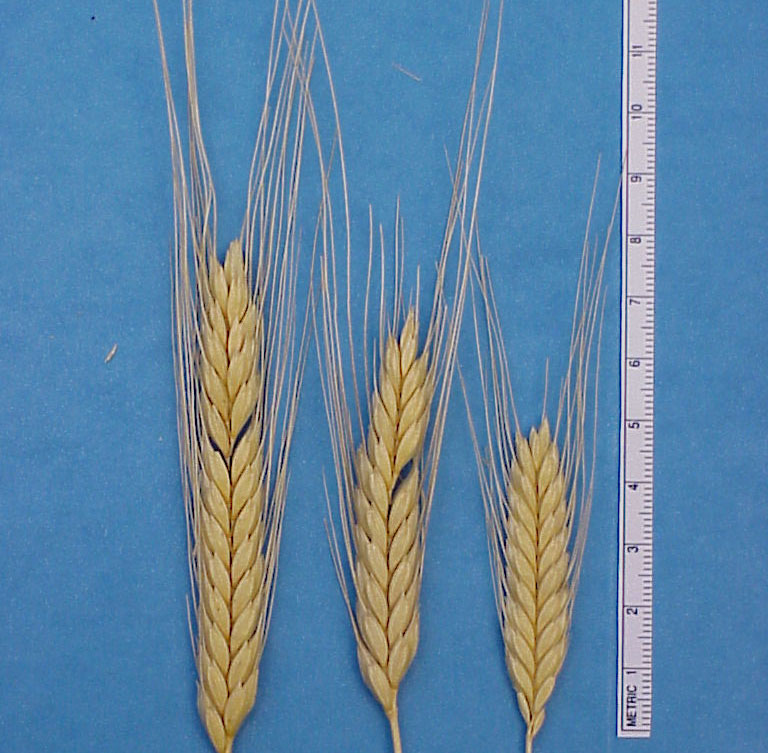
From Thuringia, Germany

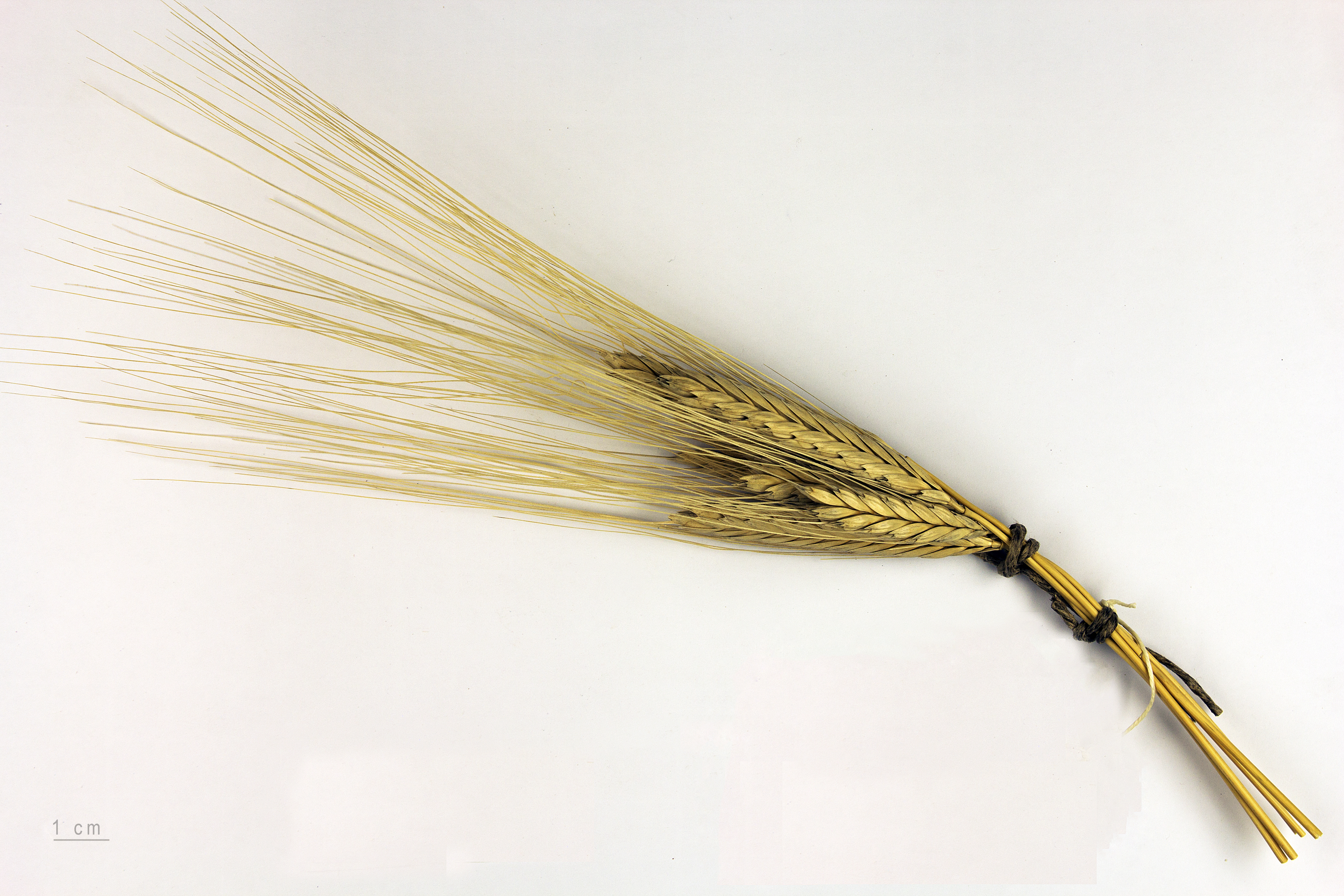
Herbarium specimen, Museum of Toulouse

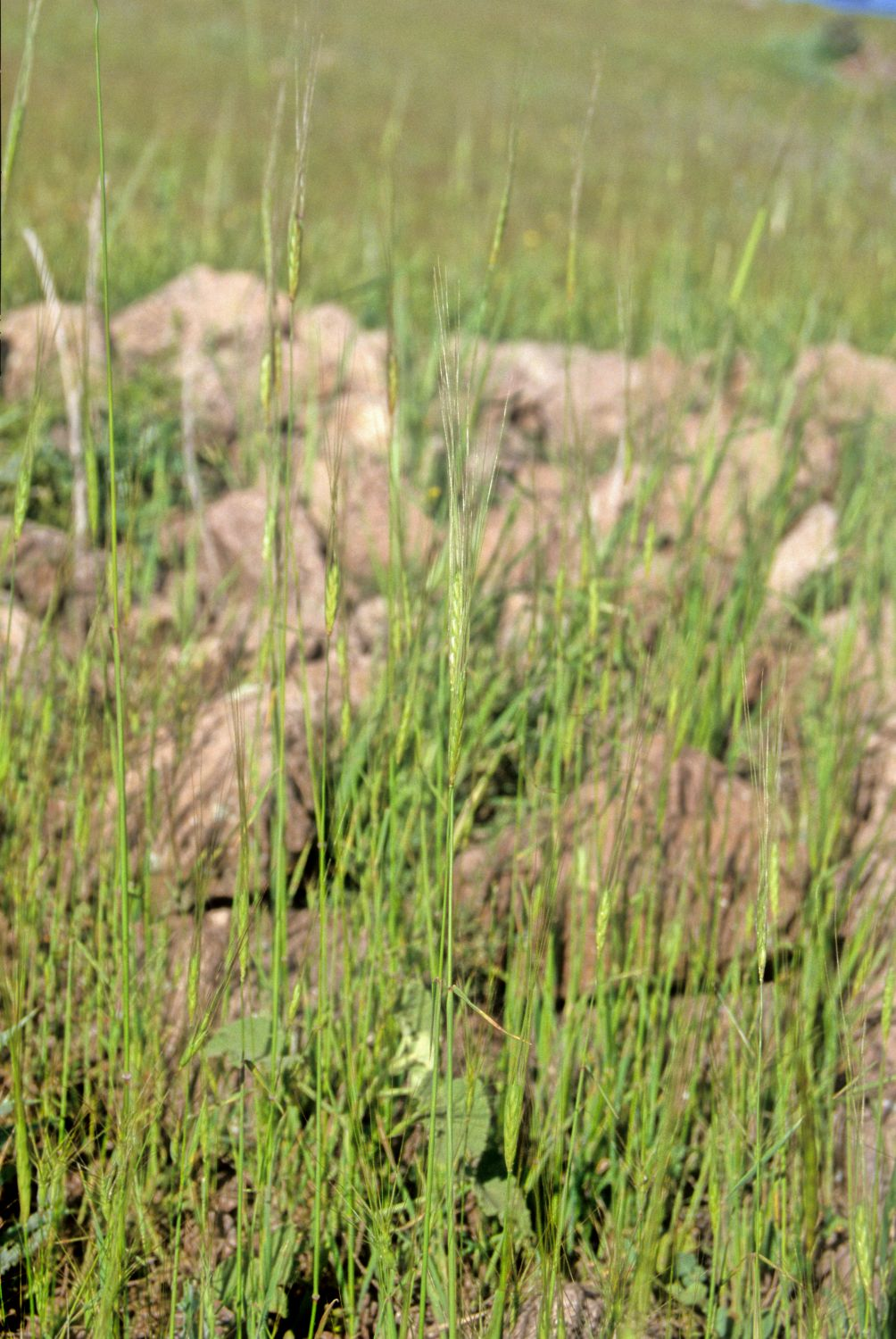
Wild einkorn, Mount Karadağ

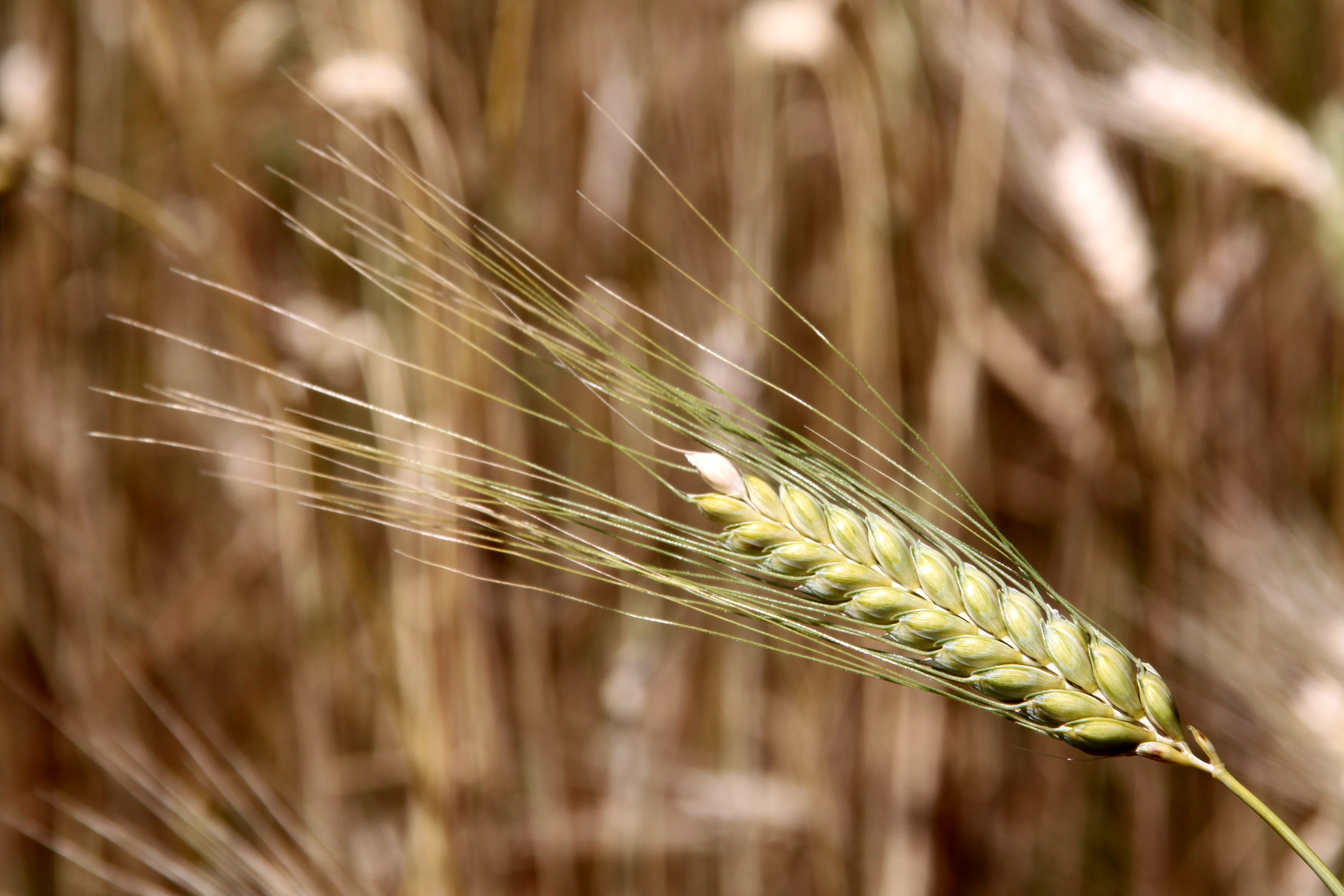
Ripe ear at Bajuwarenhof Kirchheim open-air archaeological museum

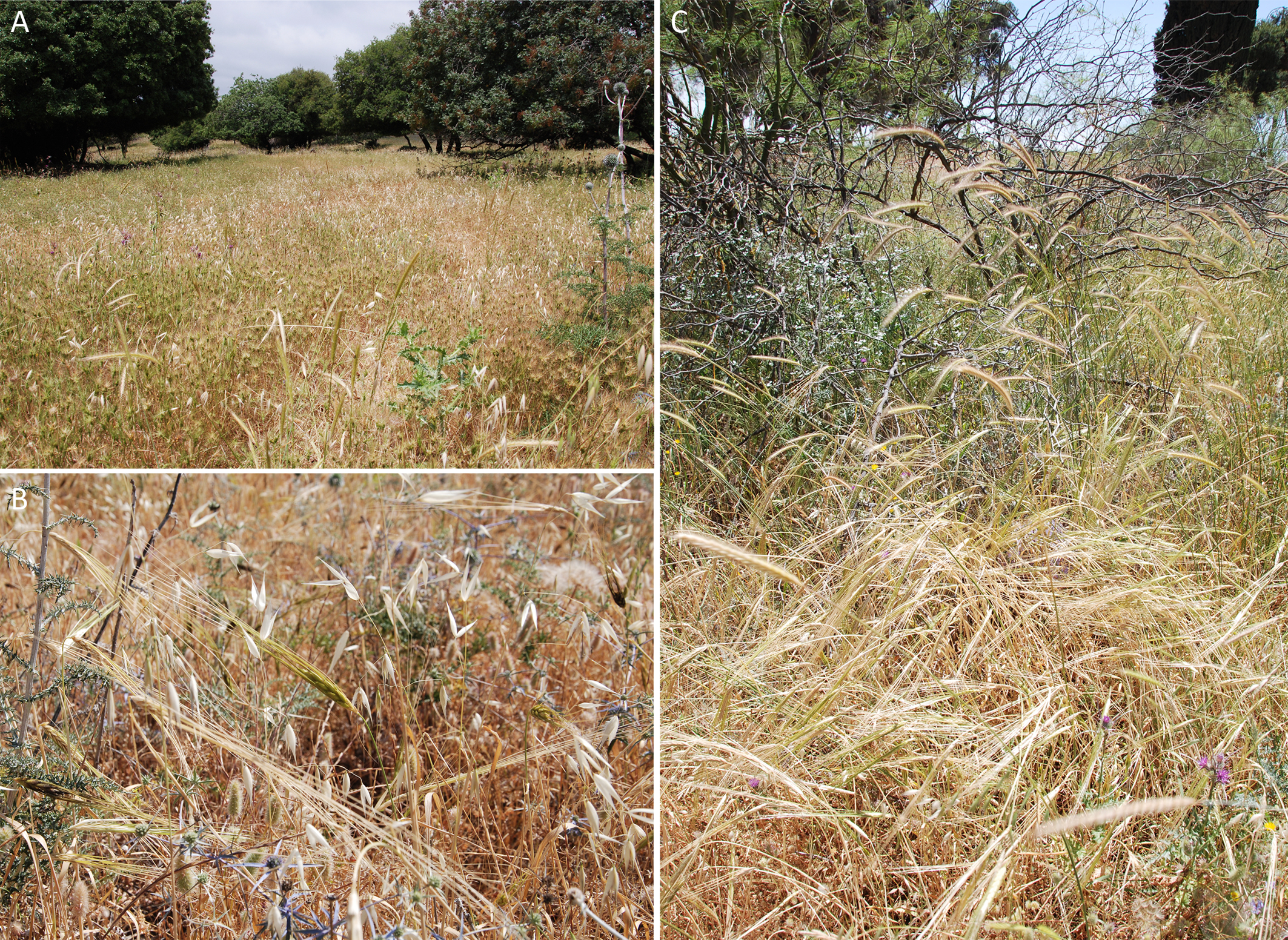
Associations of wild cereals and other wild grasses in northern Israel

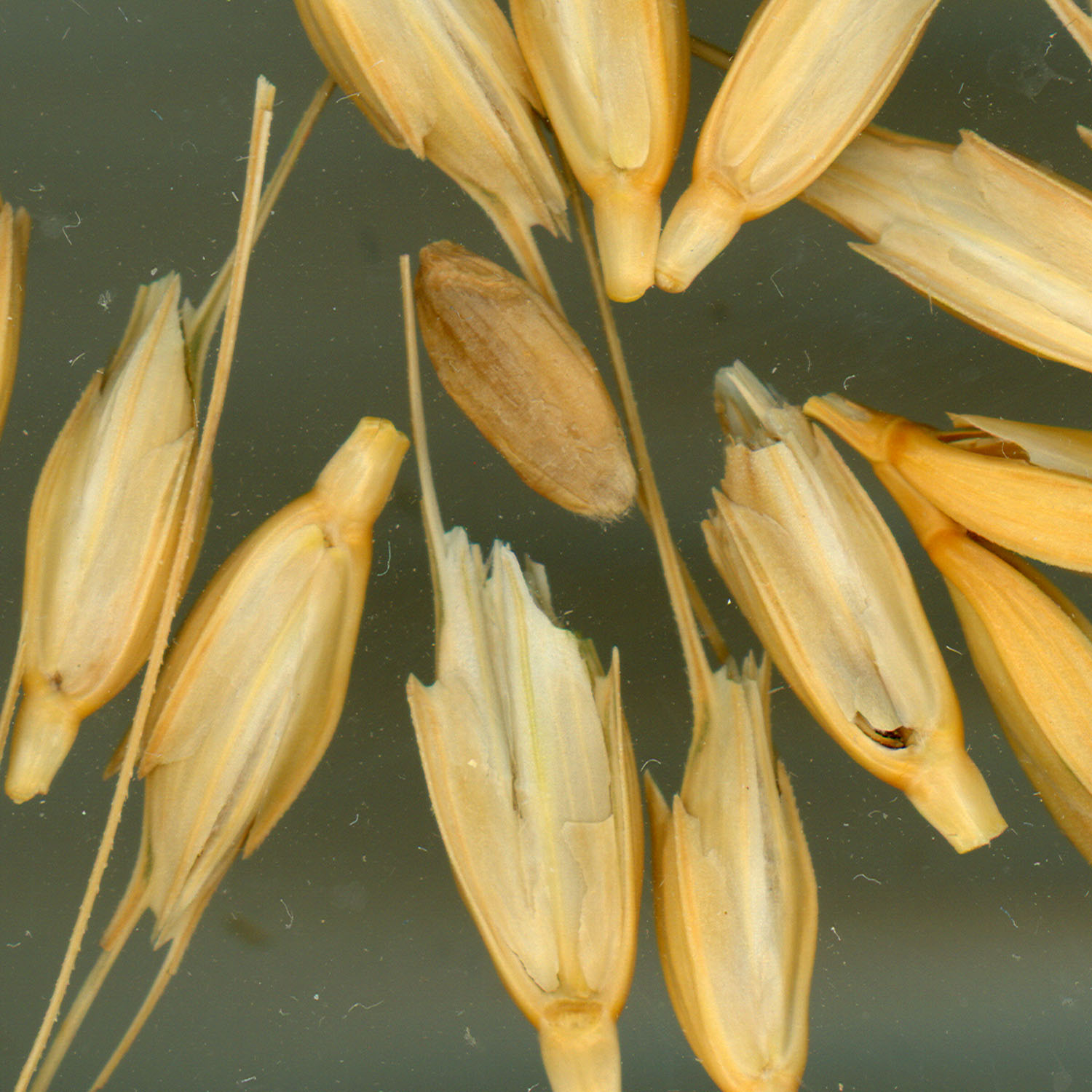
The seeds remain inside the threshed spikelets

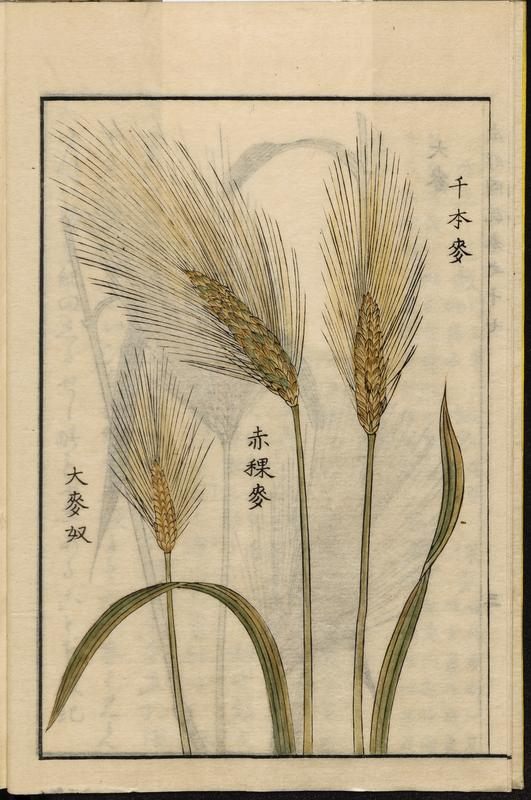
T. monococcum, Japanese agricultural encyclopedia Seikei Zusetsu (1804)
