= Albert Thellung =

Swiss botanist (1881–1928)

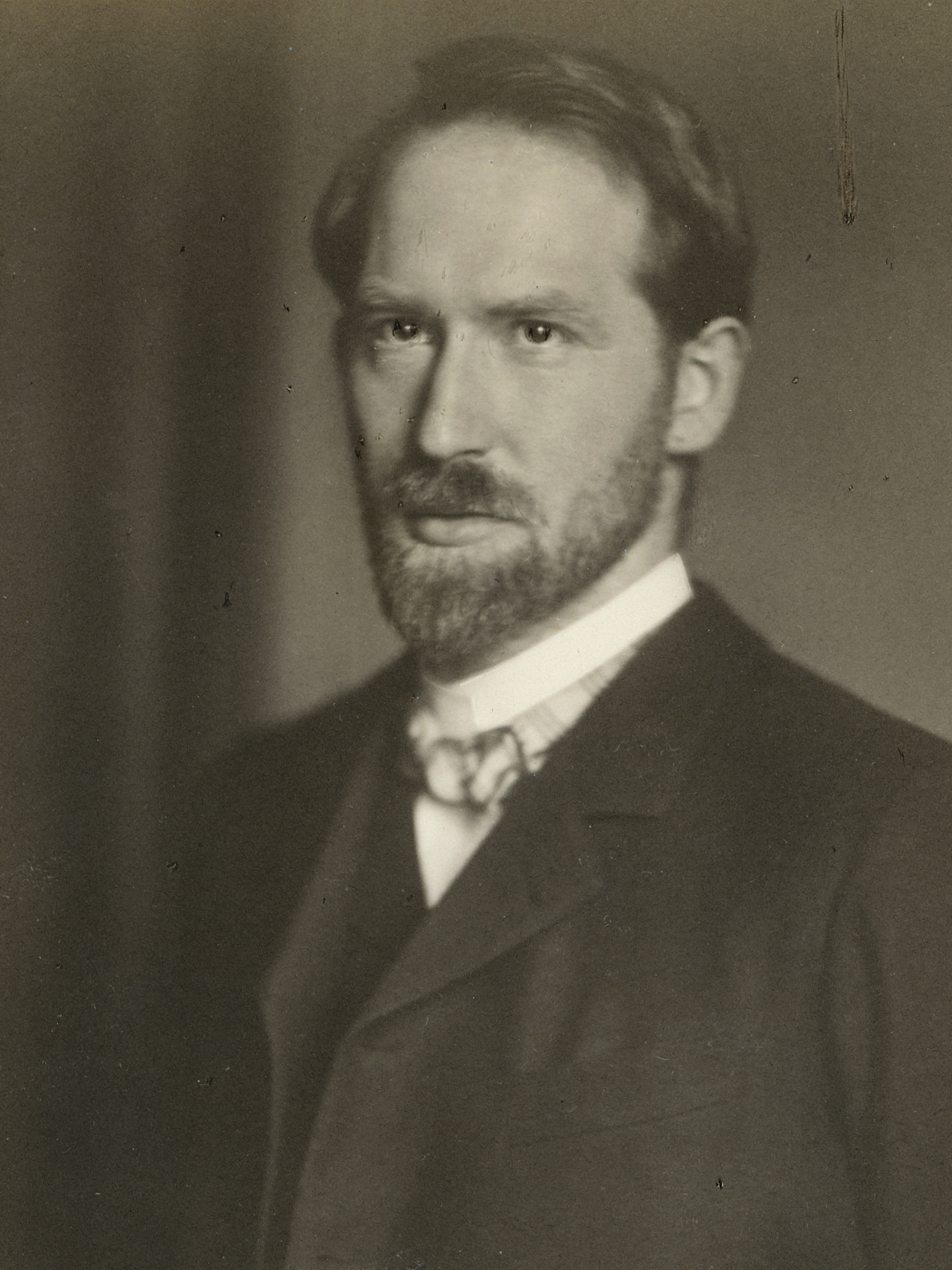
- Albert Thellung in 1914.
- Born: 12 May 1881; Enge, Switzerland
- Died: 26 June 1928; Zürich, Switzerland
- Scientific career
- Fields: Botany
- Author abbrev. (botany): Thell.

Albert Thellung (12 May 1881 – 26 June 1928) was a Swiss botanist.

He was a professor at the University of Zürich. The Austrian botanist Otto Stapf named the plant genus Thellungia of the grass family, Poaceae, after him, and Otto Eugen Schulz named the genus Thellungiella (family Brassicaceae) in his honour.

Thellung made contributions to the third (1909–14) and fourth (1923) editions of Schinz and Keller's Flora der Schweiz.

== Works ==
- Illustrierte Flora von Mittel-Europa 1906
- Die Gattung Lepidium (L.) R. Br. : eine monographische Studie 1906
- La flore adventice de Montpellier 1912
- Flora der Schweiz - Kritische Flora, 1914
- Flora der Schweiz - Exkursionsflora, 1923
- Die Entstehung der Kulturpflanzen 1930
