= Triticum muticum =

Triticum muticum can refer to:

- Triticum muticum (Boiss.) Hack., a synonym of Aegilops mutica Boiss.
- Triticum muticum Schübl., a synonym of Triticum aestivum L. subsp. aestivum, common wheat
