= Aegilops kotschyi =

Conservation status
- Least Concern (IUCN 3.1)

Scientific classification
- Kingdom: Plantae
- Clade: Embryophytes
- Clade: Tracheophytes
- Clade: Angiosperms
- Clade: Monocots
- Clade: Commelinids
- Order: Poales
- Family: Poaceae
- Subfamily: Pooideae
- Genus: Aegilops
- Species: A. kotschyi

Binomial name
- Aegilops kotschyi Boiss.

Synonyms
- Aegilemma kotschyi (Boiss.) Á.Löve; Aegilops geniculata Fig. & De Not. Aegilops glabriglumis Gand. Triticum kotschyi (Boiss.) Bowden

Species of plant in the family Poaceae

Aegilops kotschyi (syn. Aegilops triuncialis var. kotschyi L. (Boiss.) Boiss., Aegilops triuncialis subsp. kotschyi (Boiss.) Zhuk., Aegilops geniculata Fig. & De Not. nom, Aegilops variabilis Eig, Triticum kotschyi (Boiss.) Bowden, Triticum triunciale subsp. kotschyi (L.) Raspail (Boiss.) Asch. & Graebn.) is a member of the grass family, Poaceae, native to the Levant.

Elsewhere it can be a weed. This plant is known or likely to be susceptible to barley mild mosaic bymovirus.
