= Streptomyces triticiradicis =

Scientific classification
- Domain: Bacteria
- Kingdom: Bacillati
- Phylum: Actinomycetota
- Class: Actinomycetia
- Order: Streptomycetales
- Family: Streptomycetaceae
- Genus: Streptomyces
- Species: S. triticiradicis

Binomial name
- Streptomyces triticiradicis Yu et al. 2020

Type strain
- NEAU-H2

Species of bacterium

Streptomyces triticiradicis is a bacterium species from the genus of Streptomyces which has been isolated from rhizosphereic soil from wheat (Triticum aestivum L.). Streptomyces triticiradicis has antifungal properties.

== See also ==
- List of Streptomyces species
