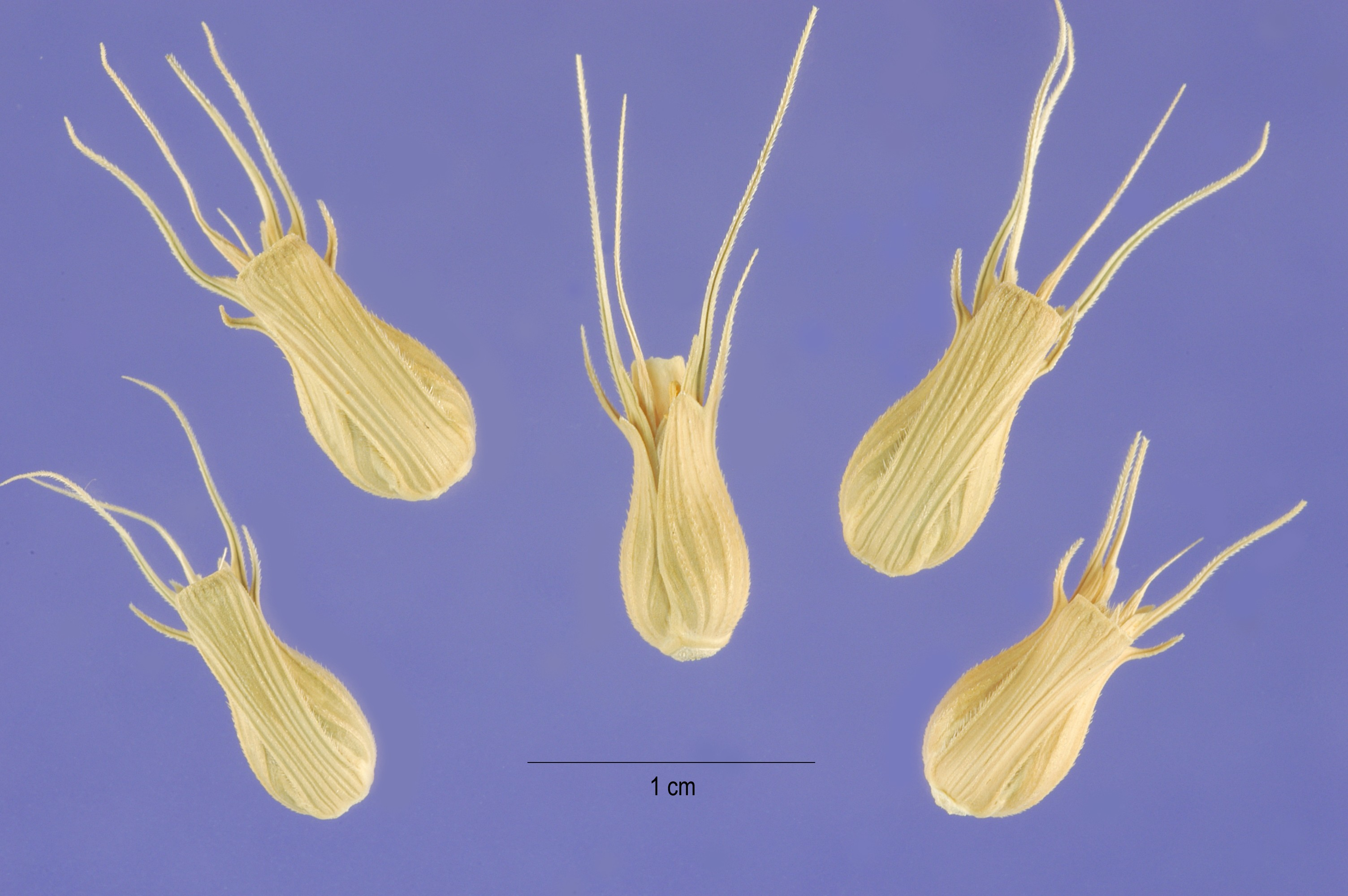

Conservation status
- Least Concern (IUCN 3.1)

Scientific classification
- Kingdom: Plantae
- Clade: Tracheophytes
- Clade: Angiosperms
- Clade: Monocots
- Clade: Commelinids
- Order: Poales
- Family: Poaceae
- Subfamily: Pooideae
- Genus: Aegilops
- Species: A. ventricosa

Binomial name
- Aegilops ventricosa Tausch

= Aegilops ventricosa =

Species of grass

Aegilops ventricosa (syn. Gastropyrum ventricosum (Tausch) Á.Löve, Triticum ventricosum (Tausch) Ces.) is a plant species in the family Poaceae.
