= Triticum caudatum =

Triticum caudatum can refer to:

- Triticum caudatum (L.) Godr. & Gren., a synonym of Aegilops caudata L.
- Triticum caudatum Pers., a synonym of Dasypyrum villosum (L.) Borbás
