= Streptomyces triticisoli =

Streptomyces atriticisoli

Scientific classification
- Domain: Bacteria
- Kingdom: Bacillati
- Phylum: Actinomycetota
- Class: Actinomycetia
- Order: Streptomycetales
- Family: Streptomycetaceae
- Genus: Streptomyces
- Species: S. triticisoli

Binomial name
- Streptomyces triticisoli Tian et al. 2018

Type strain
- NEAU-DSCPA1-4-4

Species of bacterium

Streptomyces triticisoli is a bacterium species from the genus of Streptomyces which has been isolated from rhizosphereic soil of the plant Triticum aestivum.

== See also ==
- List of Streptomyces species
