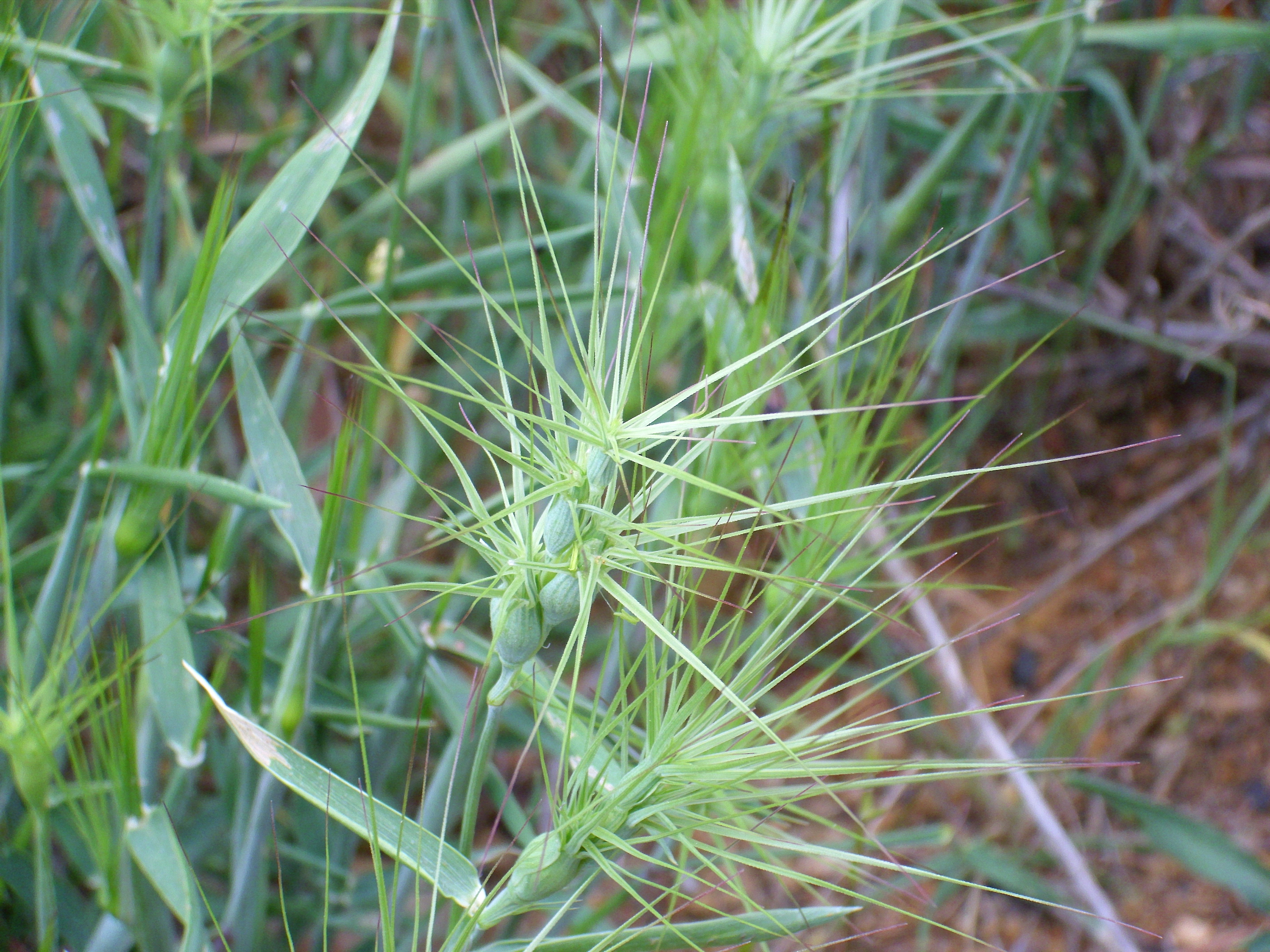
- Aegilops geniculata

Scientific classification
- Kingdom: Plantae
- Clade: Embryophytes
- Clade: Tracheophytes
- Clade: Spermatophytes
- Clade: Angiosperms
- Clade: Monocots
- Clade: Commelinids
- Order: Poales
- Family: Poaceae
- Subfamily: Pooideae
- Supertribe: Triticodae
- Tribe: Triticeae
- Genus: Aegilops; L.

Type species
- Aegilops triuncialis L.

Synonyms
- Triticum sect. Aegilops (L.) Godr. & Gren.; Triticum subg. Aegilops (L.) C. Yen & J.L. Yang; Triticum subg. Aegilops (L.) Schmalh.; Amblyopyrum Eig; Aegilemma Á.Löve; Aegilonearum Á.Löve; Aegilopodes Á.Löve; Chennapyrum Á.Löve; Comopyrum (Jaub. & Spach) Á.Löve; Cylindropyrum (Jaub. & Spach) Á.Löve; Gastropyrum (Jaub. & Spach) Á.Löve; Kiharapyrum Á.Löve; Orrhopygium Á.Löve; Patropyrum Á.Löve; Perlaria Heist. ex Fabr.; Sitopsis (Jaub. & Spach) Á.Löve

= Aegilops =

Goatgrasses

Genus of grasses

Aegilops is a genus of Eurasian and North American plants in the grass family, Poaceae. They are known generally as goatgrasses. Some species are known as invasive weeds in parts of North America.

== Description ==
These are annual plants, sometimes from rhizomes. The taller species reach about 80 centimeters in maximum height. The flat leaves are linear to narrowly lance-shaped, and are up to 15 centimeters long and one wide. The inflorescence is a spike with 2 to 12 solitary spikelets each up to 1.2 centimeters long. Some spikelets have one or three awns, and some have none.

== Origin of wheat ==
Aegilops species are ancestors of emmer and bread wheat.

Genus Aegilops has played an important role in the taxonomy of wheat. The familiar common wheat (Triticum aestivum) arose when cultivated emmer wheat hybridized with Aegilops tauschii about 8,000 years ago. Aegilops and Triticum are genetically similar, as evidenced by their ability to hybridize, and by the presence of Aegilops in the evolutionary heritage of many Triticum taxa. Aegilops is sometimes treated within Triticum. They are maintained as separate genera by most authorities because of their ecological characteristics, and because when united they do not form a monophyletic group (the lowest common class will need to include some other genera).

== Ecology ==
Some Aegilops are known as weeds. A. cylindrica, which is commonly known as jointed goatgrass, infests wheat fields, where it outcompetes wheat plants, reducing yields. Its seeds mix with wheat grains at harvest, lowering the quality of the crop. It can also harbor pests such as the Russian wheat aphid (Diuraphis noxia) and pathogenic fungi. Other Aegilops are weeds of rangeland and wildland habitat.

== Prehistoric wild food source ==
During the Mesolithic era, nomadic peoples found goatgrasses (Aegilops) growing wild, along with wild wheats and barleys, and harvested them using bone sickles inset with sharp flakes of flint. The harvested plants were left to dry for a few days, then the edible grains were separated out from the rest of the plant material by beating the plants with a wooden flail, or by rolling them against a hard surface. The seeds were then carefully singed in the embers of a fire to burn away the remaining non-edible plant material. Some grains were accidentally burnt, and since the charred grains do not biodegrade some have been found by modern archeologists.

== Etymology ==
The genus name Aegilops is botanical Latin and comes from the Ancient Greek αἰγίλωψ (aigílōps), which is of uncertain origin. If the word is from αἴγιλος (aígilos, “goat”) + -ωψ (-ōps, "eye; looking like"), it could mean "goatlike herb", "a herb liked by goats", or perhaps "a grass similar to that liked by goats". On the other hand, it also referred to some species of oak, and since it resembles the Proto-Indo-European word for "oak", *h₂eyǵ-, this could be the source instead. In any case, it may be from the Pre-Greek substratum language.

The word aegilops is claimed to be the longest word in the English language to have all of its letters in alphabetical order, and with no letters repeated.

== Species ==
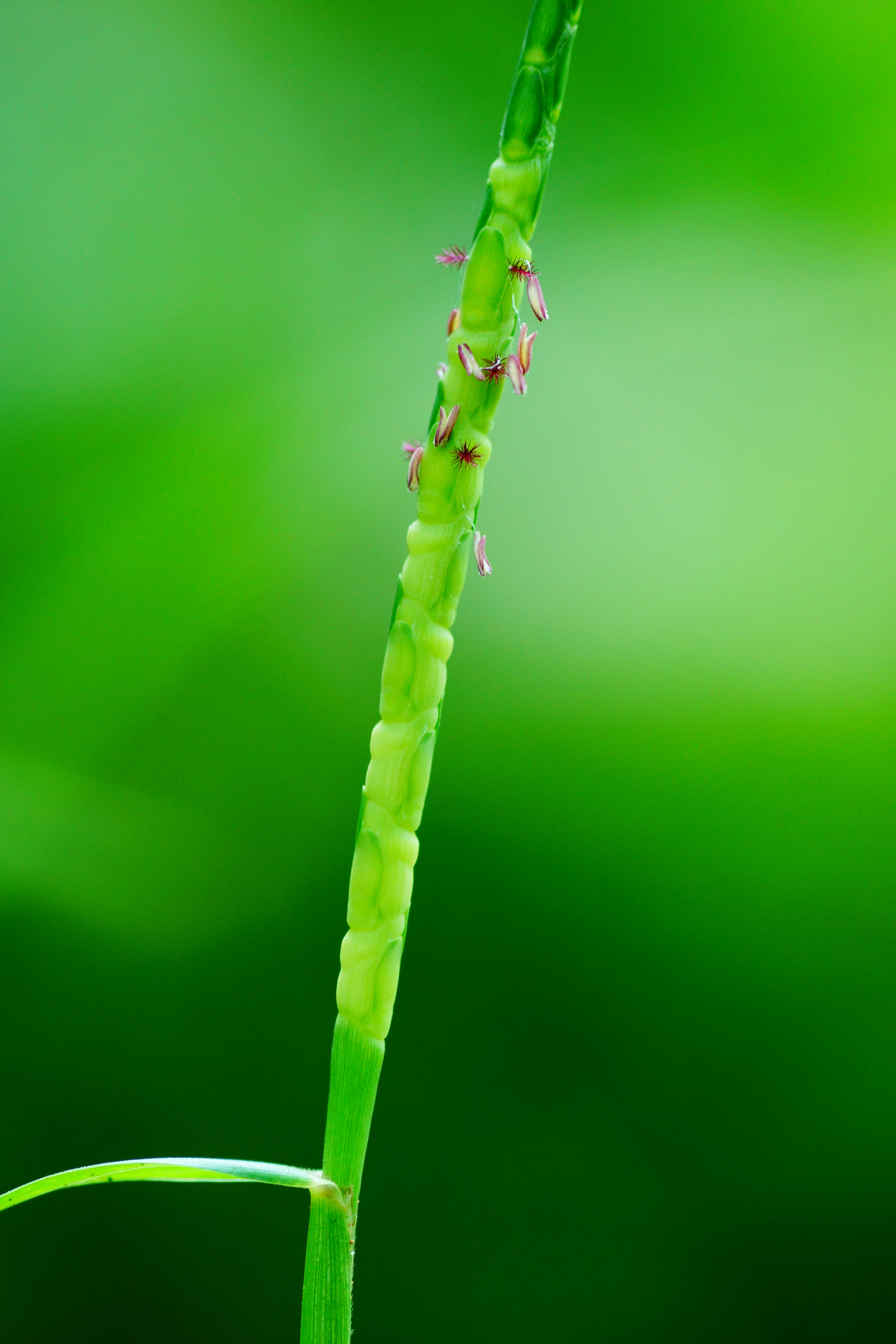
Aegilops tauschii

Accepted species

- Aegilops bicornis - Egypt, Libya, Cyprus, Lebanon, Syria, Palestine, Sinai, Jordan, Israel Kuwait
- Aegilops biuncialis - Mediterranean Basin, Rumenia, Ukraine, Caucasus
- Aegilops caudata - Balkans, Middle East
- Aegilops columnaris - Middle East
- Aegilops comosa - Greece, Turkey
- Aegilops crassa – Persian goatgrass - Middle East to Central Asia
- Aegilops cylindrica – jointed goatgrass - from Czech Republic to Pakistan
- Aegilops geniculata - from Portugal + Canary Islands to Iran
- Aegilops × insulae-cypri - Cyprus
- Aegilops juvenalis - from Turkey to Kazakhstan
- Aegilops kotschyi – ovate goatgrass - from Tunisia to Uzbekistan
- Aegilops longissima - Middle East, Egypt
- Aegilops lorentii - from Spain + Cape Verde to Iran
- Aegilops mutica - Turkey, Transcaucasus
- Aegilops neglecta – three-awned goatgrass - from Portugal + Canary Islands to Kazakhstan
- Aegilops peregrina - from Morocco to Iran
- Aegilops searsii - Syria, Jordan
- Aegilops sharonensis - Israel
- Aegilops speltoides - from Greece to Iran
- Aegilops tauschii - from Crimea to Henan
- Aegilops triuncialis – barbed goatgrass - from Portugal + Morocco to Kazakhstan
- Aegilops umbellulata - from Crimea to Iran
- Aegilops uniaristata - Italy, Balkans, Turkey, Caucasus
- Aegilops vavilovii - from Caucasus to Saudi Arabia
- Aegilops ventricosa - from Morocco + Balearic Islands to Caucasus

Formerly included species

Species once regarded as members of Aegilops but now considered better suited to other genera: Ctenium, Dactyloctenium, Elymus, Eremochloa, Ophiuros, Parapholis, Rottboellia, and Triticum

- Aegilops aromatica - Ctenium aromaticum
- Aegilops ciliaris - Eremochloa pectinata
- Aegilops crithodium - Triticum monococcum subsp. aegilopoides
- Aegilops exaltata - Ophiuros exaltatus
- Aegilops fluviatilis - Rottboellia cochinchinensis
- Aegilops hordeiformis - Triticum monococcum subsp. monococcum
- Aegilops hystrix - Elymus elymoides
- Aegilops incurva - Parapholis incurva
- Aegilops muricata - Eremochloa muricata
- Aegilops saccharina - Dactyloctenium aegyptium

== See also ==
- List of Poaceae genera
