= Streptomyces tritici =

Scientific classification
- Domain: Bacteria
- Kingdom: Bacillati
- Phylum: Actinomycetota
- Class: Actinomycetia
- Order: Streptomycetales
- Family: Streptomycetaceae
- Genus: Streptomyces
- Species: S. tritici

Binomial name
- Streptomyces tritici Zhao et al. 2018

Type strain
- CGMCC 4.7393, DSM 104540, NEAU-A4

Species of bacterium

Streptomyces tritici is a bacterium species from the genus of Streptomyces which has been isolated from rhizosphere soil from the wheat-plant Triticum aestivum.

== See also ==
- List of Streptomyces species
