= Aegilops sharonensis =

Conservation status
- Vulnerable (IUCN 3.1)

Scientific classification
- Kingdom: Plantae
- Clade: Embryophytes
- Clade: Tracheophytes
- Clade: Angiosperms
- Clade: Monocots
- Clade: Commelinids
- Order: Poales
- Family: Poaceae
- Subfamily: Pooideae
- Genus: Aegilops
- Species: A. sharonensis

Binomial name
- Aegilops sharonensis Eig

Species of grass

Aegilops sharonensis is an annual diploid species of grass from the genus Aegilops. It is endemic to the coastal plains of Israel and southern Lebanon.

It has been shown to naturally hybridize with Aegilops longissima.
