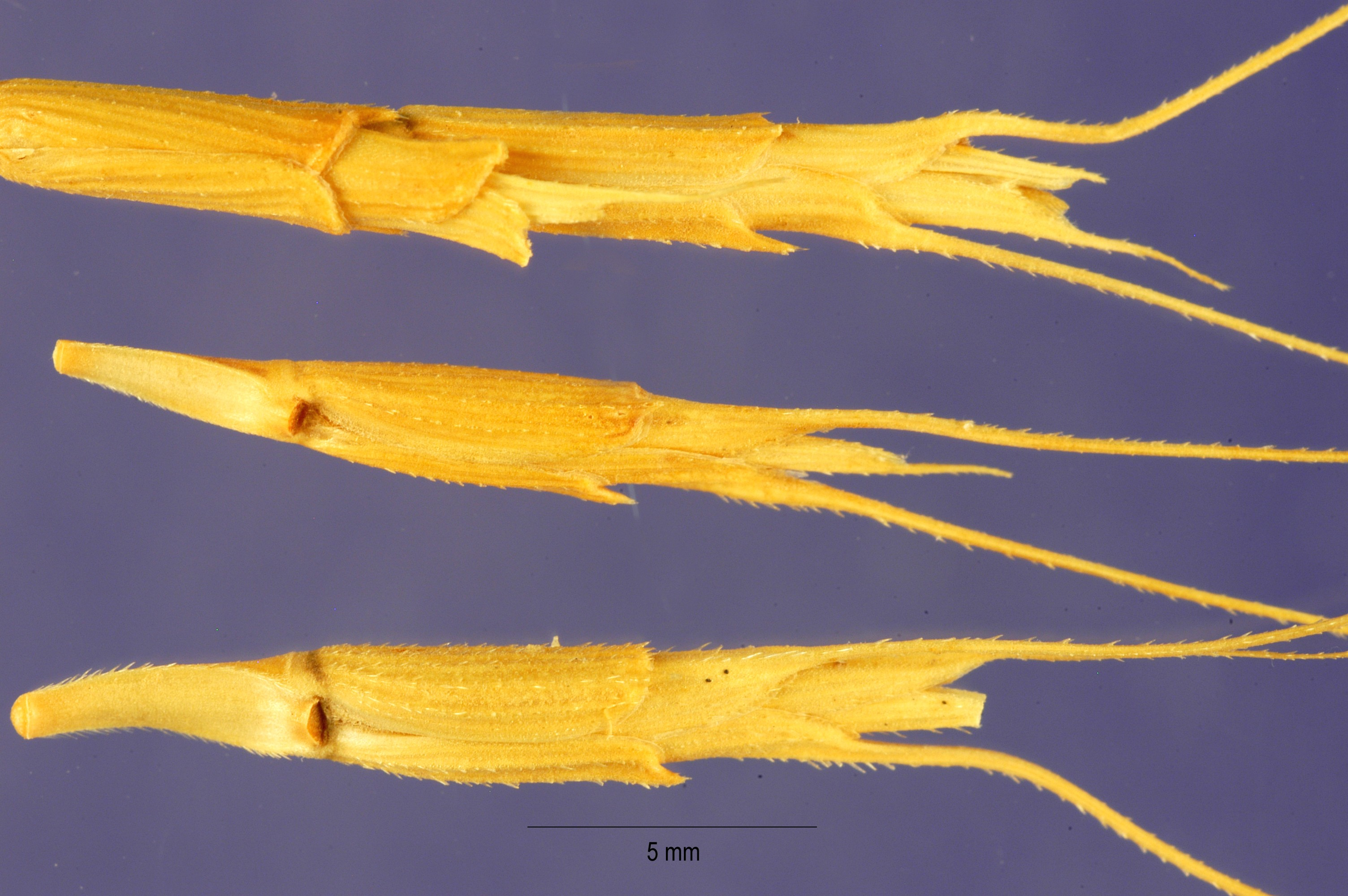

Scientific classification
- Kingdom: Plantae
- Clade: Tracheophytes
- Clade: Angiosperms
- Clade: Monocots
- Clade: Commelinids
- Order: Poales
- Family: Poaceae
- Subfamily: Pooideae
- Genus: Aegilops
- Species: A. speltoides

Binomial name
- Aegilops speltoides Tausch

= Aegilops speltoides =

Species of grass

Aegilops speltoides (syn. Sitopsis speltoides (Tausch) Á.Löve) is an edible goatgrass in the family Poaceae native to Southeastern Europe and Western Asia, which is often used for animal feed, and it has grown in cultivated beds. This plant is an important natural source of disease resistance in wheat, and it is known or likely to be susceptible to barley mild mosaic bymovirus.

== Genome ==
Aegilops speltoides is a diploid of 2n = 2x = 14. A. speltoides is divided into two morphotypes, the dominant ligustica and the recessive aucheri.

== Sources ==
- Brunt, A.A., Crabtree, K., Dallwitz, M.J., Gibbs, A.J., Watson, L. and Zurcher, E.J. (eds.) (1996 onwards). Barley mild mosaic bymovirus. Plant Viruses Online: Descriptions and Lists from the VIDE Database. Version: 20 August 1996.
