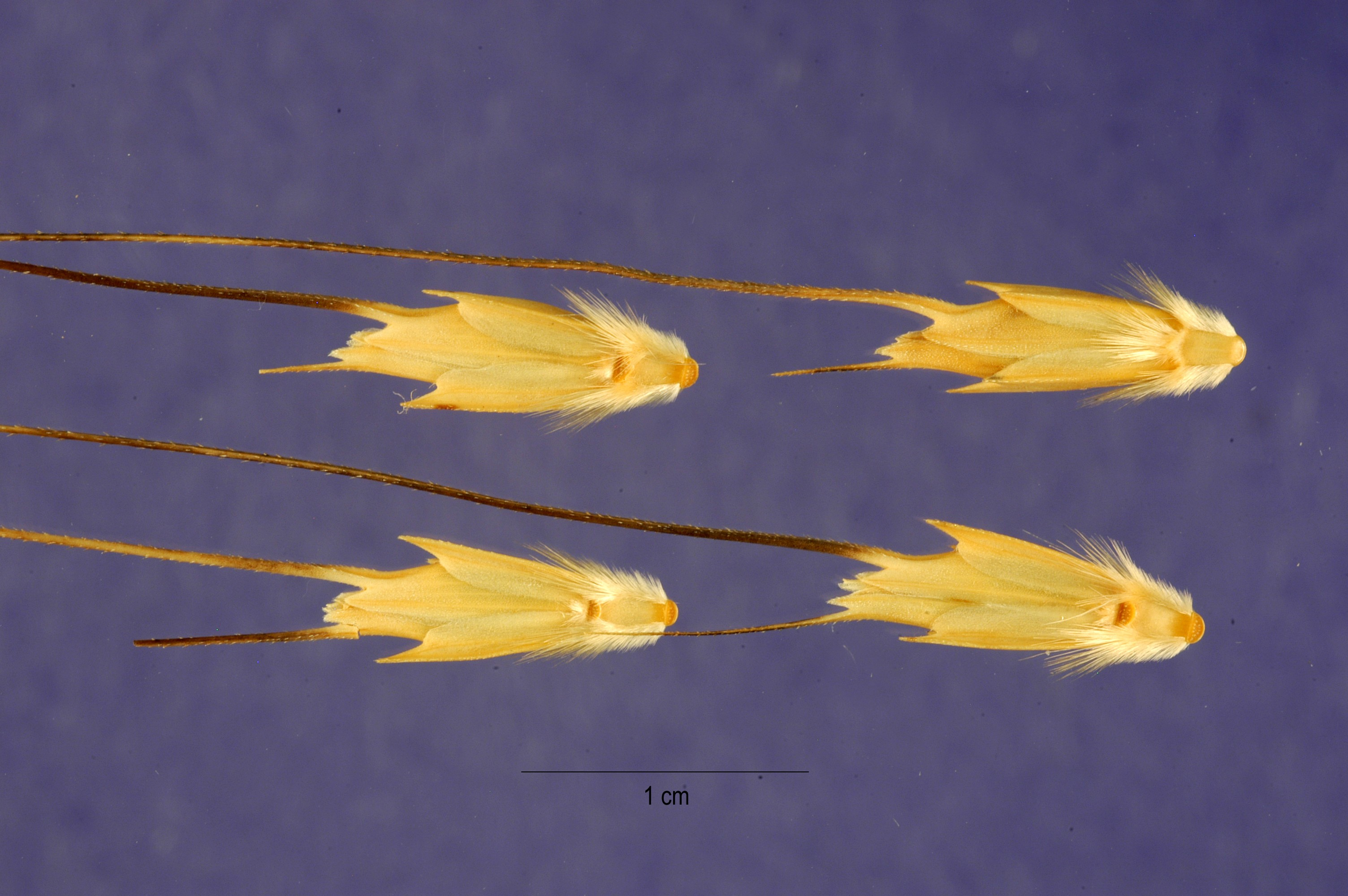

Conservation status
- Near Threatened (IUCN 3.1)

Scientific classification
- Kingdom: Plantae
- Clade: Embryophytes
- Clade: Tracheophytes
- Clade: Angiosperms
- Clade: Monocots
- Clade: Commelinids
- Order: Poales
- Family: Poaceae
- Subfamily: Pooideae
- Genus: Aegilops
- Species: A. bicornis

Binomial name
- Aegilops bicornis (Forssk.) Jaub. & Spach

Synonyms
- Agropyron bicorne (Forssk.) Roem. & Schult.; Crithodium aegyptiacum Trin. ex Steud.; Sitopsis bicornis (Forssk.) Á.Löve; Triticum bicorne Forssk.

= Aegilops bicornis =

Species of grass

Aegilops bicornis (syn. Aegilops bicorne (misapplied), Triticum bicorne Forssk.) is a species in the family Poaceae native to the Levant, Western Mesopotamia, Egypt & Libya

Elsewhere this plant is commonly considered a weed.

== Description ==
This annual, tufted grass has geniculately ascending culms reaching 15 to 45 cm in length. The leaf sheaths feature ciliate oral hairs and falcate auricles, while the ligule is a membranous structure without cilia. The leaf blades, which are either flat or involute, grow between 5 to 10 cm long and 2 to 2.5 mm wide, with a smooth, hairless surface.

=== Flowers ===
The plant produces a single, linear raceme, measuring 5 to 8 cm long, with 12 to 16 fertile spikelets arranged bilaterally along its length. The rachis is fragile at the nodes, with oblong internodes that are about half the length of a fertile spikelet and detach along with the spikelet above

==== Spikelets ====
The fertile spikelets are elliptic, laterally compressed, and range from 5.5 to 8.5 mm in length. Each consists of one or two fertile florets, with diminished florets present at the tip. The spikelets detach as a whole, along with accessory branch structures. A rudimentary sterile spikelet is present at the base, numbering one per raceme.

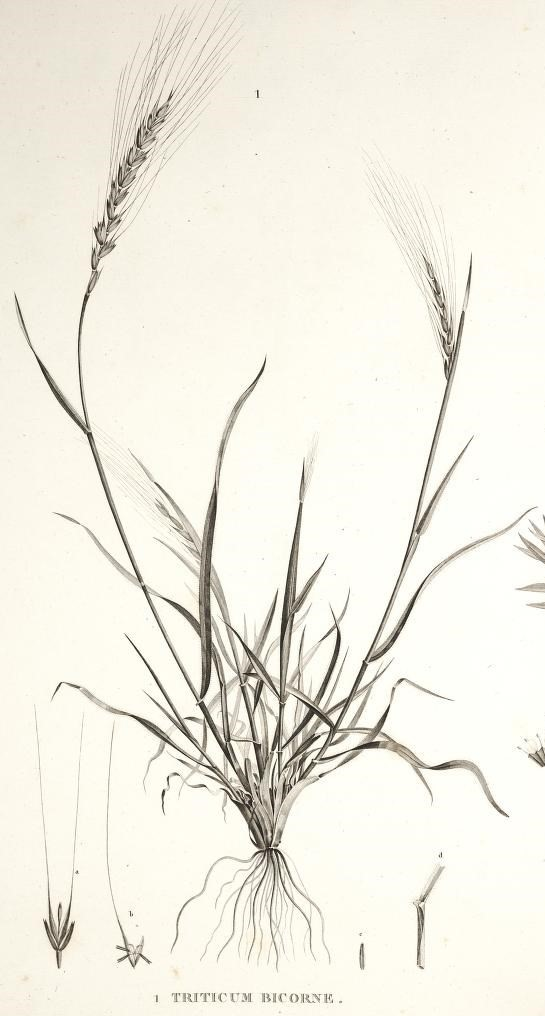
Illustration of Aegilops bicornis (formerly Triticum bicorne)
