= A. neglecta =

A. neglecta may refer to:

- Aegilops neglecta, the three-awned goatgrass, a plant species
- Agave neglecta, the wild century plant, now a synonym of Agave weberi
- Amphisbaena neglecta, a worm lizard species found in Brazil

== See also ==
- Neglecta (disambiguation)
