= Aegilops columnaris =

Scientific classification
- Kingdom: Plantae
- Clade: Tracheophytes
- Clade: Angiosperms
- Clade: Monocots
- Clade: Commelinids
- Order: Poales
- Family: Poaceae
- Subfamily: Pooideae
- Genus: Aegilops
- Species: A. columnaris

Binomial name
- Aegilops columnaris Zhuk.

Species of grass

Aegilops columnaris (syn. Triticum columnare (Zhuk.) Morris & Sears, comb. nov.) is a species in the family Poaceae.
