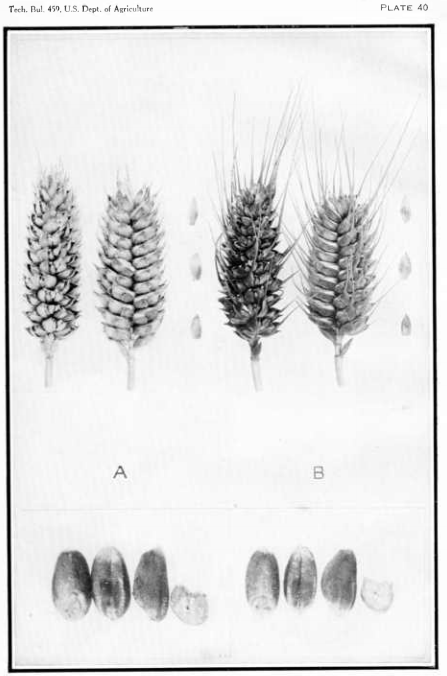
- Triticum compactum humboldtii (A) and Triticum compactum erinaceum (B). Kernels at x3 magnification.

Scientific classification
- Kingdom: Plantae
- Clade: Tracheophytes
- Clade: Angiosperms
- Clade: Monocots
- Clade: Commelinids
- Order: Poales
- Family: Poaceae
- Subfamily: Pooideae
- Genus: Triticum
- Species: T. compactum
- Variety: T. c. var. erinaceum

Trinomial name
- Triticum compactum var. erinaceum (Hornem.) Flaksb.

= Triticum compactum erinaceum =

Extinct subspecies of grass

Triticum compactum erinaceum, also called California Club Wheat or Mayview wheat, is an extinct subspecies of the hexaploid club wheat Triticum compactum. T. compactum erinaceum was a bearded, hairy rachis, red-chaffed wheat named for its appearance similar to that of a hedgehog. T. compactum erinaceum was thought to have disappeared before 1822. However data from the United States Department of Agriculture indicates two additional specimen that were discovered and identified as T. compactum erinaceum more than a hundred years after their presumed disappearance. The new specimen indicate that T. compactum erinaceum was grown in the United States until the Dust Bowl era, at which point it presumably disappeared. There have only been four recorded specimens of T. compactum erinaceum.

== Identification ==
T. compactum erinaceum has a small short brush. Its stem is usually white, but sometimes faintly purple on lower internodes. T. comactum erinaceum has awned spikes (2 to 5 cm long) and a brown, wide, glabrous glume. T. comactum erinaceum usually has rounded shoulders and wide incurved beaks (1 to 4 mm long). The kernels of T. comactum erinaceum are red, short, soft, ovate, humped and curved. Its germ is small and its crease medium to wide and shallow. Its cheeks are usually angular.

== History ==
T. compactum erinaceum was grown alongside other species of wheat by Jesuit Monks in Monterey County California during the late eighteenth century. T. comactum erinaceum was presumed extinct after 1822, but proved to exist when in the summer of 1917 when it was rediscovered by E. F. Gaines, of the Washington Agricultural Experiment Station growing in the vicinity of May View, Washington. Again In 1929 T. compactum erinaceum was reported to be growing, in Douglas County, Oregon, on 322 acres.
