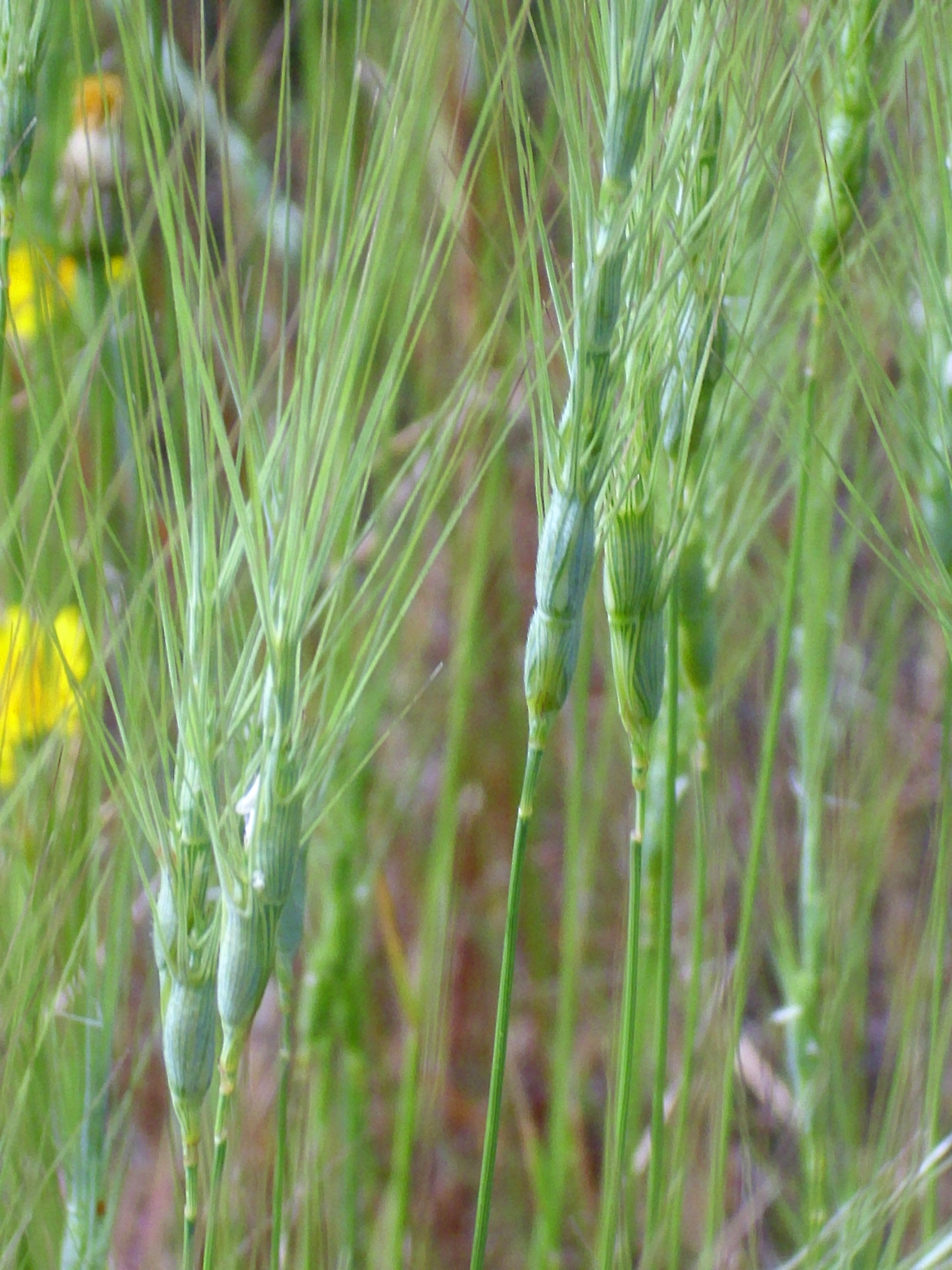

Scientific classification
- Kingdom: Plantae
- Clade: Embryophytes
- Clade: Tracheophytes
- Clade: Angiosperms
- Clade: Monocots
- Clade: Commelinids
- Order: Poales
- Family: Poaceae
- Subfamily: Pooideae
- Genus: Aegilops
- Species: A. triuncialis

Binomial name
- Aegilops triuncialis L.

= Aegilops triuncialis =

Species of grass

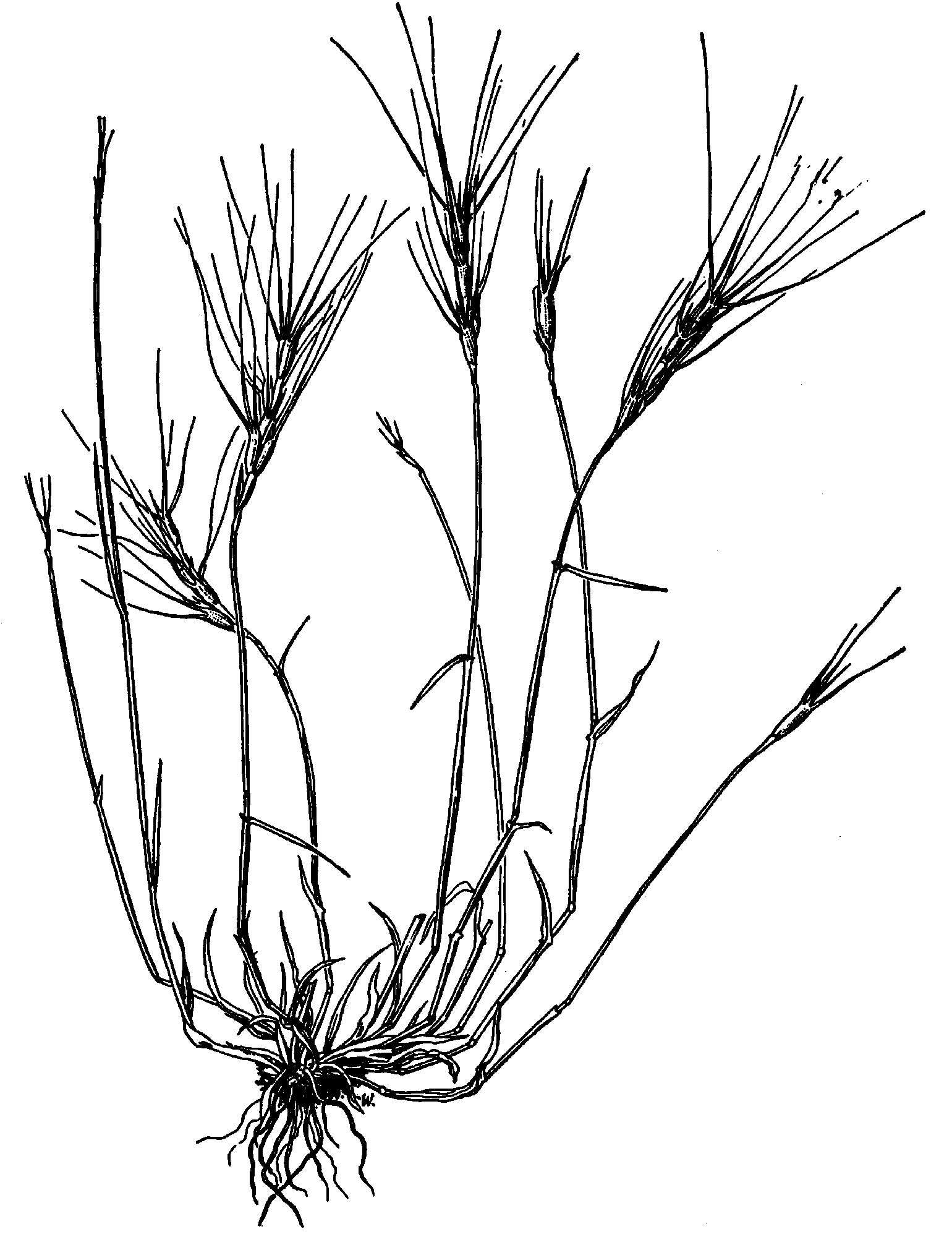
Aegilops triuncialis drawing from Manual of the grasses of the United States, Hitchcock, A.S (1950)

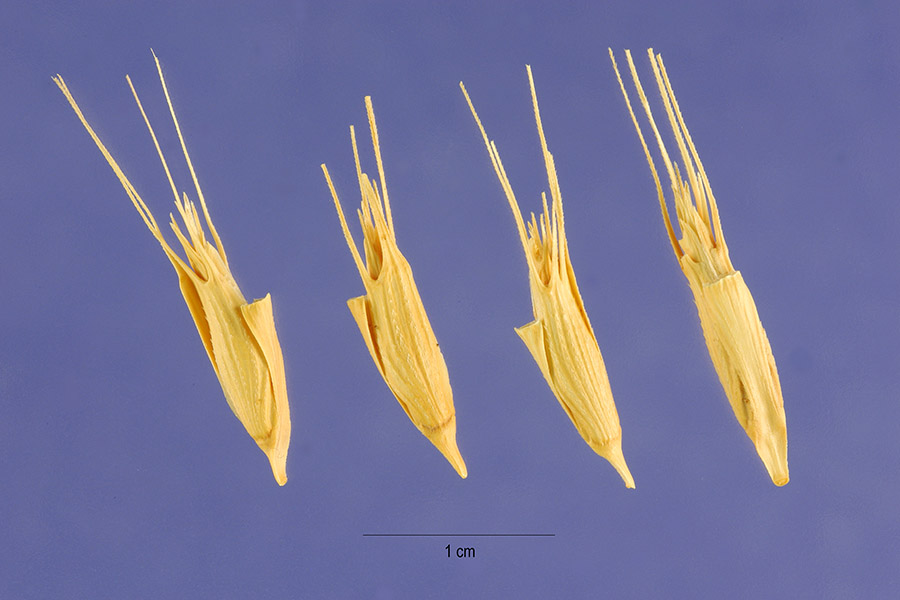
Spikelets of the barbed goatgrass, containing seeds, that become attached to animals, humans, and vehicles, so aiding in the spread of the plant.

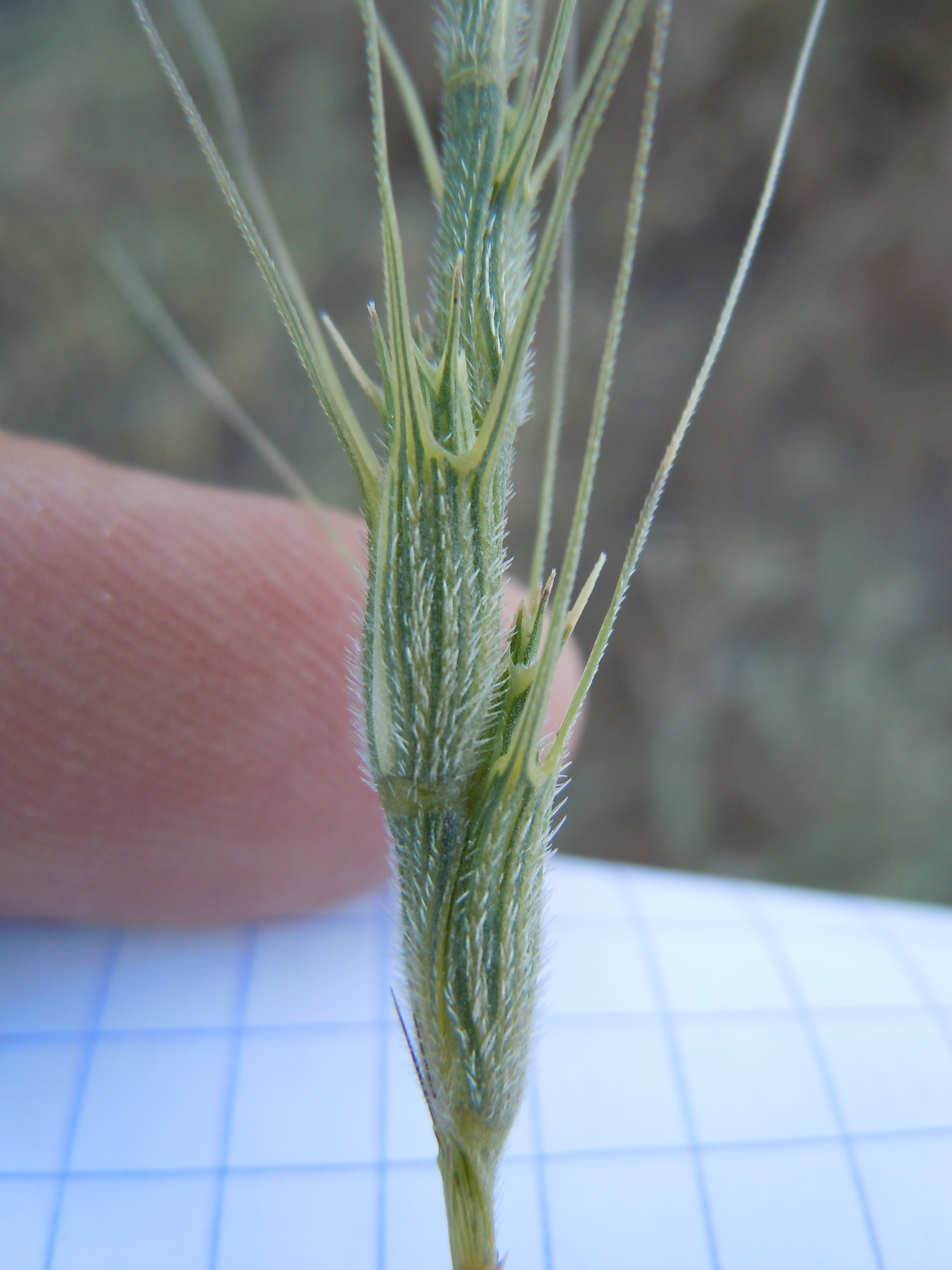
Close-up of flowering spike of Barbed Goatgrass

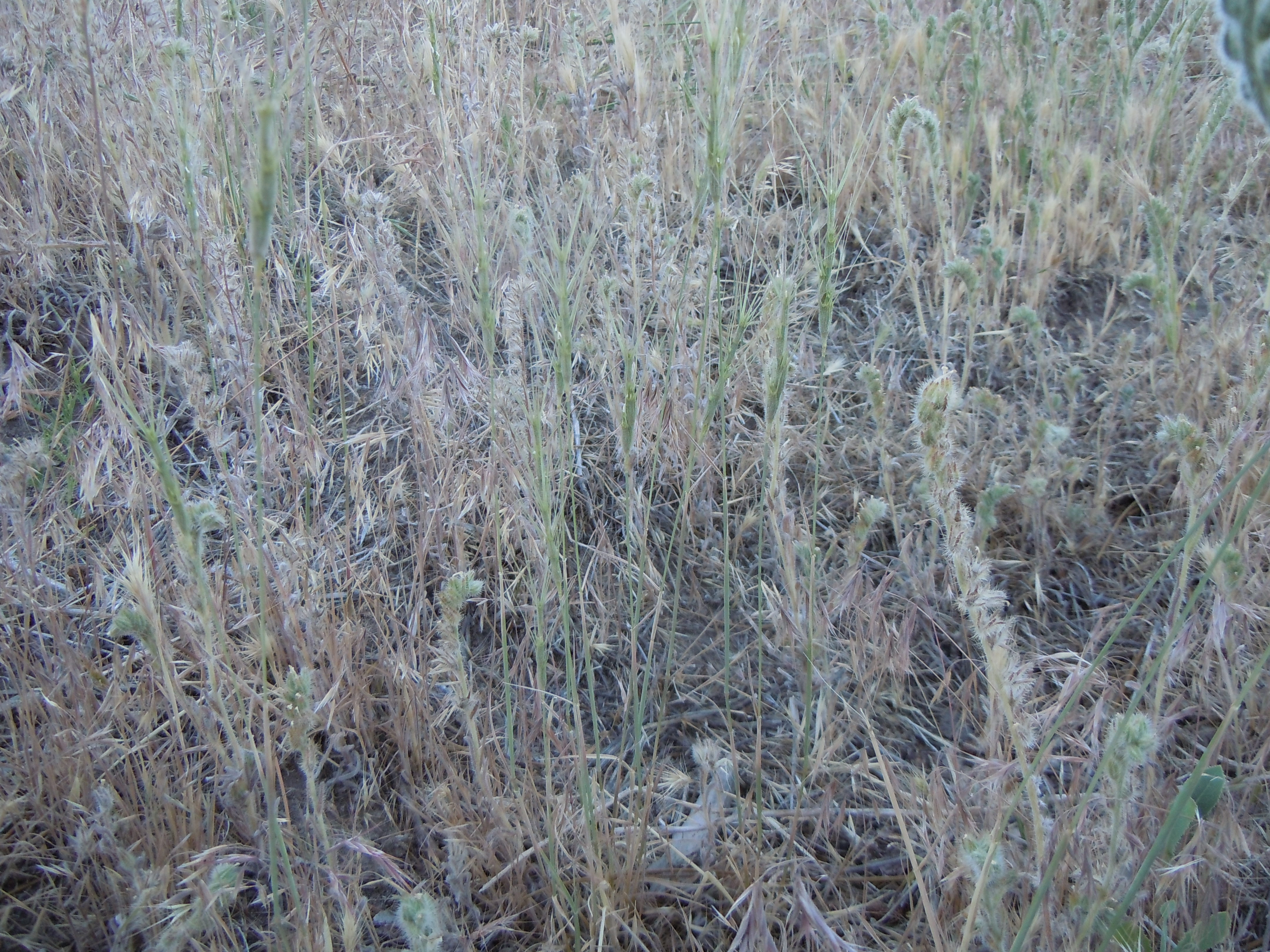
Aegilops triuncialis occurring along roadsides at the base of the Carson Range, Nevada

Aegilops triuncialis, or barbed goatgrass, is a grass species of the family Poaceae. It is a winter annual native to many areas in Eastern and Mediterranean Europe and Western Asia. It is considered an introduced, invasive species in North America, mainly in the Western coast of the United States. In its native lands, the grass thrives in mainly rocky, serpentine soil, but also does well in grasslands and ruderal/disturbed ground as well as oak woodlands.

== Description ==
Barbed goatgrass grows to be about 8 to 16 inches (20 to 41 cm) tall with few to many rigid, loosely erect aerial stems (culms). In late spring the plant produces rigid flower spikes consisting of three to six spikelets bearing long, stiff awns which assist in seed distribution. When the grass matures, the spikelets fall off in their entirety to germinate on the ground, and the long awns which give the plant its name assist in dispersal by animals, wind or water.

== As an invasive species ==
Barbed goatgrass was introduced to North America in the 20th century from Mediterranean Europe and Western Asia. It has been found in California, Oregon, Nevada, and the New England area, but with the greatest impact in California. Barbed goatgrass was introduced to the California area with the trade of Mexican cattle in the early 20th century. The plant's unusual ability to invade nutrient-depleted, infertile soils means that it can severely damage habitats which often serve as important refugia for endemic grassland species which most other invading grasses are unable to exploit.

Barbed goatgrass is a fast-growing, rapidly spreading invasive species mainly in grasslands, pastures, and ranches. It is listed as a noxious weed by California Department of Food and Agriculture. Because of its fast, invasive growing patterns, barbed goatgrass creates a monoculture, killing the other plants in its area. The invasive nature of barbed goatgrass is causing a decrease in species diversity, and a decrease in forage. Most grazing animals tend to avoid barbed goatgrass because they do not like the taste of it, allowing the grass to take over the other grasses and grains consumed by the animals. The barbs on the flower spikelets containing the seeds become attached easily to animal fur, human clothing, and vehicles which allows the seeds to become more widely dispersed over the area.

== Control methods ==
The most important component in the control of barbed goatgrass is early detection. When found in small isolated areas, it can be taken care of more effectively. A recently developed method of assessing greenness in aerial color infrared (CIR) imagery using Normalized Difference Vegetation Index (NDVI) values to differentiate between these invasive weedy grasses and other more innocuous species may help land managers with early detection. Barbed goatgrass matures in late spring after most other annual grasses have already senesced, and this method utilizes these differences in phenology to easily identify patches that require management.

Controlled burning is one method being used by the University of California in small areas to try to control the amount of barbed goatgrass. To be most effective, multiple burns had to be performed in the isolated area over two years to more fully rid the area of the grass. After the burns, many native species were able to live in the small area once again.

Another control method used by the University of California to control barbed goatgrass is the spraying of glyphosate. Used over a two-year period in small areas, glyphosate was able kill barbed goatgrass and all its seedlings. Although the chemical is effective in killing barbed goatgrass, it also kills the other plants in the area. Aminocyclopyrachlor, a new experimental chemical is being used to control barbed goatgrass by the University of California's Weed Science department. It has been shown to be extremely effective, however, aminocyclopyrachlor is not a registered herbicide and as such, widespread use is not yet allowed.

Mowing of the grass is another control method. It allows the grass to be cut before maturing and developing seeds to reproduce, but it is not as effective as the other methods as the deep and established root system of the barbed goatgrass is still in place and can grow again.

== Impact on humans ==
Although there are many ways to control the growth of barbed goatgrass, a real solution has not been found in its widespread prevention. Barbed goatgrass cross breeds with different types of wheat, causing the grain to become infertile and unusable for harvest, which hurts the economy of the rural California areas. It can also seriously harm grazing animals by the barbs becoming embedded in their nose, mouth, and eyes, causing farmers and ranchers extra expenses. It reduces the amount of forage in the area, decreases biodiversity and overall degrades the ecosystem it resides in. Studies of the University of California also show that if climate change increased the amount of precipitation in the area, the amount of barbed goatgrass may increase, destroying even more of its ecosystem. Its rapid growth and resiliency against control methods prove that barbed goatgrass is an invasive species that could cause many more problems to the agriculture of California and possibly many other areas if it is not taken care of soon.
