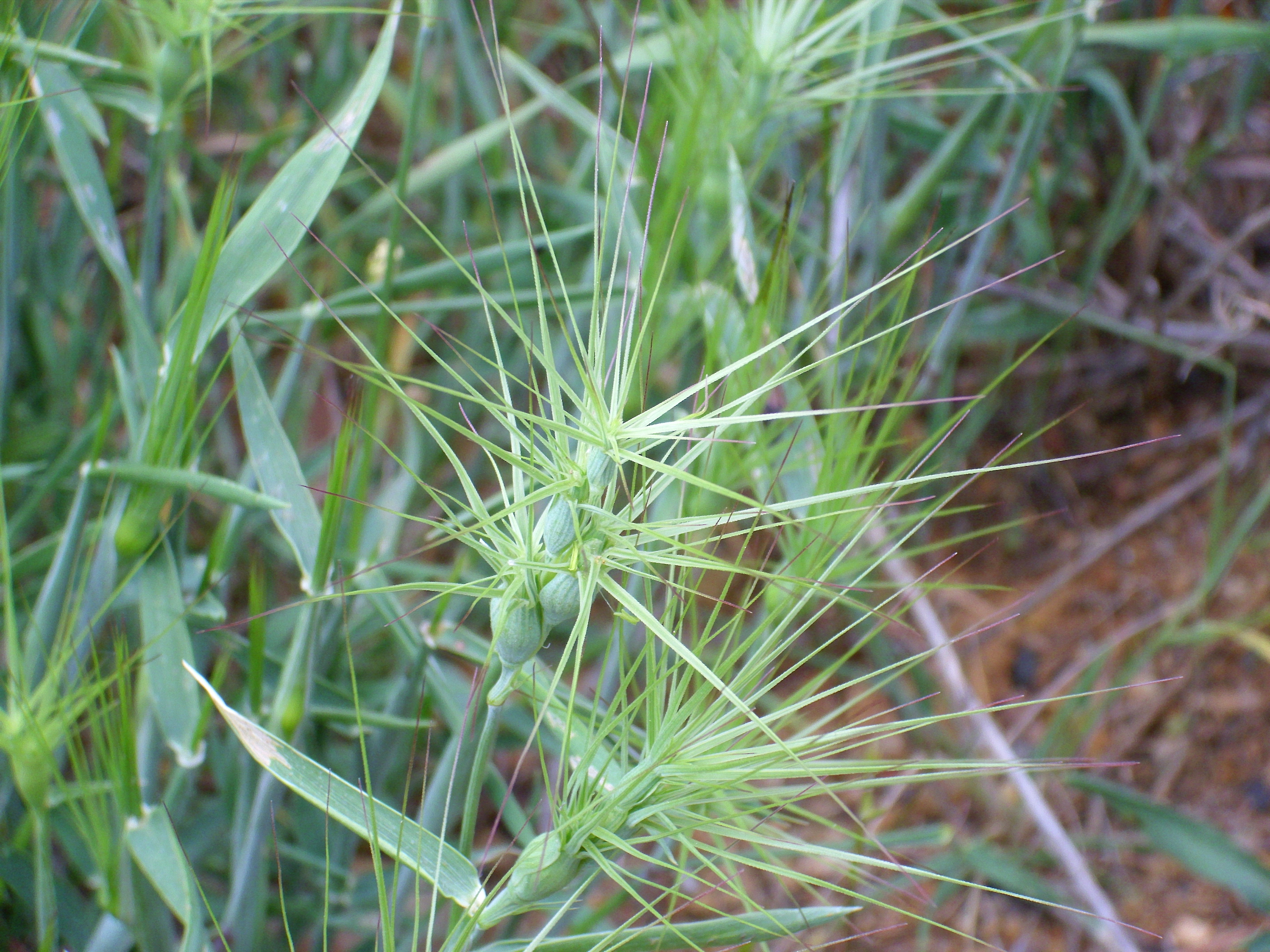

Scientific classification
- Kingdom: Plantae
- Clade: Tracheophytes
- Clade: Angiosperms
- Clade: Monocots
- Clade: Commelinids
- Order: Poales
- Family: Poaceae
- Subfamily: Pooideae
- Genus: Aegilops
- Species: A. geniculata

Binomial name
- Aegilops geniculata Roth, 1787

Synonyms
- Aegilops ovata Triticum ovatum

= Aegilops geniculata =

Species of grass

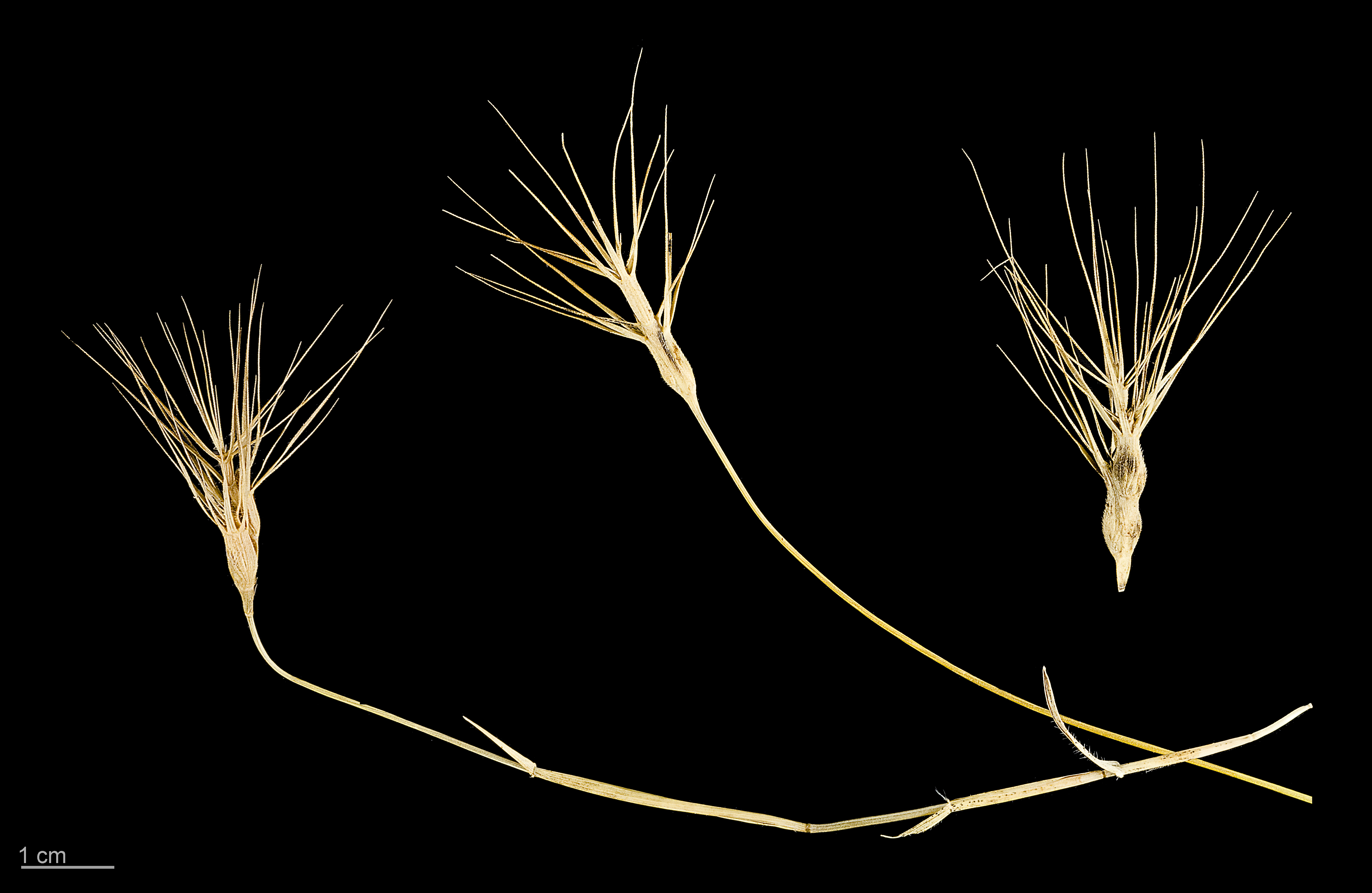
Aegilops geniculata - MHNT

Aegilops geniculata is a species of grass known by the common name ovate goatgrass. It is native to the Mediterranean and western Asia, including Palestine and the Levant.

Elsewhere it is known as a noxious weed.

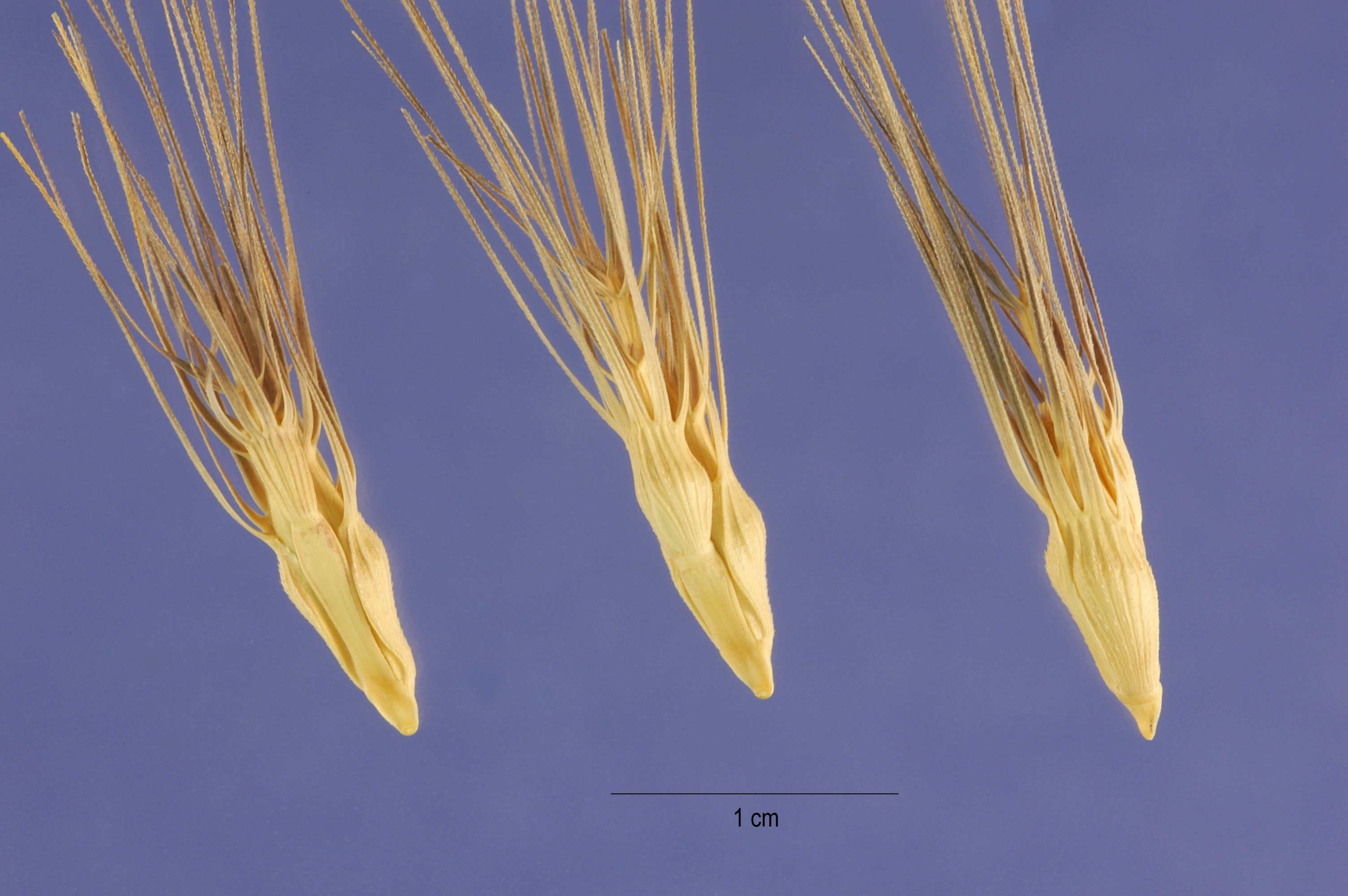
