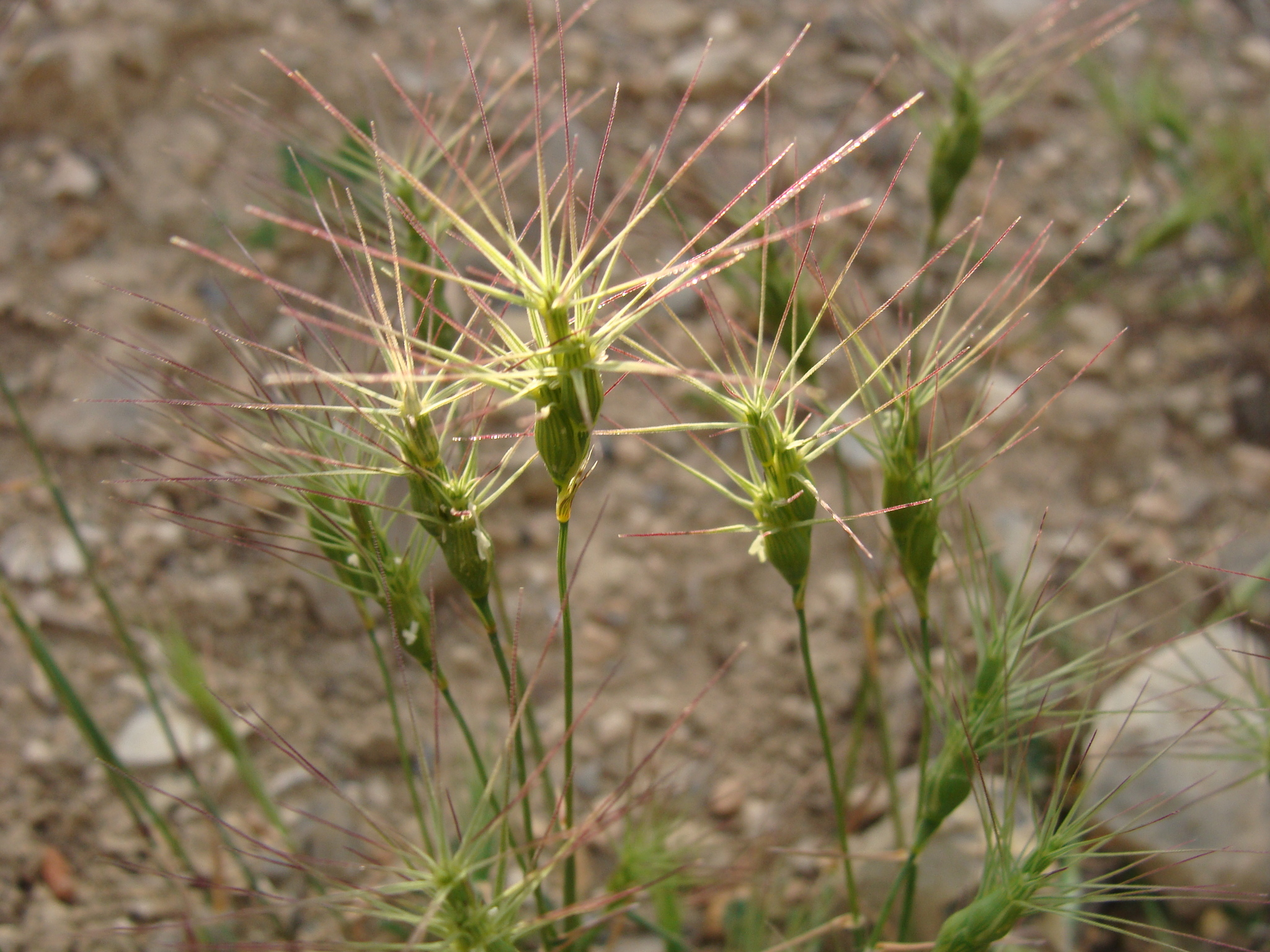

Conservation status
- Least Concern (IUCN 3.1)

Scientific classification
- Kingdom: Plantae
- Clade: Tracheophytes
- Clade: Angiosperms
- Clade: Monocots
- Clade: Commelinids
- Order: Poales
- Family: Poaceae
- Subfamily: Pooideae
- Genus: Aegilops
- Species: A. biuncialis

Binomial name
- Aegilops biuncialis Vis.

Synonyms
- List: Aegilops biaristata Lojac.; Aegilops biuncialis subsp. archipelagica (Eig) Raus; Aegilops biuncialis var. tenacissima H.Scholz; Aegilops connata Steud.; Aegilops intermedia Steud.; Aegilops lorentii Hochst.; Aegilops lorentii var. archipelagica (Eig) K.Hammer; Aegilops lorentii subsp. archipelagica (Eig) Á.Löve; Aegilops lorentii subsp. pontica (Degen) Á.Löve; Aegilops lorentii var. velutina (Zhuk.) K.Hammer; Aegilops macrochaeta Shuttlew. & A.Huet ex Duval; Aegilops pontica (Degen) Waleff; Aegilops trispiculata (Hack. ex Trab.) Trab.; Triticum biunciale (Vis.) K.Richt.; Triticum lorentii (Hochst.) Zeven; Triticum macrochaetum (Shuttlew. & A.Huet ex Duval) K.Richt.

= Aegilops biuncialis =

Species of grass

Aegilops biuncialis is a species of plant in the family Poaceae native to the Mediterranean, Black Sea, and Middle East.
