= Spack =

Spack is a surname. Notable people with the surname include:

- Brock Spack (born 1962), American football coach
- Daniel Spack, American musician
- Norman Spack, American pediatric endocrinologist

== See also ==
- Spach
