= Aegilops juvenalis =

Scientific classification
- Kingdom: Plantae
- Clade: Tracheophytes
- Clade: Angiosperms
- Clade: Monocots
- Clade: Commelinids
- Order: Poales
- Family: Poaceae
- Subfamily: Pooideae
- Genus: Aegilops
- Species: A. juvenalis

Binomial name
- Aegilops juvenalis (Thell.) Eig

Species of grass

Aegilops juvenalis (syn. Aegilops turcomanica Roshev., Triticum juvenale Thell.) is a species in the family Poaceae.
