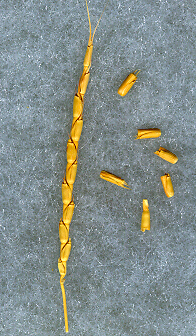

Scientific classification
- Kingdom: Plantae
- Clade: Embryophytes
- Clade: Tracheophytes
- Clade: Angiosperms
- Clade: Monocots
- Clade: Commelinids
- Order: Poales
- Family: Poaceae
- Subfamily: Pooideae
- Genus: Aegilops
- Species: A. tauschii

Binomial name
- Aegilops tauschii Coss.

Synonyms
- List: Aegilops strangulata (Eig) Tzvelev; Aegilops tauschii var. anathera (Eig) K.Hammer; Aegilops tauschii f. brunnea (Popova) K.Hammer; Aegilops tauschii f. ferruginea (Popova) K.Hammer; Aegilops tauschii var. meyeri (Griseb.) Tzvelev; Aegilops tauschii convar. paleidenticulata Gandilyan; Aegilops tauschii var. paleidenticulata (Gandilyan) K.Hammer; Patropyrum tauschii (Coss.) Á.Löve; Patropyrum tauschii subsp. salinum (Zhuk.) Á.Löve; Patropyrum tauschii subsp. strangulatum (Eig) Á.Löve; Triticum tauschii (Coss.) Schmalh.

= Aegilops tauschii =

Species of grass

Aegilops tauschii, the Tausch's goatgrass or rough-spike hard grass, is an annual grass species. It is native to Crimea, the Caucasus region, western and Central Asia, Afghanistan, Pakistan, the western Himalaya, and parts of China, and has been introduced to other locales, including California.

== Taxonomy ==
Aegilops tauschii is part of the tribe Triticeae, along with wheat. It is a diploid (2n=2x=14, DD) goatgrass species which has contributed the D genome to common wheat.

== Genome ==
Zimin et al., 2016 provides a genome assembly.

The Lr42 nucleotide-binding site leucine-rich repeat (NLR) is a resistance gene used in hexaploid wheat but originating in this species. Lr42 confers all-stage resistance to leaf rust. Lin et al., 2022 localize Lr42 to AET1Gv20040300 by cloning and sequence- and functional-analyses.

== Subspecies ==
The following subspecies are accepted:

- Aegilops tauschii subsp. strangulata (Eig) Tzvelev – western part of range
- Aegilops tauschii subsp. tauschii
