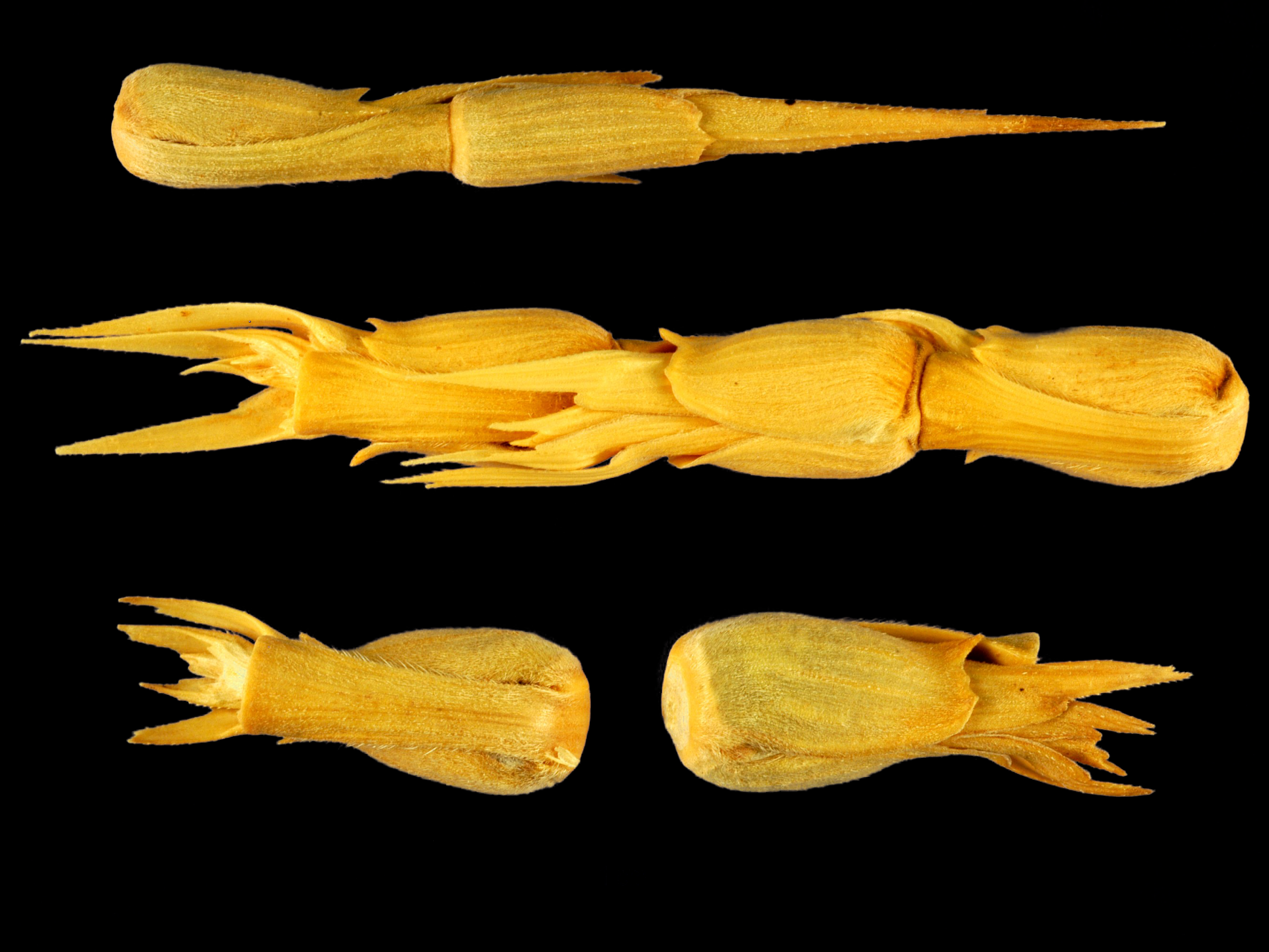

Conservation status
- Least Concern (IUCN 3.1)

Scientific classification
- Kingdom: Plantae
- Clade: Embryophytes
- Clade: Tracheophytes
- Clade: Spermatophytes
- Clade: Angiosperms
- Clade: Monocots
- Clade: Commelinids
- Order: Poales
- Family: Poaceae
- Subfamily: Pooideae
- Genus: Aegilops
- Species: A. crassa

Binomial name
- Aegilops crassa Boiss. ex Hohen.

Synonyms
- Aegilops trivialis Migush. & Khak. Gastropyrum crassum (Boiss. ex Hohen.) Á.Löve; Triticum crassum (Boiss. ex Hohen.) Aitch. & Hemsl.

= Aegilops crassa =

Species of grass

Aegilops crassa is an ornamental plant in the family Poaceae. It is referred to by the common name Persian goatgrass. It is native to Afghanistan, Egypt, Iran, Iraq, Kazakhstan, Kyrgyzstan, Lebanon, Palestine, Syria, Tajikistan, Transcaucasia, Turkey, Turkmenistan, and Uzbekistan.
