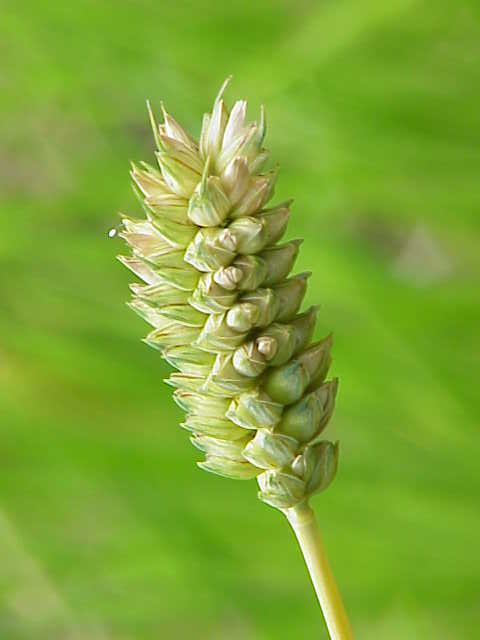

Scientific classification
- Kingdom: Plantae
- Clade: Tracheophytes
- Clade: Angiosperms
- Clade: Monocots
- Clade: Commelinids
- Order: Poales
- Family: Poaceae
- Subfamily: Pooideae
- Genus: Triticum
- Species: T. compactum

Binomial name
- Triticum compactum Host

Subspecies
- T. compactum humboldtii T. compactum erinaceum T. compactum wernerianum T. compactum rufulum T. compactum wittmaddanum

= Triticum compactum =

Species of grass

Triticum compactum or club wheat is a species of wheat adapted to low-humidity growing conditions. T. compactum is similar enough to common wheat (T. aestivum) that it is often considered a subspecies, T. aestivum compactum. It can be distinguished by its more compact ear due to shorter rachis segments, giving it its common name. In the United States of America, nearly all T. compactum is grown in dry areas of the Pacific Northwest.

T. compactum is a hexaploid with 42 chromosomes. T. compactum, like other club wheats, has been selectively bred for its lower protein content. Due to the process of selective breeding T. compactum has fewer HMW-glutenin genes than other species of wheat. Flour made from T. compactum is thus better suited for the production of cookies. T. compactum like other bread wheats have never been observed to grow in the wild.

== History ==
=== Middle East and Europe ===
The oldest primitive forms of T. compactum appear to have first arisen, along with similar wheats, in Neolithic Syria. From Syria T. compactum spread to Europe and was considered to be the oldest wheat species cultivated in Europe until the 1940s when older tetraploid varieties of wheat were identified. T. compactum appears in Europe for the first time during the Neolithic Era reaching as far as Spain by 4600 BC. Evidence of T. compactum in Portugal and France demonstrates that the Romans cultivated T. compactum on the Iberian peninsula during the first and second centuries BCE. Evidence of T. compactum found along with barley in an east Finnish settlement reveals that T. compactum was cultivated in Finland starting between fifth and seventh centuries AD.

=== North America ===
T. compactum was believed to have been introduced to North America from Chile by Pacific shipping routes during the 1960s and 1970s. However analysis of adobe bricks in San Antonio, San Fernando, Soledad, San José, San Juan Bautista and Sonoma missions revealed that T. compactum was present in California by the year 1787 and was likely introduced by Spaniards through Mexico.T. compactum was farmed extensively during the beginning of California's agricultural history. Data even suggests that T. compactum was farmed more than the related T. aestivum during this time. T. compactum erinaceum, also called California Club Wheat, was a bearded, hairy rachis, red-chaffed subspecies of T. compactum that is thought to have disappeared before 1822. As production of American wheat drastically increased during the early twentieth century T. aestivum rose in popularity surpassing T. compactum. Today most T. compactum is grown alongside T. aestivum because of their similar nature.

== Morphology ==
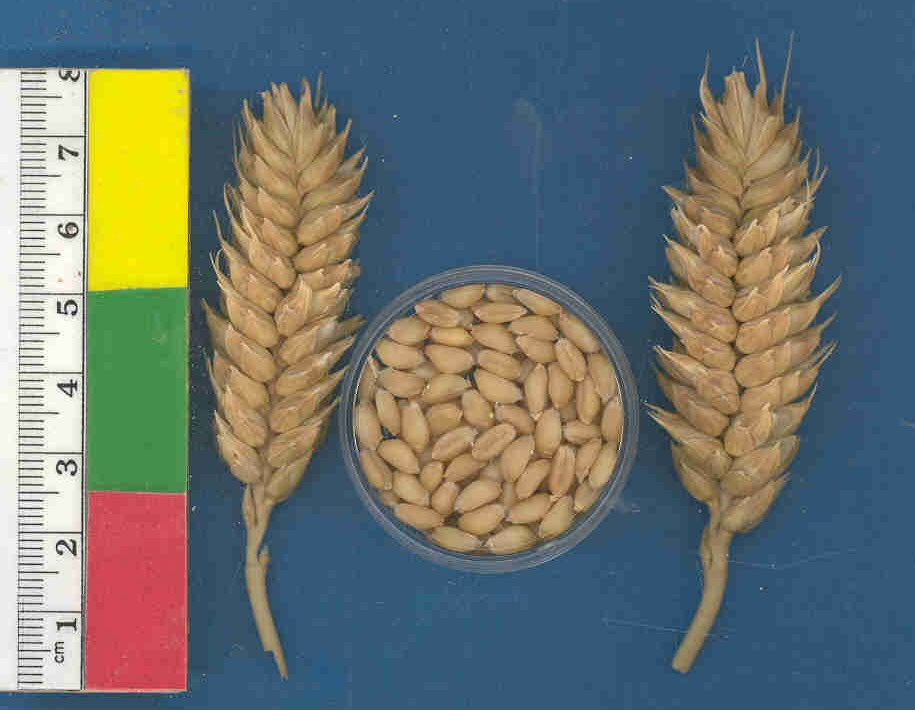
Ears of T. compactum

T. compactum is small free-threshing club wheat with rounded grains. In T. compactum, like other bread and club wheats, there is a keel on the upper section of the otherwise flat glume. T. compactum characteristically has a smaller, crooked crease than other species of wheat and smaller cheek size at the brush end.

== Identification ==
T. compactum is identifiable from T. aestivum mainly by its shorter rachis segments and compact ear for which it is named. The now extinct subspecies of T. compactum, T. compactum erinaceum or California club wheat, can be distinguished from other subspecies by its red chaff and hairier rachides. The below chart indicates the physiological factors that can be used to distinguish between various subspecies and varieties of T. compactum:

- Triticum compactum
  - Spike awnless
    - Glumes glabrous
      - Glumes white
        - Kernels white
          - Triticum compactum humboldtii
            - Soft to semi‑hard
              - Winter habit
                - Hybrid 128
                - var. Albit
              - Intermediate habit
                - Hybrid 143
              - Spring habit
                - Plant short
                  - var. Poso
                - Plant tall
                  - var. Little club
                  - var Big club
            - Semi‑hard to hard
              - Hybrid 63
        - Kernels red
          - Triticum compactum wernerianum
            - Hybrid 123
      - Glumes brown
        - Kernels white
          - Triticum compactum rufulum
            - Winter habit
              - var. Genro
            - Spring habit
              - Spike oblong‑fusiform
                - spike mid‑dense
                  - var. Hood
                - spike dense
                  - var. Jenkin
              - Spike clávate
                - Glumes light‑brown
                  - var. Redchaff
                - Glumes bluish‑brown
                  - var. Bluechaff
    - Glumes pubescent
      - Glumes brown
        - Kernels white
          - Triticum compactum wittmaddanum
            - var. Coppei
  - Spike awned
    - Glumes glabrous
      - Glumes brown
        - Kernels red
          - Triticum compactum erinaceum
            - var. Mayview

=== Fossilized specimen ===
Most ancient T. compactum was cultivated between the Neolithic era and the Bronze Age and thus the most common evidence of ancient T. compactum is carbonized. Although carbonized wheat may often resemble its unfossilized counterpart and can often be identified with the same methods described above it is sometimes difficult to distinguish carbonized wheat this way due to a damaged or incomplete specimen. As a general rule, if a naked wheat, wheat with round grains and irregularly broken rachis forming internodes, is uncovered in a European site, excluding all sites on the Italian or Balkan peninsulas, it should be considered a hexaploid club wheat (either T. aestivum or T. compactum ). If such wheat has short internodes it should be identified as T. compactum.

== Agronomy ==
In the northern hemisphere Triticum compactum generally flowers during the months of June and July with its seeds ripening in August and September. Triticum compactum is an annual plant growing to heights of approximately 0.6 meters in the summer and dying in the winter.
