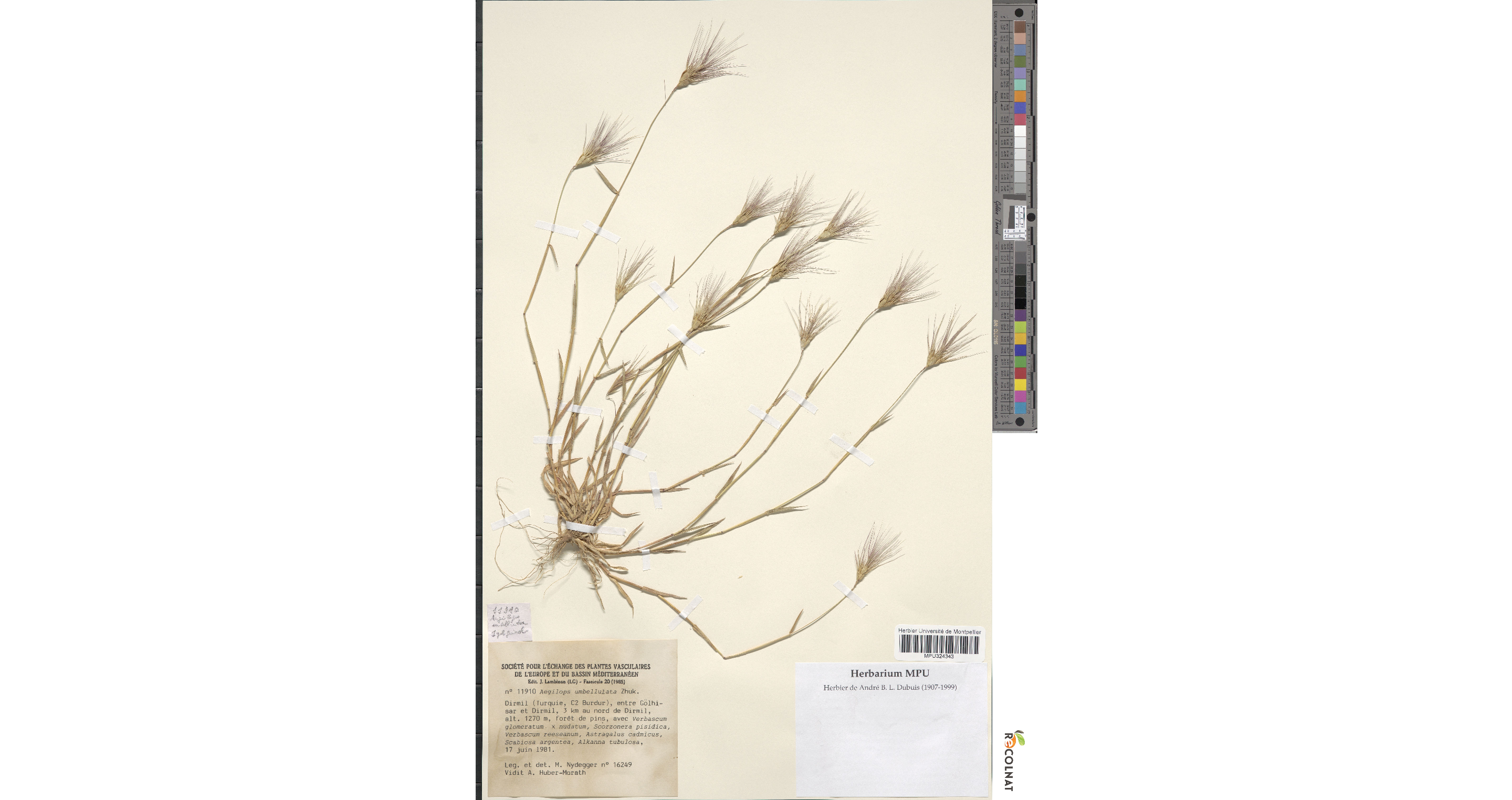

Conservation status
- Least Concern (IUCN 3.1)

Scientific classification
- Kingdom: Plantae
- Clade: Tracheophytes
- Clade: Angiosperms
- Clade: Monocots
- Clade: Commelinids
- Order: Poales
- Family: Poaceae
- Subfamily: Pooideae
- Genus: Aegilops
- Species: A. umbellulata

Binomial name
- Aegilops umbellulata Zhuk.

Synonyms
- Aegilops umbellulata var. typica Eig; Kiharapyrum umbellulatum (Zhuk.) Á.Löve; Triticum umbellulatum (Zhuk.) Bowden

= Aegilops umbellulata =

Species of grass

Aegilops umbellulata, the umbel goatgrass, is an annual grass that is closesly related to wheat. It is native to southeastern Europe (including the East Aegean Islands), Iran, Iraq, Lebanon, Syria, the Transcaucasus, and Turkey.

The hybridisation between this species and wheat is known to produce rust resistant plants.
