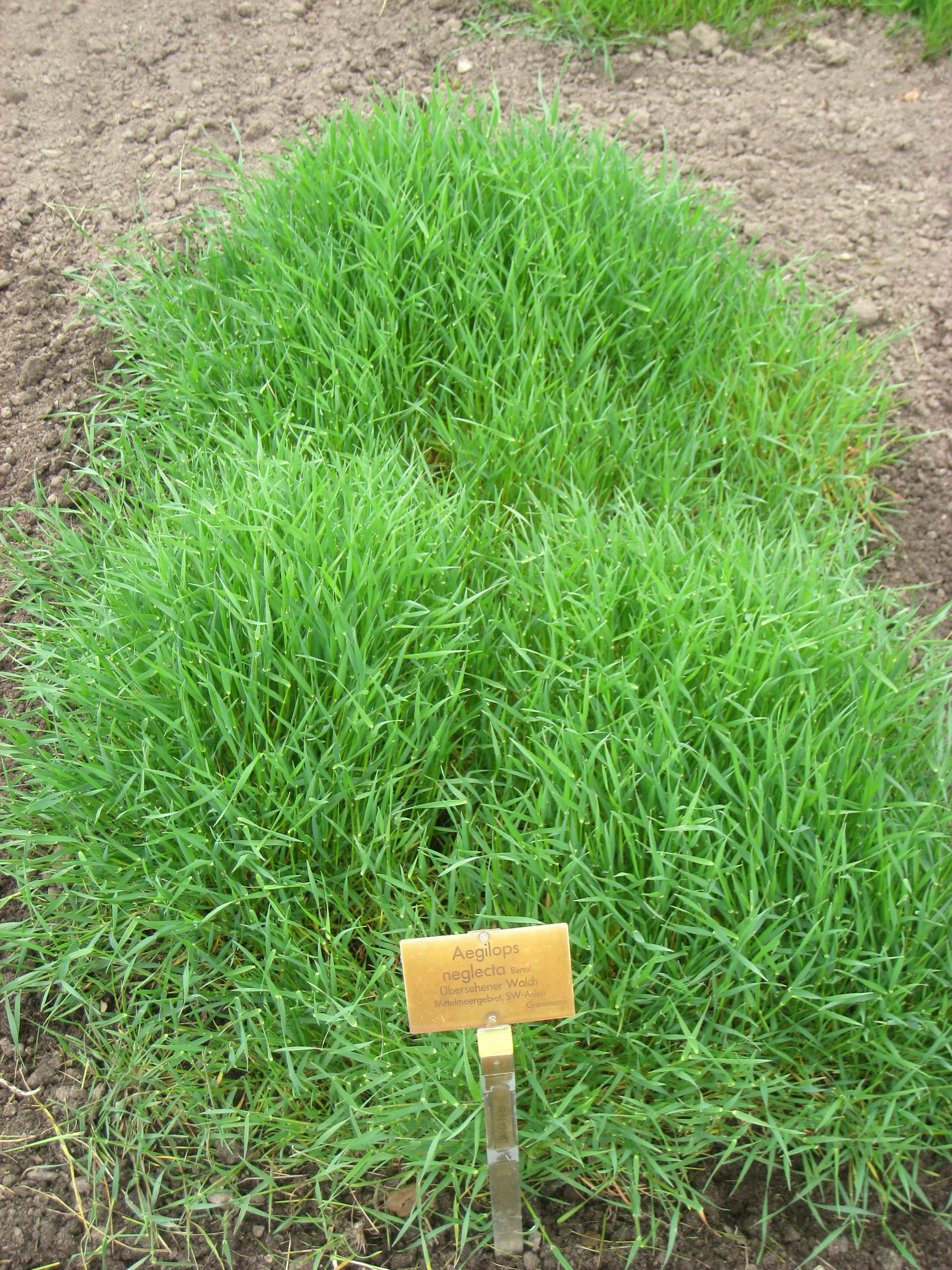

Scientific classification
- Kingdom: Plantae
- Clade: Tracheophytes
- Clade: Angiosperms
- Clade: Monocots
- Clade: Commelinids
- Order: Poales
- Family: Poaceae
- Subfamily: Pooideae
- Genus: Aegilops
- Species: A. neglecta

Binomial name
- Aegilops neglecta Req. ex Bertol.

= Aegilops neglecta =

Species of grass

Aegilops neglecta, common name three-awn goat grass, is a species in the family Poaceae.
