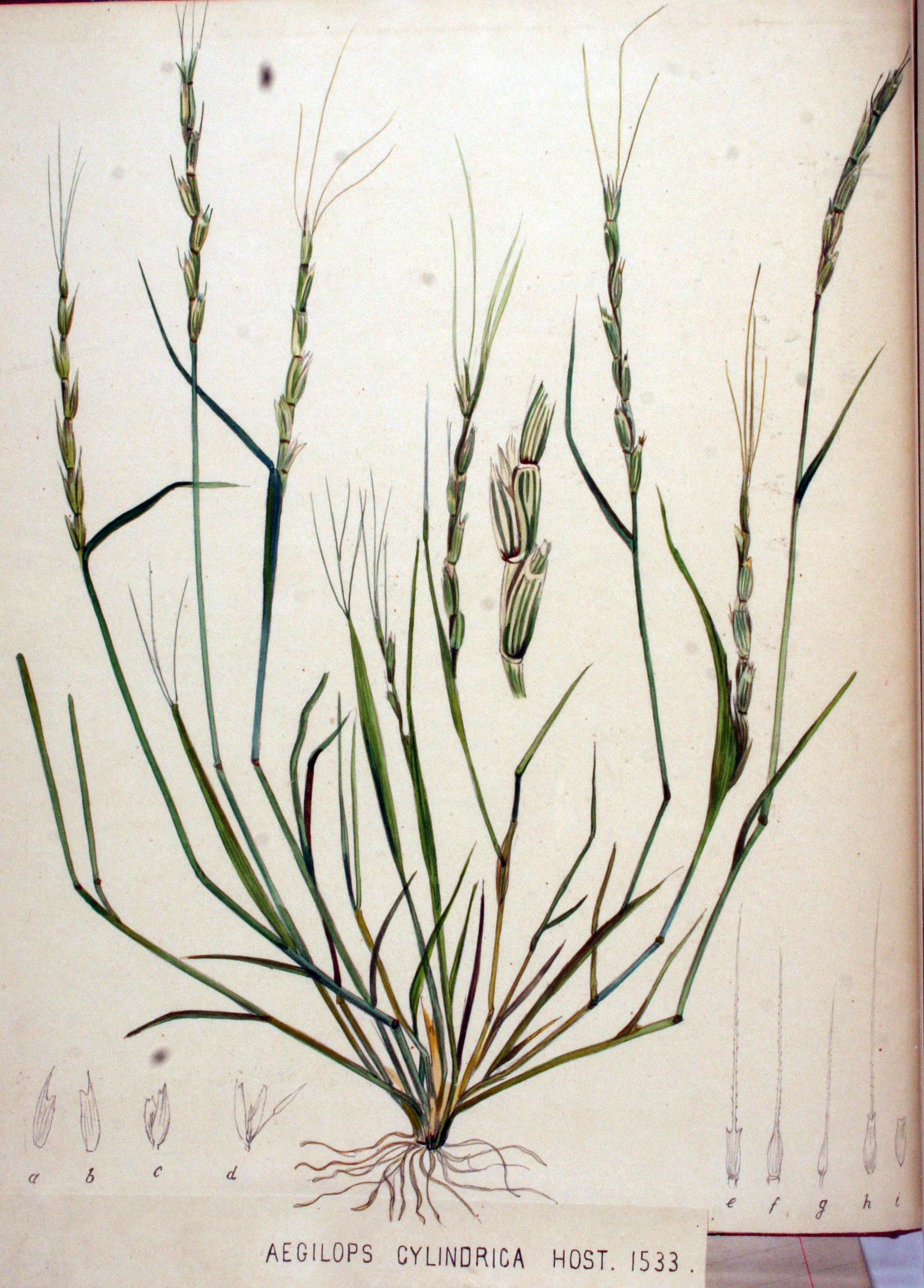

Conservation status
- Least Concern (IUCN 3.1)

Scientific classification
- Kingdom: Plantae
- Clade: Tracheophytes
- Clade: Angiosperms
- Clade: Monocots
- Clade: Commelinids
- Order: Poales
- Family: Poaceae
- Subfamily: Pooideae
- Genus: Aegilops
- Species: A. cylindrica

Binomial name
- Aegilops cylindrica Host

Synonyms
- List: Aegilops caudata subsp. cylindrica (Host) Hegi; Aegilops cylindrica var. typica Eig; Aegilops nova Winterl ex Borbás; Aegilops squarrosa var. cylindrica (Host) Mutel; Cylindropyrum cylindricum (Host) Á.Löve; Triticum caudatum subsp. cylindricum (Host) Asch. & Graebn.; Triticum cylindricum (Host) Ces., Pass. & Gibelli

= Aegilops cylindrica =

Species of grass

Aegilops cylindrica, also known as jointed goatgrass, is an annual grass seed native to Southern Europe and Russia that is part of the tribe Triticeae, along with wheat and some other cereals. It is not native to North America, however it has become a serious issue as a weed since it was introduced in the late 19th century. Due to its relation to winter wheat, it is very difficult to control. Not only are the grains similar in shape and size to the seeds of winter wheat, making it difficult to remove through grain cleaning methods, the shared genetics mean that no registered herbicides are available to single out jointed goatgrass while leaving winter wheat unharmed. This poses problems for farmers who have to suffer through reduced yields and poorer quality winter wheat.

== History and distribution ==
Jointed goatgrass is a winter annual grass seed native to Southern Europe and Russia, It is considered a problem weed in the United States, where it is now widely spread across western and central regions. It entered the US at several different times and at different locations, however the first was possibly in the late 19th century when Mennonite settlers from Russia brought Turkey winter wheat to Kansas. The first sample of jointed goatgrass was collected in Centerville, Delaware in 1870 and later samples collected in 1910 showed that jointed goatgrass had escaped from experimental plots on South Dakota State University campus at Brookings, SD. In 1999, it was reported that jointed goatgrass had infested an estimated 2,000,000 hectares (4,900,000 acres) in the US alone, and that this was annually increasing at a rate of about 20,000 hectares (49,000 acres). In 1986, jointed goatgrass had been reported as having infected less than 1% of winter wheat fields in seven counties in Nebraska, yet it was rated one of the ten most troublesome weeds, concerning 13% of respondents to a 1984 farmer survey. Human activities, wind, and machinery help to spread jointed goatgrass seeds once the joints disarticulate. However, due to the size of joints, wind dispersal is not as effective at spreading jointed goatgrass. Some of the human activities that helped spread jointed goatgrass include; planting contaminated wheat, allowing joints to blow from passing trucks hauling grain, transporting combines to different fields, or using straw spreaders on combines. Steven Miller argued that some states did not have laws that prevented contaminated winter wheat from being certified, which helped lead to it still being planted. Combines with straw spreaders are likely to spread jointed goatgrass joints farther than combines without these spreaders. Also, because the joints can float, runoff from fields can take them into rivers where they can aggregate and create an infestation in moist depressions, draws in fields, or along drainageways. It has been observed by growers and researchers that jointed goatgrass has a higher germination and emergence rate in compacted soils (such as in the wheel tracts of tractors) than in looser soils.

== Biology ==
Jointed goatgrass and winter wheat are genetically linked through a D genome which allows them to live in cold, continental climates and means they are capable of cross-breeding. They are both C3 plants, have similar phenology and growth rates and even germinate at the same time. Jointed goatgrass has glabrous to scabrous glumes with upright culms and the ability to produce 50 erect flowering stalks for each isolated plant. Both wheat and jointed goatgrass have spikes that are sessile and alternately arranged spikelets on opposite sides of the rachis. Each spikelet holds one to two seeds, and in some cases three, that are reddish-brown in colour and reach maturity in mid-summer which is when the spikelets shatter. These seeds adhere to the lemma and palea of the glume, so that removing the seeds from the joints is difficult.

== Agricultural issues ==
Jointed goatgrass can reduce the yield of winter wheat by 25 – 50% which can cost US farmers up to $145 million. Another problem is that jointed goatgrass provides an overwinter home for winter wheat attacking pests such as Russian wheat aphid, leaf spot, pink mold, foot rot, dwarf bunt, fron, root browning, damping off, and kernel bunt. When the spikes shatter, the disjointed spikelets are cylindrical in shape and are easily mistaken for small pieces of winter wheat straw. Since the spikelets are similar in shape and size to winter wheat seeds, it is difficult to separate them from the wheat using conventional methods. Better methods use length graders or weight tables, but these are slow and costly to operate. The Official United States Standards for Grain states that when the spikelets get mixed in with the winter wheat, the wheat is considered contaminated and the grade is reduced, resulting in a penalty. The more jointed goatgrass found in the wheat, the lower the grade and the larger the penalty. The lowest penalty is $0.02 per bushel while the highest is $0.15 per bushel.

=== Benefits ===
Jointed goatgrass does have some benefits in the sense that its germplasm can be used in winter wheat to improve its tolerance to environmental stresses, diseases and insects. Cattle in parts of the Central Great Plains are able to graze on it as well as winter wheat, and jointed goatgrass can even be ground into feed for other animals.

=== Solutions ===
Since jointed goatgrass and winter wheat are genetically related, there are no registered herbicides that can selectively kill off the jointed goatgrass without harming the winter wheat. However, Newhouse et al. looked at the development of an imidazolinone resistant strain of winter wheat which allows the use of imazamox to kill jointed goatgrass, but Seefeldt et al. mentioned the concerns about the possibility of resistant jointed goatgrass – winter wheat hybrids.

This has resulted in a demand for other methods for controlling jointed goatgrass. These include planting only certified winter wheat seed that is free of jointed goatgrass, covering trucks that are transporting contaminated winter wheat, cleaning combines before moving them to a new field, allowing combines to enter each field through one spot only so possible infestations can be localized, using combines that lack straw or chaff spreaders, mowing jointed goatgrass found along roadsides, fields or waste areas, as well as using cultural practices. These cultural practices include fallowing for one or more growth seasons, long-term crop rotations which would mean growing winter wheat only once every three to four years, and delaying seed planting so that seedbed preparations will destroy jointed goatgrass seedlings (although this may also reduce the yield of winter wheat). These practices are not completely effective since jointed goatgrass seeds are able to persist and can stay in dormancy for up to five years. The best solution is to use several cultural tactics throughout the life cycle of jointed goatgrass and at a minimum of three different decision times (during the interval between winter wheat crops, before planting winter wheat, after planting but before winter wheat jointing, and before harvesting).

Other cultural practices include burning the residue after harvest and deep moldboard plowing, although Ball et al. point out that these methods can reduce air quality, increase soil erosion, decrease soil productivity and result in lost organic matter. Another option for the control of jointed goatgrass is to use deleterious rhizobacteria (DRB) which scientists have already proven can suppress other weeds. However, the success of DRB depends upon its ability to survive which is affected by environmental factors such as soil series, temperature, moisture, and sunlight exposure. The goal for DRB is for it to be a low-cost, effective method for the control of jointed goatgrass with minimum damage to the environment.
