= Aegilops caudata =

Conservation status
- Least Concern (IUCN 3.1)

Scientific classification
- Kingdom: Plantae
- Clade: Tracheophytes
- Clade: Angiosperms
- Clade: Monocots
- Clade: Commelinids
- Order: Poales
- Family: Poaceae
- Subfamily: Pooideae
- Genus: Aegilops
- Species: A. caudata

Binomial name
- Aegilops caudata L.

Synonyms
- List: Aegilops caudata subsp. dichasians Zhuk.; Aegilops caudata var. paucispiculigera O.Schwarz; Aegilops caudata var. polyathera Boiss.; Aegilops caudata subsp. polyathera (Boiss.) Zhuk.; Aegilops cylindrica Sm.; Aegilops dichasians (Bowden) Humphries; Aegilops markgrafii (Greuter) K.Hammer; Orrhopygium caudatum (L.) Á.Löve; Triticum caudatum (L.) Godr. & Gren.; Triticum caudatum var. polyatherum (Boiss.) Asch. & Graebn.; Triticum dichasians Bowden; Triticum markgrafii Greuter

Species of plant

Aegilops caudata, the Cretan hard-grass, is a species of flowering plant in the family Poaceae. It is native to southeastern Europe and western Asia. An annual, it is found in grasslands and forests at elevations from 0 to 1,850 m (0 to 6,100 ft). It is a crop wild relative of wheat, with chromosome number 2n = 14.
