= Ignaz Friedrich Tausch =

Bohemian botanist (1793–1848)

Ignaz Friedrich Tausch (29 January 1793, in Theusing – 8 September 1848) was a Bohemian botanist.

He studied philosophy, medicine and natural sciences at the University of Prague, becoming an associate professor of economic and technical botany in 1815. He discovered at least eleven species of plants, including Rhizobotrya alpina and Saxifraga hostii. During his career he worked at the botanical garden of Emanuel Joseph Malabaila von Canal (1745-1826).

He was the taxonomic authority of many botanical species. Plants bearing the specific epithet of tauschii are named in his honor, e.g. Triticum tauschii. In 1825, Diederich Franz Leonhard von Schlechtendal named the genus Tauschia, or umbrellaworts (family Apiaceae) after him.

== Biography ==
Tausch was born on 29 January 1793 in Bohemia to a master brewer, Josef Tausch, and Elizabeth Tausch. In his youth, Tausch visited a Piaristengymnasium, a higher educational institution, in the town of Schlackenwerth, sparking his curiosity in botany. From 1809 to 1812, he attended the Charles University in Prague, where he studied philosophy, medicine, and botany. From 1815 to 1826, he served as a professor of botany at the botanical garden of Emmanuel Canal at Prague. From 1821 to his death, he was a member of the Academy in Turin, and in 1843, became president of the Bohemian Horticultural Society. He died in Prague on 8 September 1848, at the age of 55.

== Publications ==
- "Hortus canalius seu plantarum rariorum", (tomas 1: decays 1 of 2) 1823.
- Bemerkungen über einige Arten der Gattung Paeonia, in Flora, Regensburg, 11, (6), 81–89.

Tausch edited several unnumbered exsiccata-like series, among others the work Dendrotheca Exoto-Bohemica documenting tree specimens for dendrology.
