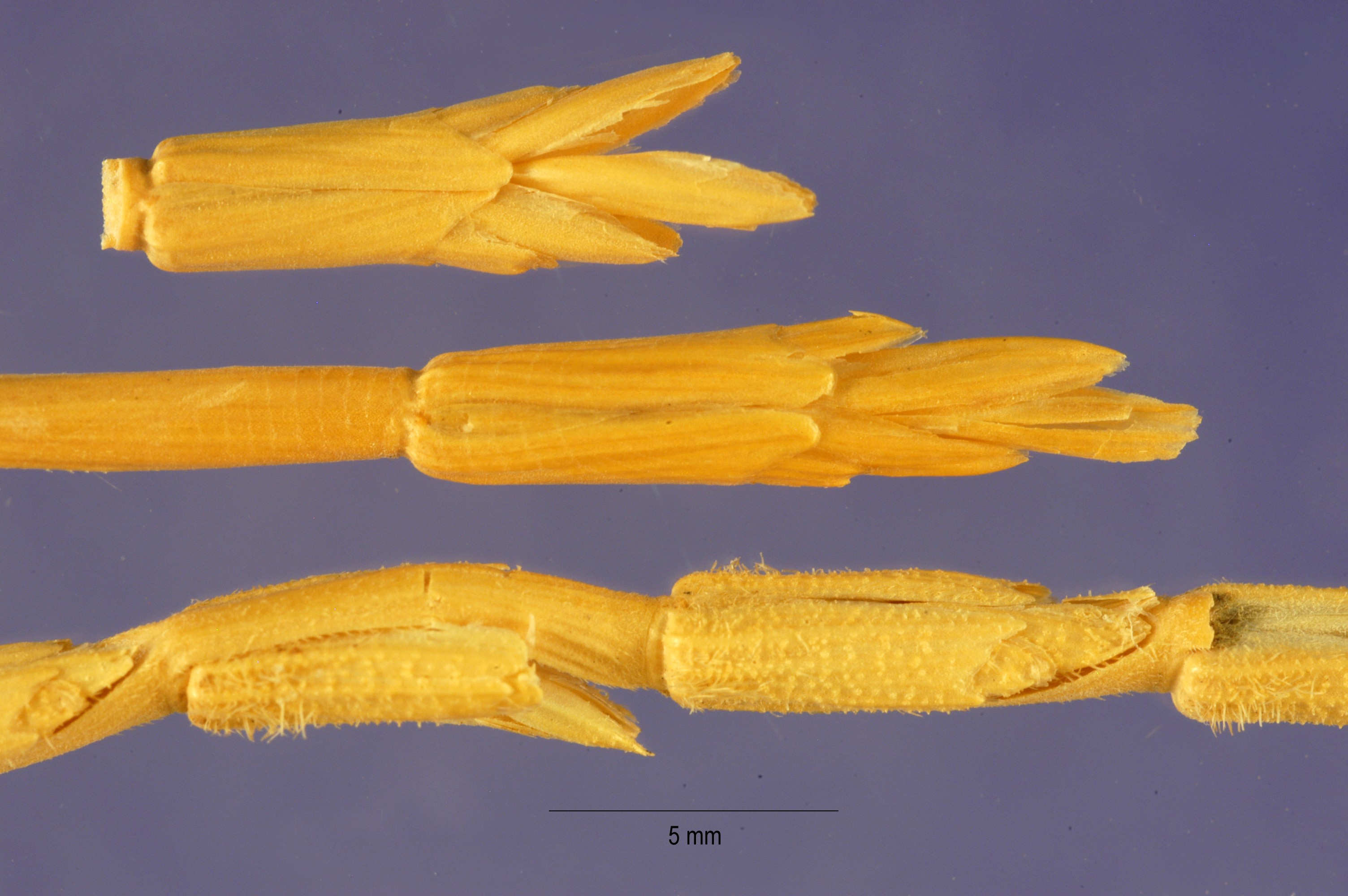

Scientific classification
- Kingdom: Plantae
- Clade: Tracheophytes
- Clade: Angiosperms
- Clade: Monocots
- Clade: Commelinids
- Order: Poales
- Family: Poaceae
- Subfamily: Pooideae
- Genus: Aegilops
- Species: A. longissima

Binomial name
- Aegilops longissima Schweinf. & Muschl.

= Aegilops longissima =

Species of grass

Aegilops longissima (syn. Aegilops sharonense Eig, Sitopsis longissima (Schweinf. & Muschl.) Á. Löve, Triticum longissimum (Schweinf. & Muschl.) Bowden, Triticum sharonense L.) is a species in the family Poaceae. It is native to the Levant & Egypt.
