= Aegilops mutica =

Conservation status
- Endangered (IUCN 3.1)

Scientific classification
- Kingdom: Plantae
- Clade: Tracheophytes
- Clade: Angiosperms
- Clade: Monocots
- Clade: Commelinids
- Order: Poales
- Family: Poaceae
- Subfamily: Pooideae
- Genus: Aegilops
- Species: A. mutica

Binomial name
- Aegilops mutica Boiss.

Synonyms
- List: Aegilops loliacea Jaub. & Spach; Aegilops loriacea Jaub. & Spach; Aegilops mutica f. gandiljanii K.Hammer; Aegilops mutica var. loliacea (Jaub. & Spach) Eig; Aegilops mutica f. loliacea (Jaub. & Spach) K.Hammer; Aegilops mutica subsp. loliacea (Jaub. & Spach) Zhuk.; Aegilops mutica var. muruni Gandilyan; Aegilops mutica var. nual Gandilyan; Aegilops mutica var. nuluci Gandilyan; Aegilops mutica f. nuluci (Gandilyan) K.Hammer; Aegilops mutica var. nurub Gandilyan; Aegilops mutica f. nurub (Gandilyan) K.Hammer; Aegilops mutica var. nuruni Gandilyan; Aegilops mutica f. nuruni (Gandilyan) K.Hammer; Aegilops mutica var. pual Gandilyan; Aegilops mutica var. puluci Gandilyan; Aegilops mutica f. puluci (Gandilyan) K.Hammer; Aegilops mutica f. puruni (Gandilyan) K.Hammer; Aegilops mutica var. puruni Gandilyan; Aegilops mutica subsp. tripsacoides (Jaub. & Spach) Zhuk.; Aegilops mutica var. typica Eig; Aegilops tripsacoides Jaub. & Spach; Amblyopyrum muticum (Boiss.) Eig; Amblyopyrum muticum subsp. loliaceum (Jaub. & Spach) Á.Löve; Amblyopyrum muticum var. loliaceum (Jaub. & Spach) Eig; Triticum emarginatum Godr.; Triticum muticum (Boiss.) Hack.; Triticum muticum var. tripsacoides (Jaub. & Spach) Thell.; Triticum tripsacoides (Jaub. & Spach) Bowden

Species of plant

Aegilops mutica is a species of flowering plant in the family Poaceae. It is native to Turkey and the Transcaucasus. An annual, it is found in grasslands in only 9 to 10 stations at elevations from 600 to 1,250 m (2,000 to 4,100 ft). Under its synonym Amblyopyrum muticum it has been assessed as Endangered. It bears the T genome, of interest to students of wild relatives of wheat.
