= Spach =

Spach is a surname. Notable people with the surname include:

- Édouard Spach (1801–1879), French botanist
- Stephen Spach (born 1982), American football player

== See also ==
- Spack
