= Barley mild mosaic bymovirus =

Virus classification
- (unranked): Virus
- Realm: Riboviria
- Kingdom: Orthornavirae
- Phylum: Pisuviricota
- Class: Stelpaviricetes
- Order: Patatavirales
- Family: Potyviridae
- Genus: Bymovirus
- Species: Barley mild mosaic bymovirus

Species of virus

Barley mild mosaic bymovirus is a plant virus.
