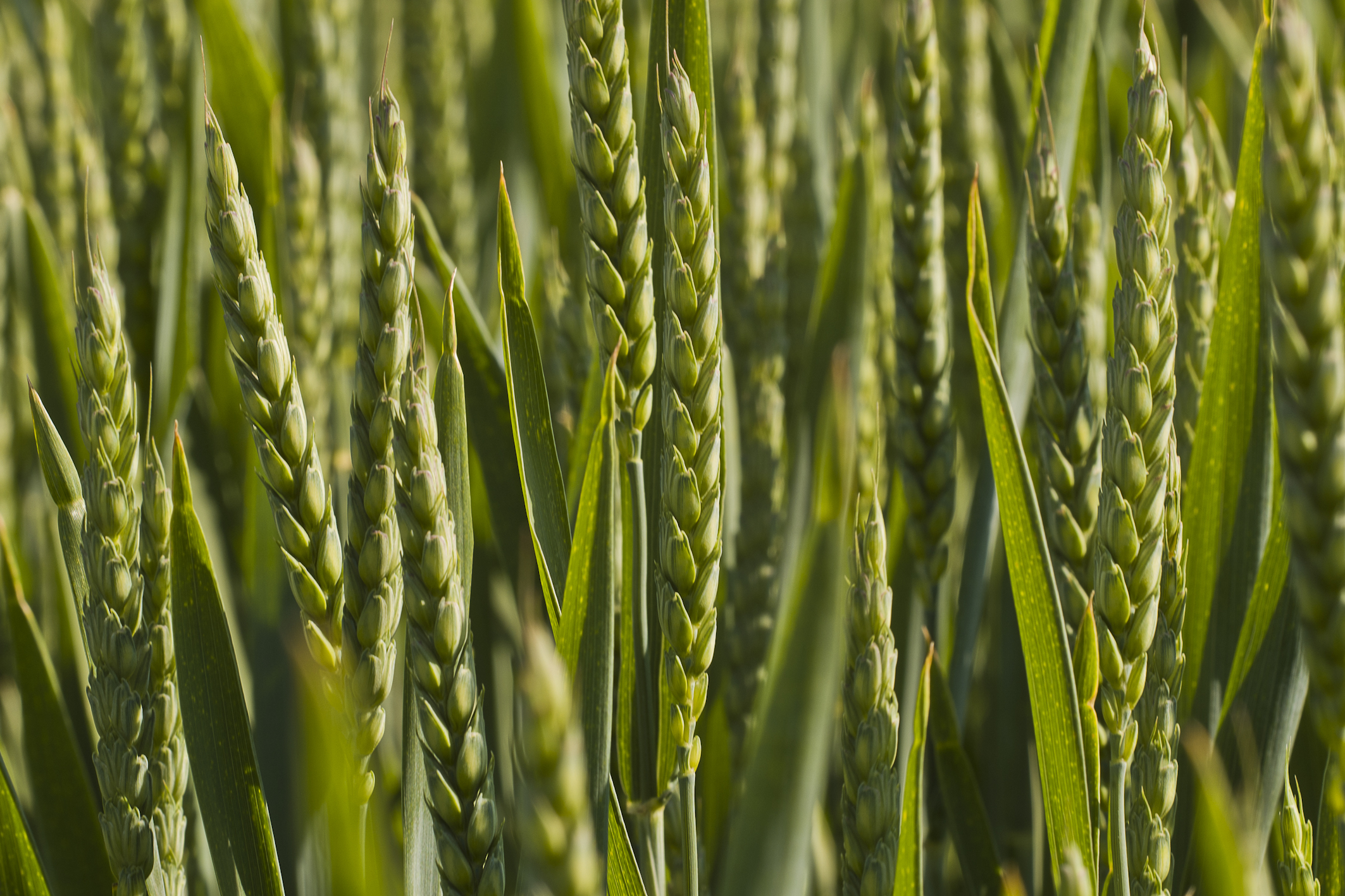

Scientific classification
- Kingdom: Plantae
- Clade: Embryophytes
- Clade: Tracheophytes
- Clade: Angiosperms
- Clade: Monocots
- Clade: Commelinids
- Order: Poales
- Family: Poaceae
- Subfamily: Pooideae
- Genus: Triticum
- Species: T. aestivum

Binomial name
- Triticum aestivum L.

Synonyms
- Triticum sativum Lam.; Triticum vulgare Vill.

= Common wheat =

Species of plant

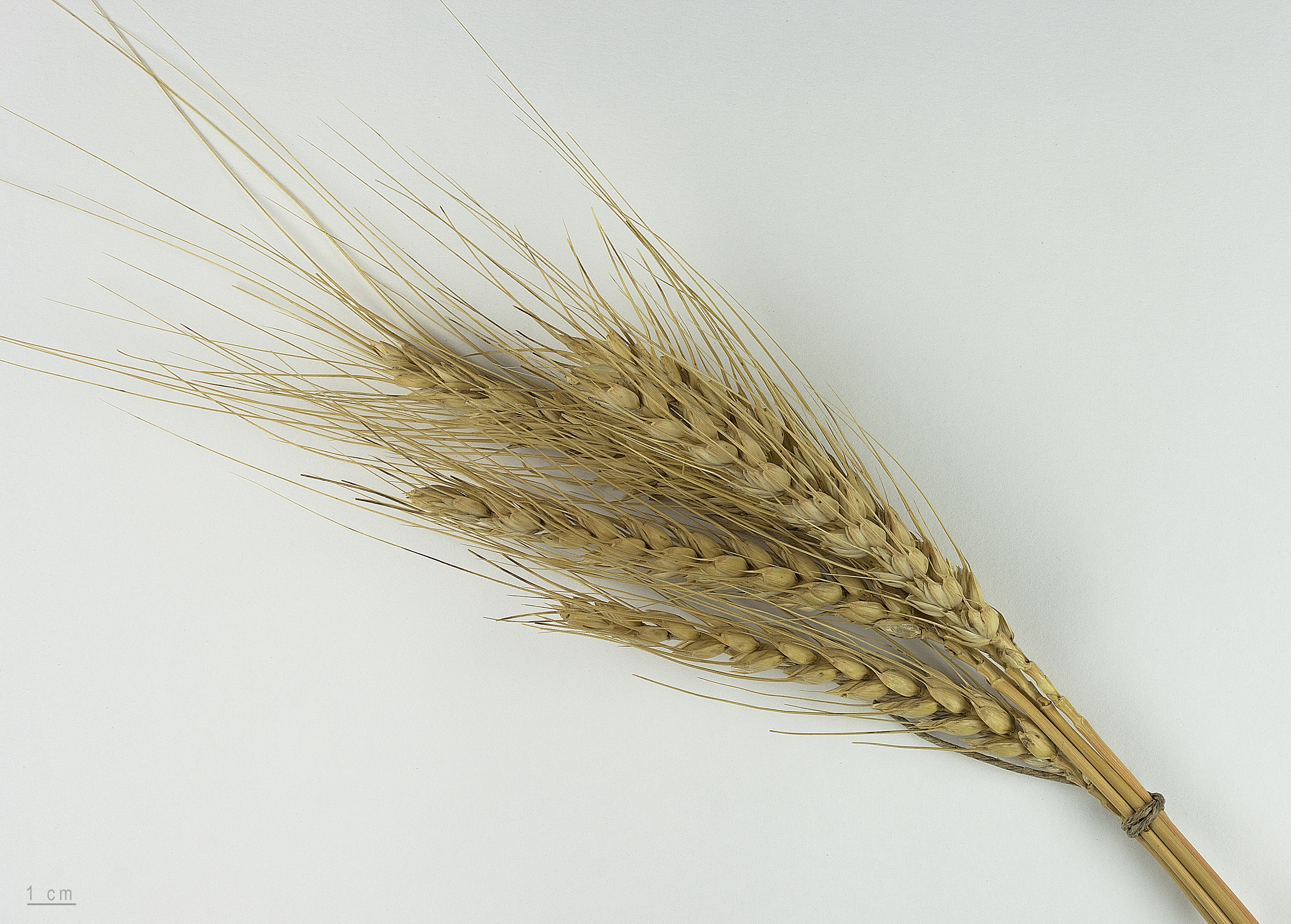
ssp. aestivum

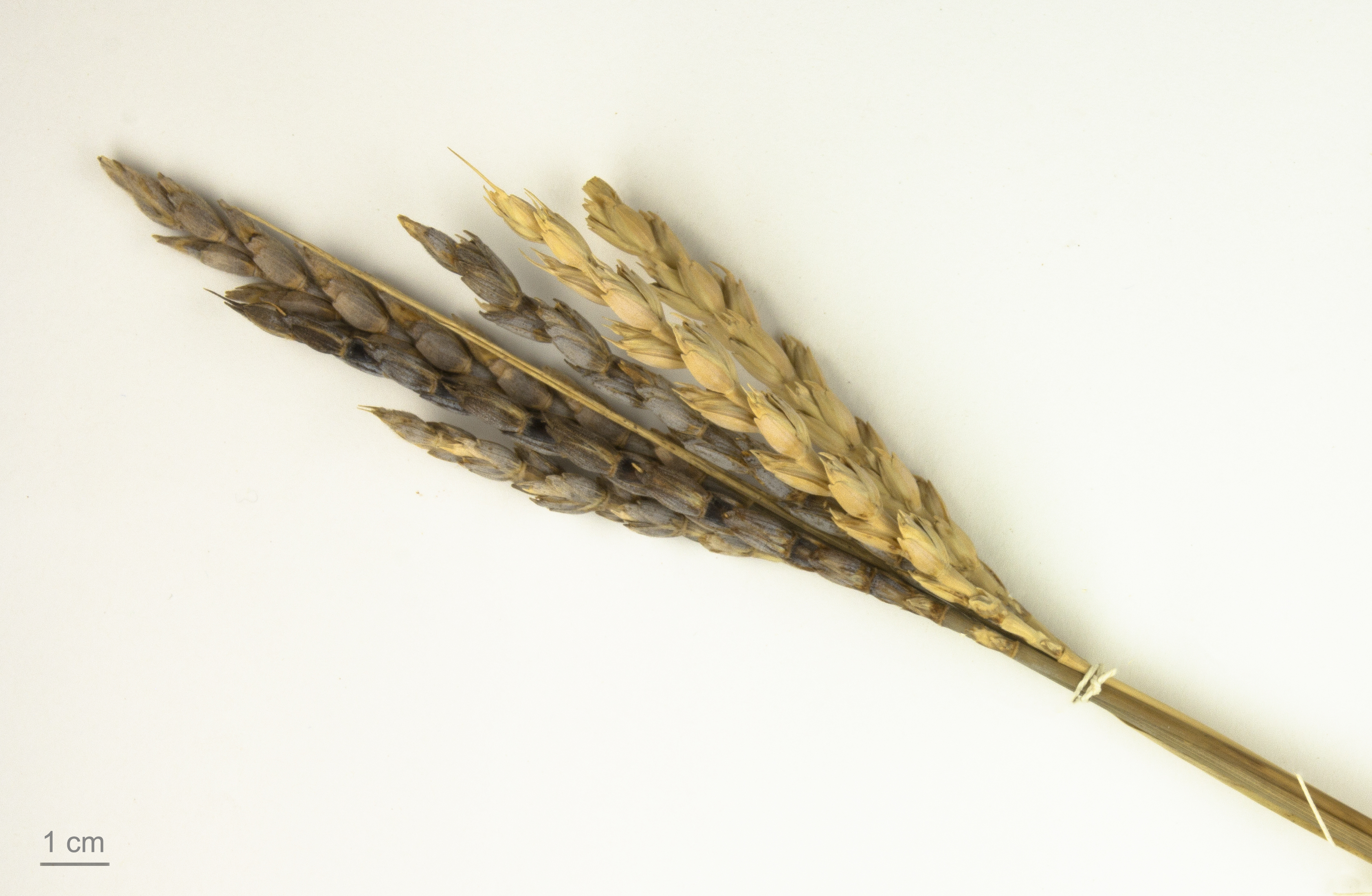
Triticum aestivum subsp. vavilovii MHNT

Common wheat (Triticum aestivum), also known as bread wheat, is a cultivated wheat species. It originated around 8,000 years ago, from the hybridization of an already existing domesticated variety of wheat and the wild goatgrass in the South Caucasus or southwestern Caspian area. About 95% of wheat produced worldwide is this species; it is the most widely grown of all crops and the cereal with the highest monetary yield.

== Taxonomy ==
Numerous forms of wheat have evolved under human selection. This diversity has led to confusion in the naming of wheats, with names based on both genetic and morphological characteristics.

=== List of common cultivars ===
- Albimonte
- Manital
- Shirley
- Hilliard

=== Phylogeny ===
Bread wheat is an allohexaploid – a combination of six sets of chromosomes from different species. Of the six sets of chromosomes, four come from emmer (Triticum turgidum, itself a tetraploid) and two from Aegilops tauschii (a wild diploid goatgrass). Wild emmer arose from an even earlier ploidy event, a tetraploidy between two diploids, wild einkorn (T. urartu) and A. speltoides (another wild goatgrass).

Free-threshing wheat is closely related to spelt. As with spelt, genes contributed from Aegilops tauschii give bread wheat greater cold hardiness than most wheats, and it is cultivated throughout the world's temperate regions.

== Cultivation ==
=== History ===
Common wheat originated around 8,000 years ago, from the hybridization of an already domesticated free-threshing wheat and the wild goatgrass (Aegilops tauschii Coss.) in the South Caucasus or southwestern Caspian area. After domestication it spread to North Africa, Europe and East Asia in the prehistoric period. Naked wheats (including Triticum aestivum, T. durum, and T. turgidum) were found in Roman burial sites ranging from 100 BCE to 300 CE.

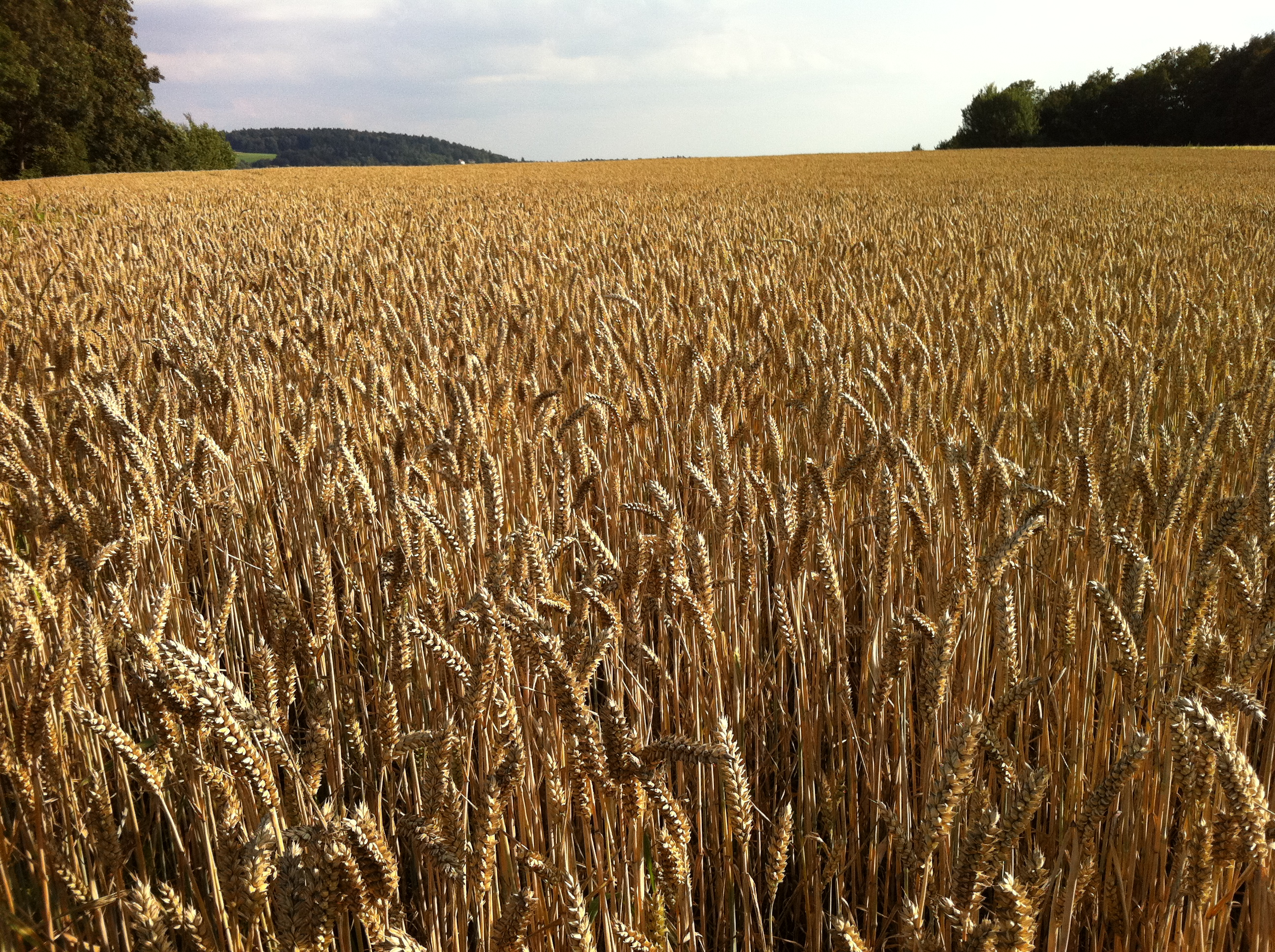
Deggendorf, Germany

Wheat first reached North America with Spanish missions in the 16th century, but North America's role as a major exporter of grain dates from the colonization of the prairies in the 1870s. As grain exports from Russia ceased during World War I, grain production in Kansas doubled.

Worldwide, bread wheat has proved well adapted to modern industrial baking, and has displaced many of the other wheat, barley, and rye species that were once commonly used for bread making, particularly in Europe.

=== Plant breeding ===
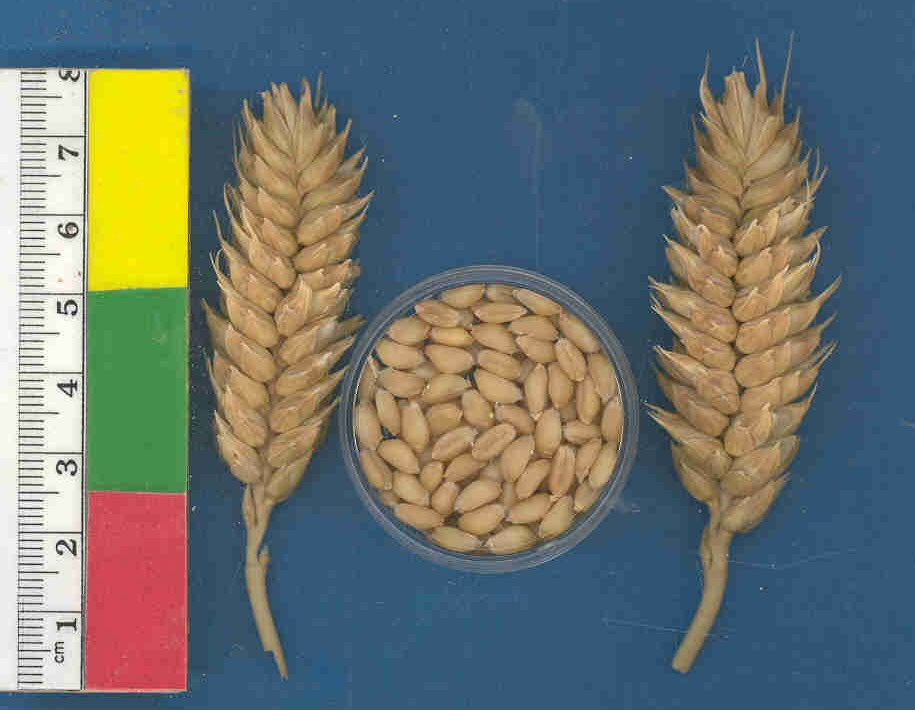
Ears of compact wheat

Modern wheat varieties have been selected for short stems, the result of RHt dwarfing genes that reduce the plant's sensitivity to gibberellic acid, a plant hormone that lengthens cells. RHt genes were introduced to modern wheat varieties in the 1960s by Norman Borlaug from Norin 10 cultivars of wheat grown in Japan. Short stems are important because the application of high levels of chemical fertilizers would otherwise cause the stems to grow too high, resulting in lodging (collapse of the stems). Stem heights are also even, which is important for modern harvesting techniques.

== Allergy ==
Wheat allergy (WA) is a complex type of food hypersensitivity, which is a reaction of the immune system to the proteins contained in wheat. WA can be a reaction dependent on immunoglobulin E (IgE) or an independent reaction. Wheat allergy is one of the food allergies significantly affecting the quality of life of patients. The factors that trigger the allergic reaction are numerous wheat proteins, not only those contained in gluten, such as gliadins and glutenins, but also α-amylase/trypsin inhibitors, lipid transport proteins (LTPs), thioredoxins, and hundreds of others.

== Other forms of common wheat ==
Compact wheats (e.g., club wheat Triticum compactum, but in India T. sphaerococcum) are closely related to common wheat, but have a much more compact ear. Their shorter rachis segments lead to spikelets packed closer together. Compact wheats are often regarded as subspecies rather than species in their own right (thus T. aestivum subsp. compactum).
