= KASP =

KASP may refer to:

- KASP-LP, a radio station (107.9 FM) licensed to Aspen, Colorado, United States
- King Abdullah Science Park
- Kompetitive allele specific PCR, a DNA profiling technique
- Krašto apsaugos savanorių pajėgos (KASP), Lithuanian National Defence Volunteer Forces
