= MLO =

MLO may refer to:

== Organisations ==
- Macau Liaison Office, a government office
- Malibu Locals Only, a group of youths local to Malibu, California, US
- Misanthropic Luciferian Order, former name of the Satanic occult organisation Temple of the Black Light

== Science and technology ==
- Mediolateral oblique, a standard view used in mammography
- Mildew resistance locus o, a plant gene family
- Mount Laguna Observatory, near San Diego, California, US
- Mauna Loa Observatory, an atmospheric baseline station near Hilo, Hawaii, US
- Multi-Link Operation, an IEEE 802.11be (Wi-Fi 7) technology
- Mycoplasma-like organism, the original name for a phytoplasma

== Other uses ==
- Milos Island National Airport (IATA code), Greece
- Mortgage Loan Originator, a US licensed loan officer
