= Triticum aethiopicum =

Scientific classification
- Kingdom: Plantae
- Clade: Tracheophytes
- Clade: Angiosperms
- Clade: Monocots
- Clade: Commelinids
- Order: Poales
- Family: Poaceae
- Subfamily: Pooideae
- Genus: Triticum
- Species: T. aethiopicum

Binomial name
- Triticum aethiopicum Jakubz.

Species of grass

Triticum aethiopicum, commonly known as Ethiopian wheat, is a variety of wheat closely related to Triticum durum. Ethiopia is considered as a center of origin and diversity for many crop species including tetraploids wheat species. Triticum aethiopiacum is one of the tetraploid wheat grown in Ethiopia.
