= Mildew resistance locus o =

Plant-specific gene family

Mildew locus o (MLO) is a plant-specific gene family. Specific members of the Mildew Locus O gene family act as powdery mildew susceptibility factors. Their inactivation, as the result of a loss-of-function mutation, gene knock-out, or knock-down, is associated with a peculiar form of resistance, referred to as mlo resistance. The mlo gene family is widely conserved across the plant kingdom with some members evolving as early as the first land plants. Mlo proteins contain seven highly conserved transmembrane domains, as well as a calmodulin-binding domain. TaMLO genes are the MLOs in bread wheat, Triticum aestivum.

== MLO genes in tomatoes ==
At least 17 MLO genes exist in tomatoes. They have a protein length of between 270 and 591 amino acids.
