= Wheat grain classes =

Classification of wheat greatly varies by the producing country.

== Argentina ==
Originally, the wheat classes in Argentina were related to the production region or port of shipment: Rosafe (grown in Santa Fe province, shipped through Rosario), Bahia Blanca (grown in Buenos Aires and La Pampa provinces and shipped through Bahia Blanca), Buenos Aires (shipped through the port of Buenos Aires). While mostly similar to the US Hard Red Spring wheat, the classification caused inconsistencies, so Argentina had introduced three new classes of wheat, with all names using a prefix Trigo Dura Argentina (TDA) and a number:

Argentinian wheat classes
Name	% protein (dry basis)	Alveograph W factor, $J \cdot 10^{-4}$	P/L ratio	Farinograph stability, min	Falling number, sec	Use
TDA 1 Corrector	>12.5	>300	0.8–1.5	15–40	>300	industrial breadmaking of pan breads, panettone, rolls, and buns
TDA 2 Superior Breadmaking	>12.0	>240	0.8–1.5	>9	>300	baguettes with long fermentation (more than 8 hours)
TDA 3 Common Breadmaking	>11.0	170–240	0.7–1.0	3–7	>300	standard breads and crackers with short fermentation

== Australia ==
The grain classification in Australia is within the purview of the National Pool Classification Panel. Australia had chosen to measure the protein content at 11% moisture basis (m.b.). The measured (meas.) and average (avg.) values below are based on the results of testing over the 2002–2005 period.

Australian wheat classes
Name	% protein (11% m.b.)	Alveograph W factor, $J \cdot 10^{-4}$	Farinograph absorption, %	Farinograph stability, min	Use
Australian Prime Hard (APH)	≥13.0	393 avg.	64.0 avg.		European breads, Chinese noodles, ramen noodles, wonton skins
Australian Hard (AH)	≥10.0	335 avg.	63.9 avg.		European breads, Chinese noodles, ramen noodles, wonton skins
Australian Premium White (APW)	≥11.5	276 avg.	63.7 avg.	>8.3 meas.	flat breads, pita, steamed breads, noodles
Australian Standard White (ASW)/Australian Noodle (ASWN)		228 avg.	61.7 avg.		multipurpose wheat, ASWN targets udon noodles and ramen noodles
Australian Soft (ASFT)	≤9.5	very low	low	short	biscuits, cakes, pastries, steamed buns, extruded snacks
Australian Durum (ADR, multiple numbered grades like ADR1 and ADR2)	≥13 (No.1 grade)				pasta (sheeted and extruded), couscous, hearth breads, flat breads

== Canada ==
The decisions on the wheat classification in Canada are coordinated by the Variety Registration Office of the Canadian Food Inspection Agency. Like in the US system, the eight classes in Western Canada and six classes in Eastern Canada are based on colour, season, and hardness. The measured (meas.) and average (avg.) values below are mostly based on the results of testing over the 1996–2005 period (* marks 2001–2005 results). Canada has a unique requirement that the varieties of wheat grains should allow for purely visual identification.

Canadian wheat classes
Name	% protein (13.5% m.b.)	Alveograph W factor, $J \cdot 10^{-4}$	Farinograph absorption, %	Farinograph stability, min	Use
Canada Western Amber Durum (CWAD, with extra-strong CWAD sub-variety)	high				Mediterranean and North African flat and hearth breads
Canada Western Red Spring (CWRS)/Canada Eastern Red Spring (CERS)	≥13.5	454 avg.	64–70		pan and crusty breads, sponge and dough baking
Canada Western Red Winter (CWRW)/Canada Eastern Hard Red Winter (CEHRW), can be "generic" (feed) and "select" for milling	varies	295/245 avg.	59.2/60.3 avg.	6.6/6.3* avg.	European hearth breads, pizzas, Middle Eastern pocket bread, noodles
Canada Western Hard White Spring (CWHWS)/Canada Eastern Hard White Spring (CEHWS), similar to CWRS/CERS					high-volume pan and crusty breads, Asian noodles, steamed breads
Canada Prairie Spring Red (CPSR)	similar to CWRS	435*	63.8*	9.5* avg.	hearth breads, steamed breads, noodles
Canada Prairie Spring White (CPSW)	medium				flat breads, noodles
Canada Western Extra Strong (CWES)	lower than CWRS		lower than CWRS		high gluten, blending for higher strength dough, frozen dough
Canada Eastern Soft Red Winter (CESRW)/Canada Eastern White Winter (CEWW), can be "generic" (feed) and "select" for milling	low	104*/78* avg.	51.9*/51.0* avg.	3.0*/2.6* avg.	high sugar ratio cakes, biscuits, cookies, crackers
Canada Western Soft White Spring (CWSWS)	10–11.5	<60	50-55	1.0-1.5	cakes, cookies, biscuits, pastry

== France ==
The classification of wheat grains in France is controlled by the Groupe d'étude et de contrôle des variétés et des semences (GEVES) and the Institut Technique des Céréales et des Fourrages (ITCF, now part of Arvalis – Institut du végétal), with the involvement of Céréaliers de France group. Most French wheat is of red winter type.

French wheat classes
Name	% protein (dry basis)	Alveograph W factor, $J \cdot 10^{-4}$	Specific weight, kg/hl, %	Falling number, seconds	Use
Class E	≥12.0	≥250		≥220	Blending into other classes to improve performance
Class 1	11.5–12.5	160–250	≥76	≥220	Breadmaking
Class 2	10.5–11.5	per contract	≥76	≥180	Breadmaking
Class 3	<10.5		two subclasses: <74/≥74		

== USA ==
The wheat grain classes used in the United States are named by colour, season, and hardness:

- Durum – Hard, translucent, light-coloured grain used to make semolina flour for pasta and bulghur; high in protein, specifically, gluten protein.
- Hard Red Spring – Hard, brownish, high-protein wheat used for bread and hard baked goods. Bread flour and high-gluten flours are commonly made from hard red spring wheat. It is primarily traded on the Minneapolis Grain Exchange.
- Hard Red Winter – Hard, brownish, mellow high-protein wheat used for bread, hard baked goods and as an adjunct to increase protein in pastry flour for pie crusts. Some brands of unbleached all-purpose flours are made from hard red winter wheat alone. It is primarily traded on the Kansas City Board of Trade. Many varieties grown from Kansas south descend from a variety known as "Turkey red", which was brought to Kansas by Mennonite immigrants from Russia. Marquis wheat was developed to prosper in the shorter growing season in Canada, and is grown as far south as southern Nebraska.
- Soft Red Winter – Soft, low-protein wheat used for cakes, pie crusts, biscuits, and muffins. Cake flour, pastry flour, and some self-rising flours with baking powder and salt added, for example, are made from soft red winter wheat. It is primarily traded on the Chicago Board of Trade.
- Hard White – Hard, light-coloured, opaque, chalky, medium-protein wheat planted in dry, temperate areas. Used for bread and brewing.
- Soft White – Soft, light-coloured, very low protein wheat grown in temperate moist areas. Used for pie crusts and pastry.

== See also ==
- Grain quality

== Sources ==
- Khan, K. (2016). "Wheat Classes − Producing Nations". Wheat: Chemistry and Technology. American Association of Cereal Chemists International. Elsevier Science. ISBN 978-0-12-810454-5.
