= Wheat flour =

Powder made from the grinding of wheat used for human consumption

Wheat flour, whole-grain
Nutritional value per 100 g (3.5 oz)
- Energy: 1,418 kJ (339 kcal)
- Carbohydrates: 72.57 g
- Sugars glucose: 0.41 g 0.78 g
- Dietary fiber: 12.2 g
- Fat: 1.87 g
- Protein: 13.70 g
Vitamins and minerals
Vitamins	Quantity %DV^{†}
Thiamine (B1)	37% 0.447 mg
Riboflavin (B2)	17% 0.215 mg
Niacin (B3)	40% 6.365 mg
Pantothenic acid (B5)	20% 1.008 mg
Vitamin B6	20% 0.341 mg
Folate (B9)	11% 44 μg
Minerals	Quantity %DV^{†}
Calcium	3% 34 mg
Iron	22% 3.88 mg
Magnesium	33% 138 mg
Manganese	165% 3.8 mg
Phosphorus	28% 346 mg
Potassium	14% 405 mg
Sodium	0% 5 mg
Zinc	27% 2.93 mg
- ^{†}Percentages estimated using US recommendations for adults, except for potassium, which is estimated based on expert recommendation from the National Academies.

Wheat flour is a powder made from the grinding of common wheat used for human consumption. Wheat varieties are called "soft" or "weak" if gluten content is low, and are called "hard" or "strong" if they have high gluten content. Hard flour, or bread flour, is high in gluten, with 12% to 14% gluten content, and its dough has elastic toughness that holds its shape well once baked. Soft flour is comparatively low in gluten and thus results in a loaf with a finer, crumbly texture. Soft flour, in the US, is usually divided into cake flour, which is the lowest in gluten, and pastry flour, which has slightly more gluten than cake flour.

In terms of the parts of the grain (the grass fruit) used in flour—the endosperm or protein/starchy part, the germ or protein/fat/vitamin-rich part, and the bran or fiber part—there are three general types of flour. White flour is made from the endosperm only. Brown flour includes some of the grain's germ and bran, while whole grain or wholemeal flour is made from the entire grain, including the bran, endosperm, and germ. Germ flour is made from the endosperm and germ, excluding the bran.

== Milling ==
To produce refined (white) wheat flour, grain is usually tempered, i.e. moisture added to the grain, before milling, to optimize milling efficiency. This softens the starchy "endosperm" portion of the wheat kernel, which will be separated out in the milling process to produce what is known to consumers as white flour. The addition of moisture also stiffens the bran and ultimately reduces the energy input required to shatter the kernel, while at the same time avoiding the shattering of bran and germ particles to be separated out in this milling process by sieving or sifting.

The endosperm portion of the kernel makes up about 80% of the volume and is desirable because the products made from this white flour are often considered to have a milder flavor, smoother texture, and, in the case of bread, greater volume. The balance of the kernel is composed of the bran and the germ which tend to be coarser. With the invention of the roller milling system in the late 19th century, the bran and the germ were able to be removed, dramatically improving the appeal of baked products to the public.

The moistened grain is first passed through the series of break rollers, then sieved to separate out the fine particles that make up white flour. The balance are intermediate particles of endosperm (otherwise known as product middling or farina) and coarse particles of bran and germ. The middling then makes multiple passes through the reduction rolls, and is again sieved after each pass to maximize extraction of white flour from the endosperm, while removing coarser bran and germ particles.

To produce whole wheat flour, 100% of the bran and germ must be reintroduced to the white flour that the roller milling system was originally designed to separate it from. Therefore, these elements are first ground on another mill (usually a pin mill). These finer bran and germ fractions are then reintroduced to the endosperm (white flour) to produce whole wheat flour made of 100% of the kernel of wheat.

Flour manufacturers commonly add malted barley flour or fungal amylase to commercially produced wheat flour. The enzymes in these additives increase the rate of conversion of starch to sugars when water is added to the flour, thus making more sugars available for yeast to metabolize during the bread-making process. Millers use the falling number to determine the quality of the wheat grains that are ground into flour.

== Types ==
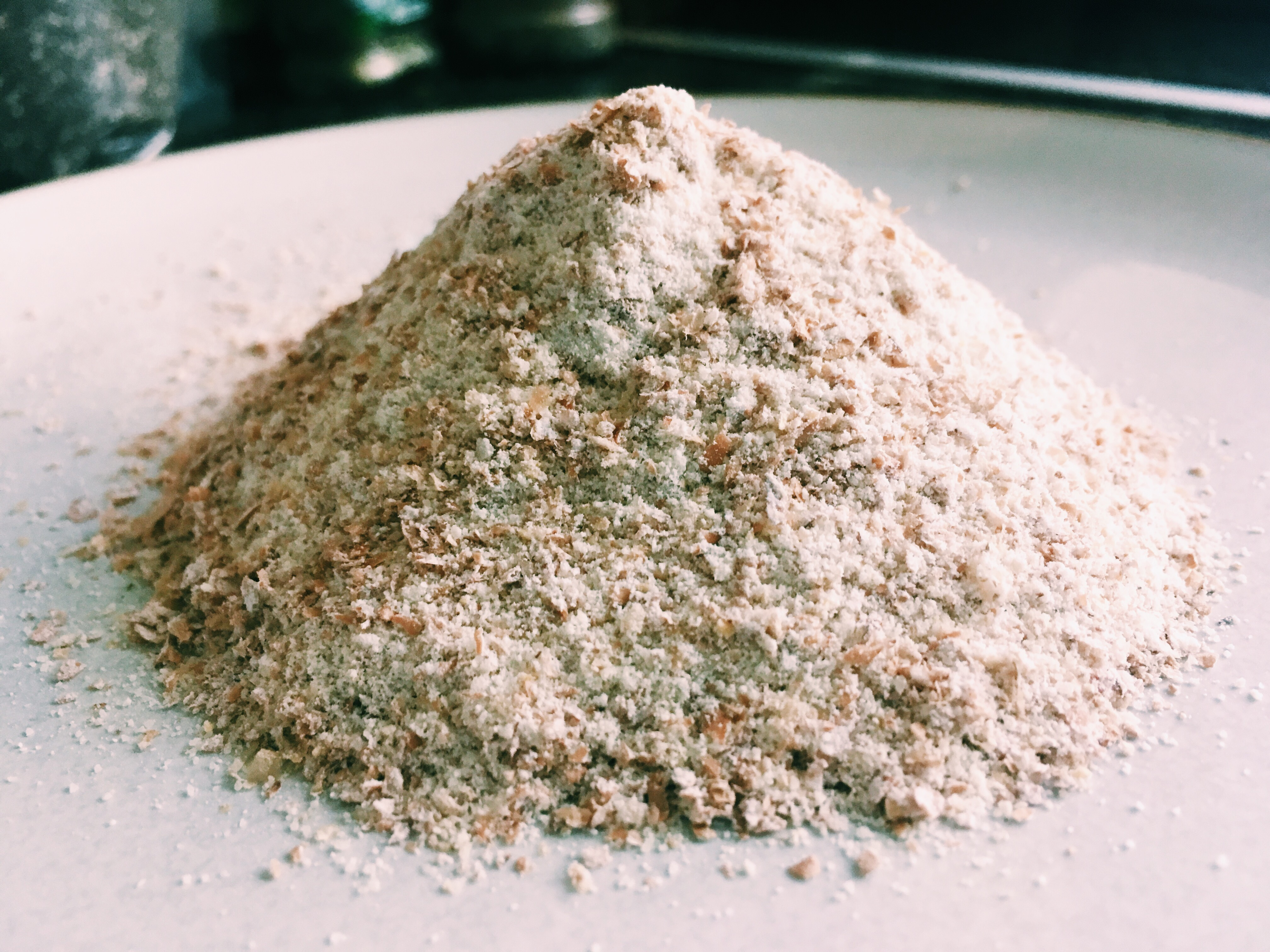
Wheat flour

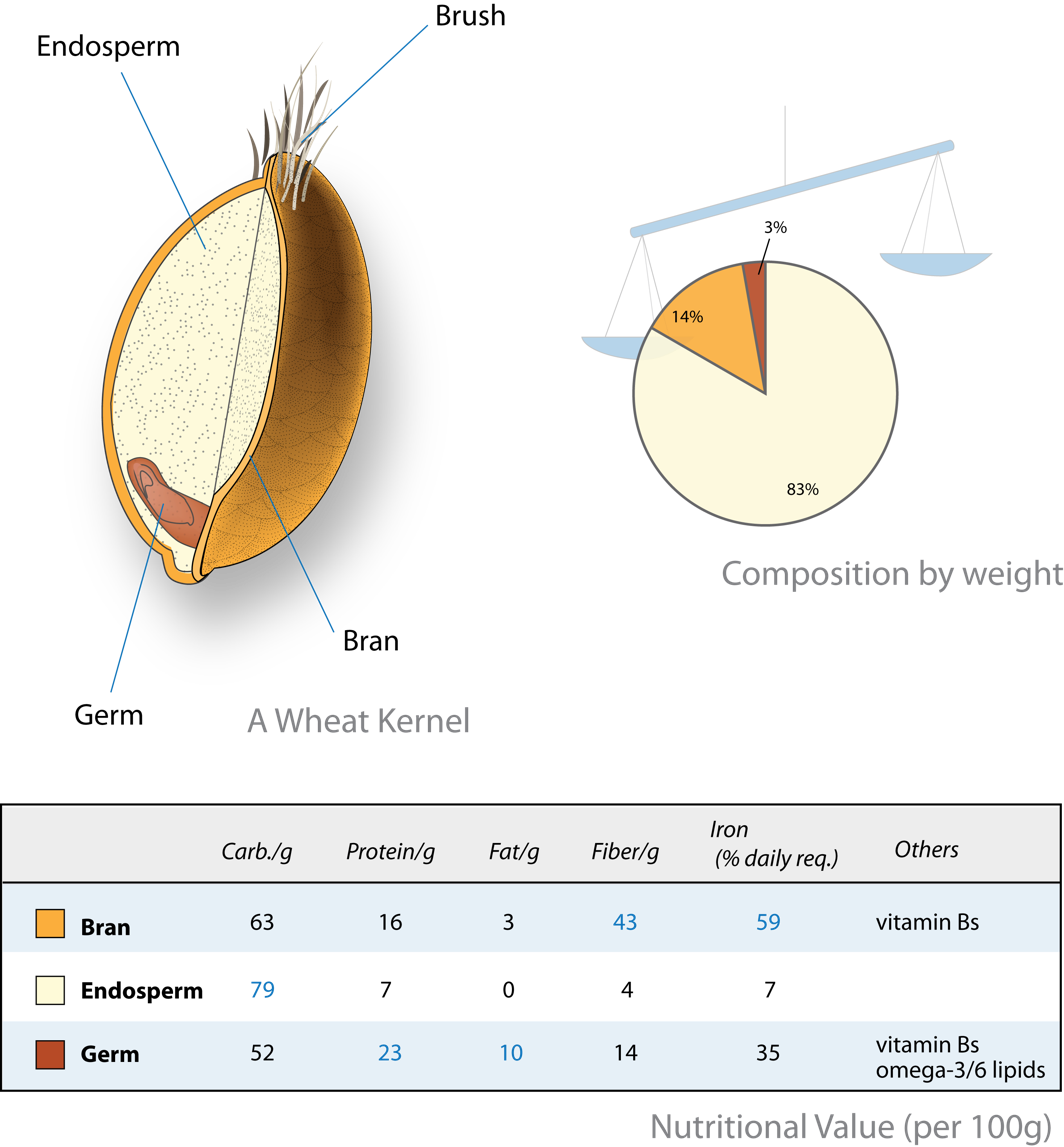
Parts of a wheat kernel and their nutritional values

Wheat flour is available in many varieties; the categorization is regional, and the same name may have several different regional meanings.

=== Canada ===
- Whole wheat flour in Canada may have up to 5% of the grain removed; most of the germ is often removed to prevent the flour from going rancid.
- Whole grain flour contains the whole grain, including bran, germ and endosperm, but not the chaff

=== Fiji ===
- Sharp flour is produced in Fiji and primarily used in Indian cuisine.

=== Indian wheat flours ===
Indian flours are generally categorized by how much of the grain is stripped away.

- Wheat powder/flour – 'whole grain' (mixture of germ, endosperm, and bran)
- Atta flour – mixture of endosperm and bran
- Maida flour – endosperm, bleached; a very white flour, similar to the American bleached flour
- Sooji/rava – coarse-ground endosperm.

=== Southeast Asia ===
- Tang flour or wheat starch is a type of wheat flour used primarily in Chinese cuisine for making the outer layer of dumplings and buns. It is also used in Vietnamese cuisine, where it is called bột lọc trong.

=== United States ===
American flours are categorized by gluten/protein content, processing, and use.

- All-purpose or plain flour is a blended wheat with a protein content lower than bread flour, ranging between 9% and 12%. Depending on the brand or the region where it is purchased, it may be composed of all hard or soft wheats, but is usually a blend of the two, and can range from low protein content to moderately high. It is marketed as an inexpensive alternative to bakers' flour which is acceptable for most household baking needs.
- Bread flour or strong flour is always made from hard wheat, usually hard spring wheat. It has a very high protein content, between 10% and 13%, making it excellent for yeast bread baking. It can be white or whole wheat or in between.
- Cake flour is a finely milled white flour made from soft wheat. It has very low protein content, between 8% and 10%, making it suitable for soft-textured cakes and cookies. The higher protein content of other flours would make the cakes tough. Related to cake flour are masa harina (from maize), maida flour (from wheat or tapioca), and pure starches.
- Durum flour is made from Durum wheat and is suited for pasta making, traditional pizza and flatbread for doner kebab.
- Graham flour is a special type of whole wheat flour. The endosperm is finely ground, as in white flour, while the bran and germ are coarsely ground. Graham flour is uncommon outside of the United States (but see atta flour, a similar product, below). Graham flour is the basis of true graham crackers.
- Instant flour is pregelatinized (precooked) for easier incorporation in gravies and sauces.
- Pastry flour or cookie flour or cracker flour has slightly higher protein content than cake flour but lower than all-purpose flour. Its protein content ranges between 9% and 10%. It is available as a white flour, a whole-wheat flour, or a white flour with the germ retained but not the bran. It is suitable for pie pastry and tarts, some cookies, muffins, biscuits, and other quick breads. Flour is shaken through a sieve to reduce the amount of lumps for cooking pastry.
- Whole-wheat flour contains the wheat germ, endosperm and bran. Whole-wheat flour is used in baking of breads and other baked goods, and also typically mixed with lighter "white" unbleached or bleached flours to restore nutrients (especially fiber, protein, and vitamins), texture, and body to the white flours that can be lost in milling and other processing to the finished baked goods or other food(s).
- White flour or refined flour contains only the endosperm
- Whole-wheat white flour is white flour that contains the endosperm, bran, and germ
- Enriched flour is white flour with nutrients added to compensate for the removal of the bran and germ
- Bleached flour is a white flour treated with flour bleaching agents to whiten it (freshly milled flour is yellowish) and give it more gluten-producing potential. Oxidizing agents are usually employed, most commonly organic peroxides like acetone peroxide or benzoyl peroxide, nitrogen dioxide, or chlorine. A similar effect can be achieved by letting the flour oxidize with oxygen in the air ("natural aging") for approximately 10 days; however, this process is more expensive due to the time required. Flour bleached with benzoyl peroxide has been prohibited in the UK since 1997.
- Bromated flour has a maturing agent added. The agent's role is to help with developing gluten, a role similar to the flour bleaching agents. Bromate is usually used. Other choices are phosphates, ascorbic acid, and malted barley. Bromated flour has been banned in much of the world, as bromate is classified as possibly carcinogenic in humans (Group 2B) by the International Agency for Research on Cancer (IARC), but remains available in the United States.
- Self-rising or self-raising flour is white flour that is sold premixed with chemical leavening agents. It was invented by Henry Jones. Self-rising flour is typically composed of the following ratio:
  - 1 cup (100 g) flour
  - 1 1/2 teaspoons (3 g) baking powder
  - a pinch to 1/2 teaspoon (1 g or less) salt

=== Other ===
- Spelt flour is produced from the type of wheat called spelt. It is less commonly used in modern cooking than other wheat varieties. It is still used for specialty baking.
- In the United Kingdom and India whole-wheat flour is more commonly made from white wheat instead of hard winter red wheat, as in the United States.

== Baking characteristics ==
=== W index ===
The W index is an indicator of a flour's strength which is commonly used by professional bakers. It is measured using a Chopin Alveograph, and it takes into account both the toughness and elasticity of the flour's gluten. The W index is often not listed on commercial flour packaging, but it can be approximated based the flour's protein content.

Name	W Index	Protein Content (by Weight)	Example Usage
Weak flour	90 - 160	9% - 10%	Biscuits, cakes.
Medium strength flour	160 - 250	10% - 12.5%	Pizza, focaccia, baguettes, pugliese bread.
Strong flour	above 300	above 13%	Sourdough bread.

In general, a higher W index flour will require a longer rising time for leavened bread products. Higher W index flour better retains the CO_{2} produced during the fermentation process, because the gluten traps the produced gas.

=== Type numbers ===
In some markets, the different available flour varieties are labeled according to the ash mass that remains after a sample is incinerated in a laboratory oven (typically at 550 °C (1,022 °F) or 900 °C (1,650 °F), see international standards ISO 2171 and ICC 104/1). This is an easily verified indicator for the fraction of the whole grain remains in the flour, because the mineral content of the starchy endosperm is much lower than that of the outer parts of the grain. Flour made from all parts of the grain (extraction rate: 100%) leaves about 2 grams (0.071 oz) ash or more per 100 grams (3.5 oz) dry flour. Plain white flour with an extraction rate of 50–60% leaves about 0.4 grams (0.014 oz).

- German flour type numbers (Mehltypen) indicate the amount of ash (measured in milligrams) obtained from 100 g of the dry mass of this flour. Standard wheat flours (defined in DIN 10355) range from type 405 for normal white wheat flour for baking, to strong bread flour types 550, 812, and the darker types 1050 and 1600 for wholegrain breads.
- French flour type numbers (type de farine) are a factor of 10 smaller than those used in Germany, because they indicate the ash content (in milligrams) per 10 g flour. Type 55 is the standard, hard-wheat white flour for baking, including puff pastries (pâte feuilletée). Type 45 is often called pastry flour, and is generally from a softer wheat (this corresponds to what older French texts call farine de gruau). Some recipes use type 45 for croissants, for instance, although many French bakers use type 55 or a combination of types 45 and 55. Types 65, 80, and 110 are strong bread flours of increasing darkness, and type 150 is a wholemeal flour.
- Czech flour types describes roughness of milling instead of amount of ash, though sometimes a numbering system is used, it is not a rule. Czechs determine following four basic types of mill: extra soft wheat flour (výběrová hladká mouka, 00), soft wheat flour (hladká mouka, T650), fine wheat flour (polohrubá mouka), rough wheat flour (hrubá mouka) and farina wheat flour (pšeničná krupice)
- Argentine flour uses roughness of milling as well, being 0, 00, 000 and 0000, where the number of zeroes indicates its refinement.
- Polish flour type numbers, as is the case in Germany, indicate the amount of ash in 100 g of the dry mass of the flour. Standard wheat flours (defined by the PKN in PN-A-74022:2003) range from type 450 to 2000.
- Italian flour type numbers 00, 0, and 1 describe humidity, maximum ashes, maximum cellulose, and minimum gluten content. Actual gluten content is often significantly above the specified minimum. These types were originally specified in LEGGE 4 luglio 1967, n. 580, Titolo II, Art. 7, which was repealed in 2001 and replaced with D.P.R. 9 Febbraio 2001, N.187.

In the United States and the United Kingdom, no numbered standardized flour types are defined, and the ash mass is only rarely given on the label by flour manufacturers. However, the legally required standard nutrition label specifies the protein content of the flour, which is also a way for comparing the extraction rates of different available flour types.

In general, as the extraction rate of the flour increases, so do both the protein and the ash content. However, as the extraction rate approaches 100% (whole meal), the protein content drops slightly, while the ash content continues to rise.

The following table shows some typical examples of how protein and ash content relate to each other in wheat flour:

Residual ash mass	Protein	Wheat flour type										
Residual ash mass	Protein	US (Note: It is possible to determine ash content from some US manufacturers. However, US measurements are based on wheat with a 14% moisture content. Thus, a US flour with 0.48% ash would approximate a French Type 55.)	UK	German/Polish	French	Italian (Note: Italian flour types only specify minimum protein content, but actual protein content can vary significantly within a type.)	Swiss	Czech/Slovak	Polish	Argentine	Japanese	Chinese
~0.4%	~9%	Pastry flour	Soft flour	405	45	00	Weissmehl (Note: French: farine blanche or farine fleur Italian: farina bianca Romansh: frina alva (Sursilvan), farina alva (RG))	Hladká mouka výběrová 00	tortowa	0000	Hakurikiko (薄力粉)	dījīn miànfěn (低筋麵粉)
~0.55%	~11%	All-purpose flour	Plain flour	550	55	0	Weissmehl	Hladká mouka	luksusowa	000	Churikiko (中力粉)	zhōngjīn miànfěn (中筋麵粉)
~0.8%	~14%	Bread flour or "high gluten flour"	Strong or hard	812	80	1	Halbweissmehl (Note: French: farine mi-blanche Italian: farina semibianca Romansh: frina miez alva (Sursilvan), farina mez alva (RG))	Polohrubá mouka	chlebowa	00	Kyorikiko (強力粉)	gāojīn miànfěn (高筋麵粉)
~1.1%	~15%	First clear flour	Very strong or hard	1050	110	2	Ruchmehl (Note: French: farine bise Italian: farina bigia Romansh: frina nera (Sursilvan), farina naira (RG))	Hrubá mouka	sitkowa	0	kyorikimatsufun (強力末粉)	tè gāojīn miànfěn (特高筋麵粉)
>1.5%	~13%	White whole wheat	Wholemeal	1600	150	Farina integrale di grano tenero	Vollkornmehl (Note: French: farine complète Italian: farina integrale Romansh: frina entira (Sursilvan), farina integrala (RG))	Celozrnná mouka	graham, razowa	1/2 0	Zenryufun (全粒粉)	quánmài miànfěn (全麥麵粉) (Note: There is no official Chinese name corresponding to the highest ash residue in the table. Usually such products are imported from Japan and the Japanese name zenryufun (全粒粉) is used, or it is called quánmài miànfěn (全麥麵粉).)

This table is only a rough guideline for converting bread recipes. Since flour types are not standardized in many countries, the numbers may differ between manufacturers. There is no French type corresponding to the lowest ash residue in the table. The closest is French Type 45.

Other measurable properties of flour as used in baking can be determined using a variety of specialized instruments, such as the farinograph.

=== Zeleny sedimentation value ===
The Zeleny sedimentation value is a measurement of how much of the flour sediments during a set period of time in a lactic acid solution. It is used to predict the baking characteristics of a particular cultivar. Since this test has costs associated with it, the Zeleny value may itself be estimated by EM irradiation and spectral analysis of the dry material. Where present, damage by insect pests and fungal diseases are the primary determinants of the sedimentation value, overwhelming the underlying genetic characteristics.

== National flour ==
=== United Kingdom ===
During World War II, the British government promoted national flour, which was adopted in 1942 as a healthy and economic alternative to importing wheat. The flour is described as being of 85% extraction, i.e., containing more of the whole wheat grain than refined flour, generally described as 70% extraction at the time. Parliamentary questions on the exact constitution of national flour in 1943 reveal that it was "milled from a grist consisting of 90 per cent wheat and 10 per cent diluent grains. Authorised additions are calcium at the rate of 7 oz (200 g) per 280 lb (130 kg) of flour and dried milk at the rate of 2 lb (910 g) per 280 lb (130 kg) of flour and customary improvers in normal proportions." The diluent grains were barley, oats and rye and customary improvers were "certain oxidising agents which improve the quality of the bread baked from the flour, and their nature depends on the kind of grain used, whether hard or soft". A survey of the composition of National Flour was conducted for the period 1946–1950. National Flour was discontinued in 1956 against the recommendations of the Medical Research Council as the government considered that the addition of nutritional supplements to refined flour removed the necessity for using national flour on health grounds.

=== Kenya ===
National flour was also a term for a flour introduced in Kenya by the colonial government which contained 70% wheat flour and 30% maize flour.

== See also ==
- Farina
- Flour
- Buckwheat flour
- Fructan
- Grist mill
- Enriched flour
