= Manitoba flour =

High gluten flour of common wheat

Manitoba Flour
- Gran Mugnaio Tipo Manitoba
- Type: Flour
- Place of origin: Canada
- Region or state: Manitoba

Manitoba flour, a name chiefly used in Italy, is a flour of common wheat (Triticum aestivum) originating in the Canadian province of Manitoba. It is a strong flour, and distinguished from weaker flours as measured with a Chopin alveograph.

== Origin ==
This type of flour takes its name from the production area where a strong, cold-resistant wheat originally grew: Manitoba, a vast province in Canada, which in turn takes its name from Manitou, the spiritual and fundamental life force among Algonquian groups.

Currently all flours with deformation energy W > 350 are defined as manitoba whatever the production area and the variety of wheat used.

== Usage ==
The main characteristic of this flour is that it contains a large quantity of insoluble proteins (glutenin and gliadin), which, in contact with a liquid during the kneading phase, produce gluten. It is therefore a flour rich in gluten and poor in starch. Gluten forms a tenacious net, which in leavened doughs retains the gases of leavening, allowing the product to develop considerably during baking; in the case of pasta, on the other hand, it retains the starches, which would make the dough sticky and allow it to be cooked al dente.

It is found in industrial packaging and also in packs for domestic use; it is used by bakers, pastry chefs and pizzerias. In Italy by law and changes introduced by pasta for domestic consumption (except fresh pasta) may be produced exclusively with durum wheat, but in other countries Manitoba flour is also used in the egg-pasta industry. Mills often use it to ‘cut’ other flours, thus increasing the total W coefficient of flour. The dough made with Manitoba will be more elastic and stronger, suitable for the processing of particular bread (French baguette, panettone and pandoro), long-leavening pizza, ciaccia or Easter cheese cakes and special pasta. Since its introduction to Italy as part of the Marshall Plan after World War II, Manitoba flour is preferred by some Italians for Neapolitan pizza.

Manitoba flour is also used as a base for the preparation of Seitan, used by some vegetarians and vegans as a source of protein.

The main characteristic of Manitoba flour is its strength, which, combined with the high presence of proteins and the considerable absorption power of water, makes it suitable for the most complex processes, especially for the preparation of leavened confectionery products. Because of its strength and elasticity Manitoba flour is excellent for making sweet and savoury pandoro and panettone, croissants, doughnuts and baba and also specialties such as focaccia genovese, long-leavening pizzas and some types of bread, such as French baguette and chapati, Indian bread with its characteristic round shape that vaguely resembles a piadina.

== See also ==
- Flour
- Wheat
- Bread
- Canadian White Bread
