= Vitreous =

Vitreous may refer to:

== Materials ==
- Glass, an amorphous solid material
  - Vitreous enamel, a material made by fusing powdered glass to a substrate by firing
- Vitreous lustre, a glassy luster or sheen on a mineral surface

== Biology ==
- Vitreous body, a clear gel that fills the space between the lens and the retina in vertebrate eyes
- Vitreous membrane, a layer of collagen separating the vitreous body from the rest of the eye

== See also ==
- Vitrification, the transformation of a substance into a glass
- Vitreous kernel count, a way to measure protein contents of the grain
