= Vitreous kernel count =

Grain quality measure

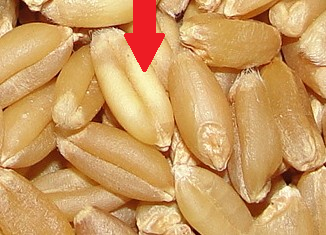
Red arrow points to a non-vitreous "yellow berry" among vitreous kernels of wheat

Vitreous kernel count is a way to characterize grain quality by observing the optical properties of the grains. The appearance of the grain correlates with the level of protein (at least up to protein content of 12.5%.) When the protein content is high enough, the protein binds the starch granules inside the grain and creates a translucent glassy ("vitreous") appearance indicating a desirable high level of kernel hardness. The lack of protein opens air-filled voids in between the starch granules that create light-colored ("mottled") patches, also known as yellow berry. The term hard vitreous kernel (HVK) refers to a visible indication of the kernel hardness, and its specification is used internationally as a primary way to grade the durum wheat.

During the milling process, yellow berry content disintegrates into very small particles, creating tiny mill "fine fractions" or fines that are considered to be of inferior quality for making dough. The higher vitreous count corresponds to better-quality grain with higher output of semolina from milling. For example the Australian wheat grain classes ADR1 and ADR2 are required to have the count of 80% and 70% respectively. The causes of low vitreous kernel count can be genetic (low-protein cultivar) or environmental (lack of nitrogen in nutrition, disease).

The count is expressed as a percentage and is measured by comparing the grains with the photographic standards. Despite the widespread use of the metrics, the details of evaluation greatly differ by country: in 1973, while counting the same sample, the experts from 17 different countries came up with results ranging from 48% to 98% of vitreous kernels. Optical recognition systems were still being developed for the task as of the late 2010s.

The kernel hardness index method that measures the force necessary to crush the grain is suggested as an alternative. However, while it can distinguish between the vitreous grains and the starchy ones, the grains with the intermediate level of the protein (piebalds, non-vitreosus per the Canadian grading standards), have almost the same hardness as the vitreous ones.

== See also ==
- Grain quality#Vitreousness

== Sources ==
- Dowell, F. E. (2000). "Differentiating Vitreous and Nonvitreous Durum Wheat Kernels by Using Near-Infrared Spectroscopy" (PDF). Cereal Chemistry. 77 (2): 155–158. doi:10.1094/CCHEM.2000.77.2.155. ISSN 0009-0352.
- Fu, Bin Xiao; Wang, Kun; Dupuis, Brigitte; Taylor, Dale; Nam, Shin (2017). "Kernel vitreousness and protein content: Relationship, interaction and synergistic effects on durum wheat quality". Journal of Cereal Science. 78: 2–9. doi:10.1016/j.jcs.2017.07.005.
- Fu, Bin Xiao; Wang, Kun; Dupuis, Brigitte; Taylor, Dale; Nam, Shin (2018). "Kernel vitreousness and protein content: Relationship, interaction and synergistic effects on durum wheat quality". Journal of Cereal Science. 79: 210–217. doi:10.1016/j.jcs.2017.09.003.
- Shahin, Muhammad A.; Symons, Stephen J. (2008). "Detection of Hard Vitreous and Starchy Kernels in Amber Durum Wheat Samples Using Hyperspectral Imaging (GRL Number M306)". NIR News. 19 (5): 16–18. doi:10.1255/nirn.1086. ISSN 0960-3360.
- Wrigley, Colin; Batey, Ian L; Miskelly, Diane (2017-01-19). "Mottling − Vitreous Kernel Count". Cereal Grains. Duxford ; Cambridge, MA ; Kidlington: Woodhead Publishing. ISBN 978-0-08-100719-8. OCLC 969962556.
