= Grain quality =

Measurement of quality in agriculture

In agriculture, grain quality judgement depends on the intended use of the grain. In ethanol production, aspects of the chemical composition of grain–and specific aspects such as starch content–are considered important. In food processing and feed manufacturing, properties such as protein, oil, and sugar are significant. In the milling industry, soundness is the most important factor. For grain farmers, high germination percentage and seed dormancy are the main features to consider. For consumers, sensory properties such as color and flavor are most important.

== Properties ==
Overall quality of grain is affected by multiple factors, including growing practices, time and type of harvesting, post-harvest handling, storage methods, and transportation practices.

The properties of grain quality can be summarized into ten main factors:

(i) Uniform moisture content

(ii) High test weight

(iii) No foreign material

(iv) Low percentage of discolored, broken, and damaged kernels

(v) Low breakability

(vi) High milling quality

(vii) High protein and oil content

(viii) High viability

(ix) No aflatoxin (mycotoxin)

(x) No presence of insects and molds.

== Characteristics ==
Grain quality is characterized according to two main types of factors: extrinsic, and intrinsic.

Extrinsic factors of grain grading include age, broken grain, immature grain, foreign matter, infected grain, and moisture content.

Intrinsic factors of grain include: color, composition, bulk density, odor, size, and shape.

Color is an important primary factor for the characterization, grading, trade, and processing of grain, and is a common criterion used in the wheat trade.

Grain composition plays a significant role in the grading and marketing of grains. The main constituents of grain are: carbohydrates, protein, lipids, minerals, fiber, phytic acid, and tannins. The exact composition can vary significantly depending on the species of grain, genetics, varieties, agricultural practice, and handling of the grain.

Bulk density is defined as the ratio of the mass to a given volume of a grain sample, including the interstitial voids (unoccupied spaces) between the particles.

Size and shape are important factors in grain quality and grading; they vary between grain species and even between varieties of the same species. They are commonly factored into rice grading and are key factors in the milling industry.

== Grade and specification ==
Grain grading and specification systems assure that a particular lot of grain meets the standards required by food regulation authorities, such as the Food and Drug Administration (FDA) in the United States and the Food Standards Agency (FSA) in the United Kingdom.

In many countries, grading of grain depends on four main properties: (i) bushel (test) weight, (ii) moisture content, (iii) broken foreign material or the percentage fragments example broken corn foreign materials, and (iv) damaged kernels (i.e. total and heat damaged).

=== Test weight ===
Test (bushel) weight, also known as volumetric weight, is one of the simplest and traditional criteria used to determine quality of grain and measure of grain bulk density. It is an indicator of general grain quality and primary grain specification; normally, a higher the test weight corresponds to higher quality, and lower test weight corresponds to lower quality, as grain quality decreases dramatically as grain deteriorates. Test weight of grain is affected by many factors, including moisture contents (initial and final), frost damage, maturity, growing and harvesting conditions, drying conditions, fine material, amount of kernel damage, and grain variety.

=== Moisture content ===
Moisture content is defined as the quantity of water per unit mass of grain, expressed on a percentage basis (i.e. wet basis or dry basis). Moisture content does not directly affect grain quality, but can indirectly affect quality since grain will spoil if the moisture content is above that of the content recommended for storage.

=== Foreign material ===
Broken foreign material (FM) is an important factor in grading and classification of grains. It is described as foreign material other than grains, such as sand, pieces of rock, microplastics, metals, and pieces of glass, contaminating a particular lot of grain. In the grain trade, presence of more than a set percentage of FM results in either low grades, price discount, or lot rejection, because the higher the FM the more the cost to clean before use.

=== Damaged kernel ===
Damaged kernels (DK) are an important grading factor and negatively affect grain value. DK are considered those that have evident visual damage. It is usually quantified by removing damaged kernels by hand from portions free of impurities. The criteria for each grain of grade include an upper limit for the ampount of damaged kernels: for instance, for wheat to qualify as Grade 1, DK must constitute no more than 0.4% of the total weight. The majority of damage of kernels is caused by insects, heat, mold, weathering, sprouting, frost, diseases, non-uniform maturity, and/or lack of/partial grain filling.

In grading systems or specification, damaged kernels are divided into two main parts: heat damaged and total damaged. СЯыЧ

=== Non-grain-standard properties ===
Important non-grain standards in U.S. grain standards include: (i) breakage susceptibility, (ii) milling quality, (iii) seed viability, (iv) nutritive value, (v) mold count and carcinogen content, and (vi) insect infestation and damage.

Best example of grain quality can be described into two common grains (wheat and rice).

=== Discoloration ===
Grain color is an important characteristic in grain grading. One common form of color deterioration is milled rice discoloration. Rice changes to different classes of milled rice discoloration if stored improperly. Rice discoloration has been shown to largely be due to microbial and chemical reactions depending on storage temperature, moisture content, and duration. Based on U.S. standard, rice will be downgraded if there is one discolored kernel per 500 gr of rice samples.

== Wheat ==
Wheat grain (Triticum aestivum L.) is the world's leading agricultural source of energy, protein and fiber; it belongs to family Gramineae and genus Triticum. Wheat grain can be categorized into three main classes: hard, soft and durum. Wheat quality can best be described in terms of end-user, nutritional quality, milling, and baking and rheology quality. In general, wheat needs to be sound, clean, well matured, and free from foreign material and damage.

In general, criteria for wheat quality can be divided into three main groups: botanical, physical, and chemical characteristics.

=== Botanical criteria ===
There are two main botanical criteria: species and varieties.

=== Physical criteria ===
The main physical properties that influence wheat quality are grain weight (test weight), hardness, grain size and shape, vitreousness, and color. Physical properties of grain such as wheat play a very important role in the quality of the grain, and in final products such as flour.

==== Test weight ====
Test weight of wheat is considered the easiest and most common way to qualify wheat. It is an important quality factor in wheat grading as it gives rough estimates of flour yields. The basic factors that affect the test weight of wheat are kernel size and shape, kernel density, maturity of wheat, anseases and actual wheat variety.

==== Hardness ====
The hardness of wheat endosperm is critical in determining the suitability of wheat for various end products and influences the processing and milling of wheat. It is the common characteristic used by millers and traders to classify wheat. In terms of hardness, wheat can be classified as either hard or soft.

==== Color ====
In terms of color, wheat is classified into two classes: red wheat and white wheat. Hard red winter wheat is considered superior and commonly used for bread flour production, while white wheat is usually used for cakes, chapattis, and certain pasta noodles. Each type of wheat has different properties such as taste, baking quality and milling yields.

==== Vitreousness ====
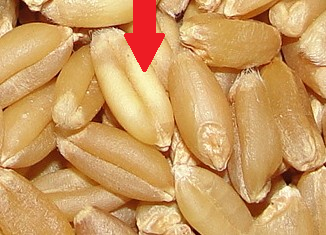
Red arrow points to a non-vitreous "yellow bean" among vitreous kernels of wheat

Wheat vitreousness is an optical property used by many countries to grade or quantify durum wheat quality. Based on this, wheat can be placed into three main classes: vitreous, mealy and piebald. Vitreous durum differs from non-vitreous by kernel appearance and is considered to be of better quality than non-vitreous (starchy and opaque) kernels because of higher output of semolina during milling, good color and uniform coarse granulation.

=== Chemical (quality) properties of wheat ===
==== Moisture content ====
Wheat grain, when harvested, typically has a moisture content of 10–12%. In most countries, moisture content is not part of the grading system, but it is the most important factor affecting the quality of wheat grain, hence is inversely related to dry matter loss. Moisture content is important in wheat quality because:

- too little moisture will cause the wheat grains to break during storage and handling;
- too much moisture will facilitate the growth of mold, which results in deterioration.

==== Protein content ====
Protein is not an explicit wheat grading factor, but its quantity and quality are the most important properties in the wheat business. Most buyers and millers need to know the amount of protein contents of wheat before buying it. Wheat contains five different classes of protein: albumin (soluble in water), globulin (soluble in salt solution), gliadin (soluble in 70% aqueous ethanol), proteose and glutenin (soluble in dilute acid or alkali).

Other important qualities of wheat are milling and baking quality.

==== Milling quality ====
Most wheat is commercially sold as milled flour or semolina, hence milling quality is a crucial factor in the wheat trade. Milling depends on three main factors:

- size and evenness of kernels: there is a close correlation with the weight of grain, determined by thousand-kernel weight.
- texture of the endosperm, characterized by glassiness or pearling index and hardness. They influence the utilization of energy required for milling as well as the amount of semolina obtained.
- percentage ratio of the seed-coat: the larger the kernel the lower the ratio of seed-coat, and if the layers are not thicker, then the percentage of the seed-coat will decrease too, and the color of the endosperm and seed-coat.

==== Baking quality ====
Baking quality is another criterion used to determine the quality and suitability of wheat; baking quality depends on types of wheat uses and processing conditions, for instance the strong (hard) wheat are considered to be of higher quality and suitable for bread making, while most cakes are made from soft wheat flour, baking quality is determined by rheological properties of wheat flour. The rheological property of wheat flour is essential because it determine other physical characteristics such as dough (baking) volume and sensory attributes.

=== Grading and classification of wheat quality ===
Wheat, like other cereals, is graded based on certain criteria, such as: test weight, purity, maximum percentage damaged and foreign materials. In the United States, wheat is classified into classes and sub-classes. In classes, wheat is split into eight different groups: hard red spring, hard red winter, soft red winter, durum, hard white, soft white, mixed and un-classed wheat. These classes are further subdivided into five grades (US. No.1-5), with the exception of unclassed wheat.

== Rice ==
Rice belongs to the genus Oryza of the sub-tribe Oryzinae in the family Graminaea.

Three main categories of rice are:

- long-grain: relatively long and bold types, known as Carolina rice.
- medium-grain: long, thin, cylindrical grain, known as Patna.
- short-grain: short, stout grain, known as Spanish-Japan.

=== Rice grain quality ===
There is no proper definition or description of rice quality; the quality depends on several factors such cooking practice and region and usages. For example, a rice miller will describe rice quality in terms of total recovery and/or head and broken rice kernels, while the food processing industry will define rice quality in terms of grain size, aroma, appearance and cookability.

In general many countries will assess rice quality using four main criteria:

- milling quality
- cooking, eating and processing quality
- nutritional quality
- specific standards for cleanliness, soundness and purity.

In the United States three more factors have been added:

- hull and pericarp
- color grain size, shape, weight, uniformity and general appearance
- kernel chalkiness, translucency and color

=== Physical properties of rice ===
Common physical properties of rice are size, shape, color, uniformity, and general appearance. Other factors that contribute to the general appearance of rice are cleanliness, purity (freedom from other seeds), vitreousness, translucency, chalkiness, color, damaged and imperfect kernel.

In terms of grain size, rice grain can be categories into three main groups:

- length (the size of the rough, brown, or milled rice kernel along its greatest dimension)
- shape (the ratios between length, width, and thickness)
- weight (determined by using 1,000-kernel weight.)

Example of length, shape and weight used in US grading system for brown rice kernels are shown below.

Grain type	Length (mm)	Shape (ratio)	weight (mg)
Long-grain	6.61 to 7.5	over 3	15–20
Medium-grain	5.51 to 6.6	2.1 to 3	17–24
Short-grain	up to 5.5	up to 2.1	20 -24

=== Test weight ===
Test weight is another important grading factor of rice, it is related to bulk density, and used to measure the relative amount of foreign material or immature kernels, it is useful index in milling outturn. The average test weight per bushel of U.S. rough rice is 45 lb.

=== Impurities and damaged rice ===
Impurities and damaged rice considered as single most important factor of rice quality because it directly related to economic value of lot, example presence of sand and stones will increase the weight of grain and damage rubber when sent to the miller. Impurities and damaged rice contains dockage, damaged kernels, chalky grains, red rice, broken seed or kernels and odors.

=== Milling quality or outturn ===
The main objective of rice milling is to remove the outer layer (hull), bran and germ with minimum damage to the endosperm. Milling quality of rice is another important criteria used in marketing, grading and classification of rice, as well as treatment such as conditioning, drying and parboiling, it is normally estimated by using milling yield. Milling yield varied depends on several factors such as grain types, varieties, chalkiness, drying and storing conditions, other includes environmental conditions and moisture contents at harvest.

The milling quality can be determined by two common parameters (i) total yield and (ii) head yield, also another parameters like degree of milling and broken rice are used to estimate milling quality an express in percentage. By definition, milling quality is the ability of rice kernels to stand milling and or polishing without breakage, and to yield higher amount of recovery.

=== Nutritional and cooking quality ===
The nutritional component of rice is one of the most important indicators of quality; rice is predominantly a starchy food though it also contributes useful quantities of proteins and vitamins, mineral, pentosans and fiber. The chemical composition (nutrients) of rice grain varies considerably and depends on factors like plant variety (breeds), environmental condition (i.e. location and season in which grown), fertilizer treatment, degree of milling, and condition of storage. The degree of milling and cooking methods influence loss of significant quantities of nutrients, hence most of the vitamins and minerals are in the surface layers.

The cooking quality is another important criterion as far as quality of rice is concerned, it is influenced by many factors such as cooking methods and time, bulk density, storage condition, varieties and cultivation methods.

The two most important physiochemical properties of cooking quality of rice are amylose content and gelatinization temperature.

=== Amylose content ===
It is another important factors in rice quality. Like other cereal, rice is a good source of starch, especially amylose. It is composed more than 80% starch, and at the molecular level, starch contains amylose (linear chains glucose of α (1–4) linkages) and amylopectin (branched chain glucose with α(1–6) linkage. In terms of amylose rice can be classified as waxy 0–2%, very low 2–10%, low 10–20%, intermediate 20-25% and high 25–32% (rice dry basis). Starch content (amylose) of rice is very important factors in grain yield, processing and palatability.

=== Gelatinization temperature ===
Gelatinization temperature is related to many factors such as cooking time, granula size, molecular size of starch fraction; it is also used as criteria classified rice in some countries. Like other factors it is also influenced by environment such as ripening temperature, genetic and rice varieties as well as cooking time. Gelatinization temperature is direct related to amylose contents; the higher the amylose the higher the gelatinization temperature, hence high waxy rice has higher gelatinization temperature than waxy or very low waxy rice.

=== Classification and grading of rice ===
The main criteria used by many countries and millers to grade rice are degree of milling, appearance (color), damaged (broken) and percentage of chalky kernels. In the United States rice is marketed according to three main properties size, color and condition (kernels damage), these properties direct related to quality, milling percentage and other processing conditions. All properties are important in grading for instance, kernels with chalky are not desirable because give lower milling yields after processing and easy break during handling.

Color and degree of milling is another criterion mostly used to grade rice. By using these criteria rice can be graded into four main classes, under-milled, lightly milled, reasonably milled and well milled. Other factors also considered in grading of rice is test weight hence has been related to milling percentage, empty kernels, immature grain and higher amount of dockage. The average test of kernel weight for rice is 56 kg/hL for long, 58.5 kg/hL for medium and 60 kg/hL for short rice. Grade and requirements of rice in USA

== See also ==
- Food quality
