= Frozen dough =

Bread dough stored at low temperatures

Frozen dough is dough that have been frozen in order to decouple the dough preparation and baking processes of breadmaking (without freezing, the dough must be used quickly once prepared). The frozen dough is used for home baking and by small bakeries, especially the supermarket deli ones, due to the simplicity of baking using the pre-made dough, especially for more complicated products (Danish pastries, croissants). The storage time for frozen dough is limited, although it is constantly increasing due to the improvements in manufacturing. As of 2013, the 16 weeks storage time was typical (lean doughs deteriorate quicker).

== History ==
The commercial manufacturing of frozen dough started in 1945, but the initial attempts to freeze the dough resulted in subpar performance (lower bake expansion due to reduced ability to generate the leavening gas and irregular crumb structure). Improvements to ingredients as well as freezing, thawing and proofing techniques reduced the two primary causes of the deterioration: the damage to cell membranes of the leavening microorganisms and the collapse of the carbon dioxide (CO_{2}) bubbles inside the dough due to the higher solubility of this gas at low temperatures.

== Manufacturing ==
To preserve the yeast during freezing, yeast manufacturers produce special cold-resistant strains. The process typically avoids the use of dehydrated yeast ("active dry" and "instant") in favor of cream or crumble preparations to protect the cell membrane health. The flash freeze is performed quickly after forming of dough to reduce the size of the CO_{2} bubbles. Storage at constant temperatures in the range of -18 °C to -23 °C avoids damage that can be caused by thaw-refreeze cycles.

The formulation of the frozen dough often includes strengtheners like SSL (sodium stearoyl lactylate) and DATEM. The autolysis of yeast that dies off while in storage releases glutathione, so oxidants, like potassium bromate, and ascorbic acid are added in significant amounts (30-50 and 100 ppm respectively in the USA). Many countries do not permit the use of potassium bromate, leaving lipoxygenase enzymes as the only practical alternative in the beginning of the 21st century.

== Use ==
Before use, the frozen dough is slowly (12-18 hours) thawed to the temperatures of 1 °C to 4 °C while avoiding dehydration. After thawing, the dough undergoes proofing that takes about 50% more time than what is used for conventional dough, up to 1 1/2 hours. The baking of the products made from frozen dough is not different from the one used with regular dough.

== See also ==
- Parbaking, freezing the partially baked bread

== Sources ==
- Domingues, D.; Dowd, C. (2015). "Frozen Dough". In Wrigley, C.W.; Corke, H.; Seetharaman, K.; Faubion, J. (eds.). Encyclopedia of Food Grains. Elsevier Science. pp. 354–358. ISBN 978-0-12-394786-4.
- Ribotta, P. D.; León, A. E.; Añón, M. C. (2006-06-23). "Frozen Dough". Bakery Products. Wiley. doi:10.1002/9780470277553.ch21. ISBN 978-0-8138-0187-2.
- Stauffer, C.E. (1993). "Frozen Bakery Products". In Mallett, C.P. (ed.). Frozen Food Technology. Springer US. ISBN 978-0-7514-0072-4.
- Stauffer, C.E. (2013). "Frozen dough production". Advances in Baking Technology. Springer US. ISBN 978-1-4899-7256-9.
- Quick Frozen Foods. Vol. 29. E.W. Williams Publications. 1967.
