= Parcooking =

Cooking technique

Parcooking is the technique of partially cooking foods so that they can be finished later. This technique allows foods to be prepared ahead of time, and quickly heated prior to serving. Since the second reheat finishes the cooking process, foods are not overcooked as leftovers often are. Parcooking is typically used in the processed food industry, and most frozen and ultra-processed foods are prepared this way.

Parcooking also allows one to take advantage of different cooking techniques. For example, one method of preparing french fries involves first boiling, then frying the potatoes, so they have a crisp exterior and fluffy interior. In stir-fries or other mixed dishes, meats, root vegetables, and other foods that take a long time to cook will be parcooked, so they finish at the same time as other foods.

== See also ==
- Parbaking
- Parboiling
