= Canadian white bread =

Type of commercially prepared bread

- Type: Bread
- Place of origin: Canada

Canadian white bread is a style of bread produced or sold by companies including Pepperidge Farm, Trader Joe's and Bimbo Bakeries USA, that has a heartier texture than the white bread typically found throughout the United States and Canada.

== Protein content ==
Because the Canadian Grain Commission requires relatively high amounts of protein in Canadian wheat, Canadian white flour usually has a protein content of 12 or 13%. This contributes to the consistency of Canadian bread.

== See also ==
- Manitoba flour
- Sandwich bread
