= Sprout damage =

Premature sprouting of wheat grains

Sprout damage is undesirable germination of wheat kernels that occurs on mature, unharvested wheat when wet field conditions persist just before and during the harvest. Mature wheat that has been cut and left lying in the field prior to threshing is particularly vulnerable to sprout damage. Early cold weather in Canada often forces wheat producers there to cut and windrow their crop to allow for drying. Wet conditions can then cause widespread sprout damage. If it has occurred, there is a dramatic increase of the enzyme alpha-amylase. The falling number test is a measure of the presence of this enzyme. A high falling number indicates that the wheat is sound and satisfactory for most baking processes. A low falling number indicates that harmful sprouting has occurred and is suggestive of reduced baking quality. In bread, too much alpha-amylase activity will cause wet sticky bread crumb with large voids in the loaf; too little causes dry crumble bread crumb and high loaf density.
