= Falling number =

Test for alpha-amylase activity in flour

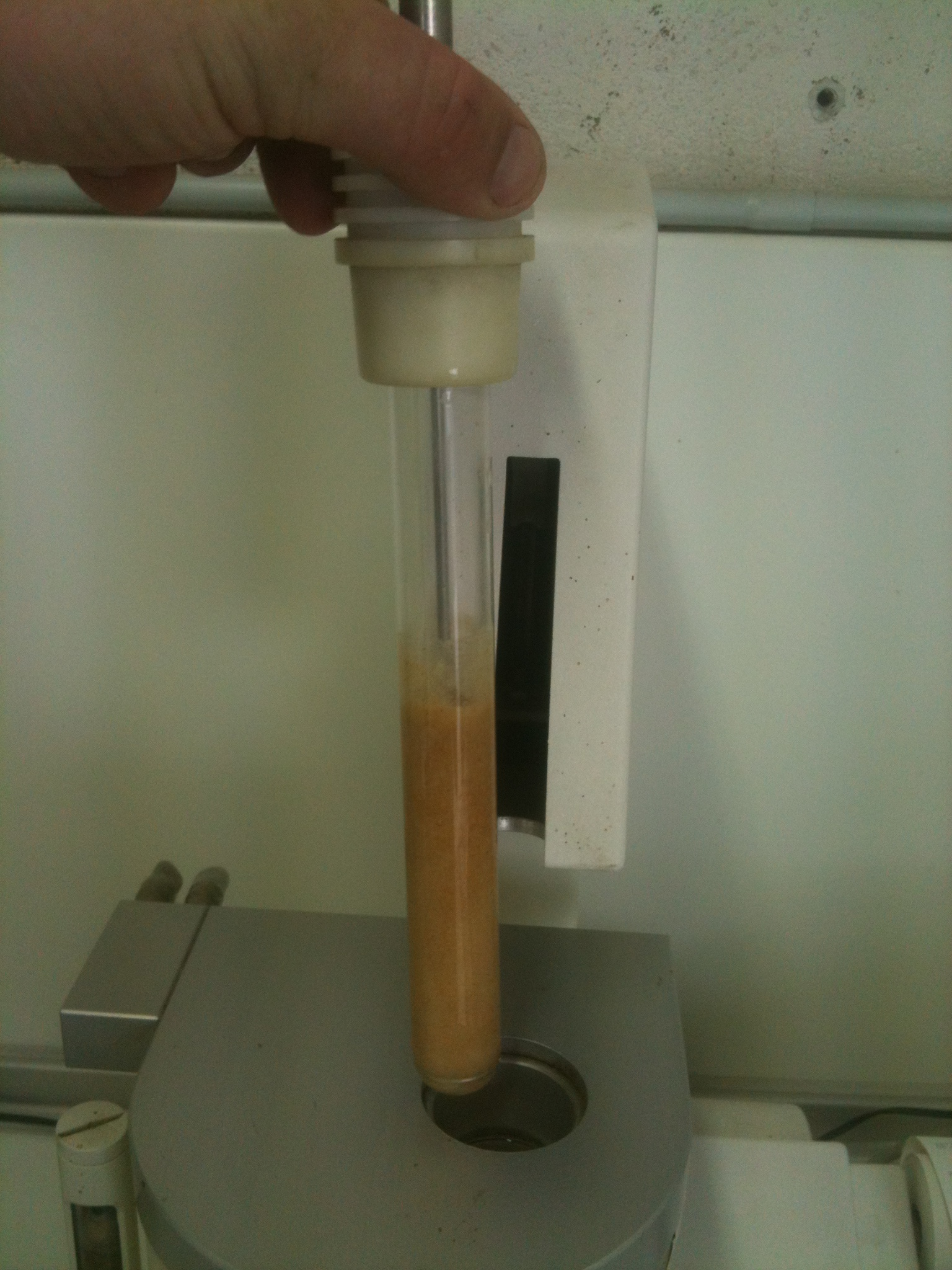
Sample tube after the stirrer has been released.

The falling number (FN), also referred to as the Hagberg number or Hagberg–Perten number, is the internationally standardized (ICC 107/1, ISO 3093-2004, AACC 56-81B) and most popular method for determining sprout damage. With the falling number test, so-called weather- or sprout-damaged wheat or rye, which adversely affects bread-making quality, can be detected at the grain silo intake within a few minutes.

Sprouting, or pre-harvest germination, is caused by damp or rainy weather conditions during the final stage of maturation of the crop. The germination causes an accelerated production of the starch-degrading enzyme alpha-amylase. Severely sprouted grain kernels can contain several thousand times the amount of enzyme of sound un-sprouted kernels. Because of this, very low levels of severely sprouted kernels mixed into sound wheat can cause the entire lot to exhibit significant amylase activity. Since its introduction in the early 1960s, the FN test has become a world standard in the grain and flour milling industries for measuring alpha-amylase activity in wheat, durum wheat, triticale, rye and barley, as well as milled products made from these grains.

== History ==
The falling number method was developed at the end of the 1950s by Sven Hagberg and his co-worker Harald Perten, both at the Cereal Laboratory of the Swedish Institute for the Crafts and Industries.

== Method description ==
The falling number method is uncomplicated, but requires an apparatus which follows the international standards. Such an apparatus consists of a water bath, a test tube, a stirring rod, and a stirring device. The test was performed manually when first employed, test instrumentation today is mostly automated.

1. Flour samples can be analyzed directly. Grain samples are ground to a powder.
2. The sample is put into the test tube, distilled water is added, and the tube is shaken vigorously to achieve a homogeneous mix
3. The tube is placed in the boiling water bath, and the sample is stirred. The starch begins to gelatinize and the slurry becomes more viscous. The mixing ensures the gelatinization is homogeneous in the slurry, crucial for consistent test results. An additional effect of the high temperature is that the alpha-amylase enzyme contained in the grain begins to break the starch down into glucose and maltose, thereby reducing the viscosity of the slurry. The amount of starch break-down is directly proportionate to the alpha-amylase activity, meaning that the higher the activity of the alpha-amylase, the lower the viscosity will be.
4. After 60 seconds of mixing, the stirrer is dropped from the top of the test tube, and the time it takes to reach the bottom is measured. That time, measured in seconds, is the falling number.

The speed at which the stirrer falls is determined by the viscosity of the slurry. Samples with more sprouted grain have greater alpha-amylase activity, which will result in a less viscous slurry and a smaller falling number. Samples with less alpha-amylase activity will be more viscous and have a larger falling number.
