= Parbaking =

Cooking technique

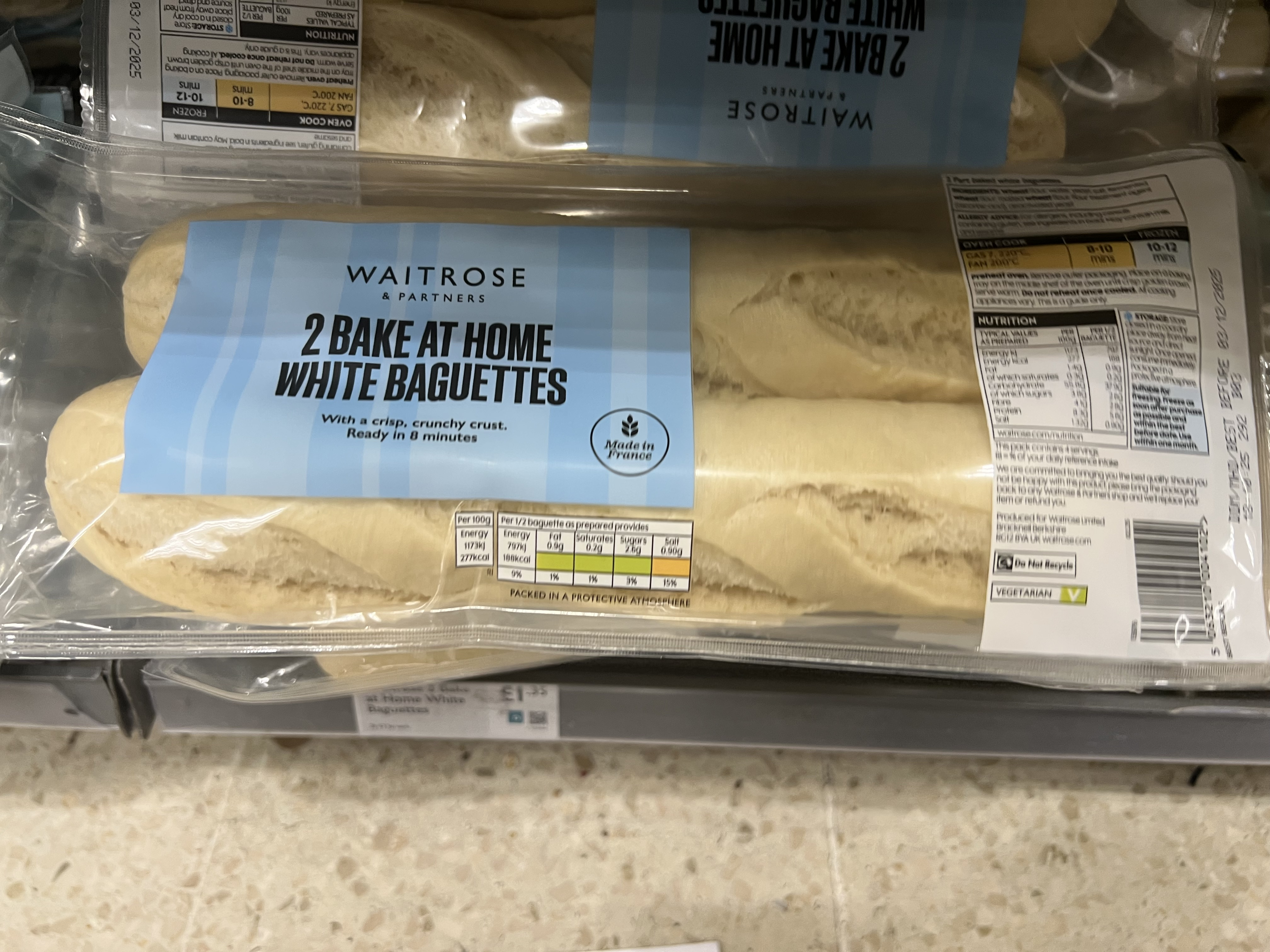
Part baked baguettes in a Waitrose store.

Parbaking (also known as part-baking in the UK) is a cooking technique in which a bread or dough product is partially baked and then rapidly frozen for storage or assembled into a final product. It has been used to increase the mass manufacture and distribution of bread products, including bagels.

== History ==
Parbaking began as a technique used by "Brown 'n Serve Rolls," which have also been called "blondies." In 1949, the Los Angeles Times described the product as the result of experimentation by a former GI, Joseph A. Gregor, who owned a bakery business in Avon Park, Florida.

== Baking ==
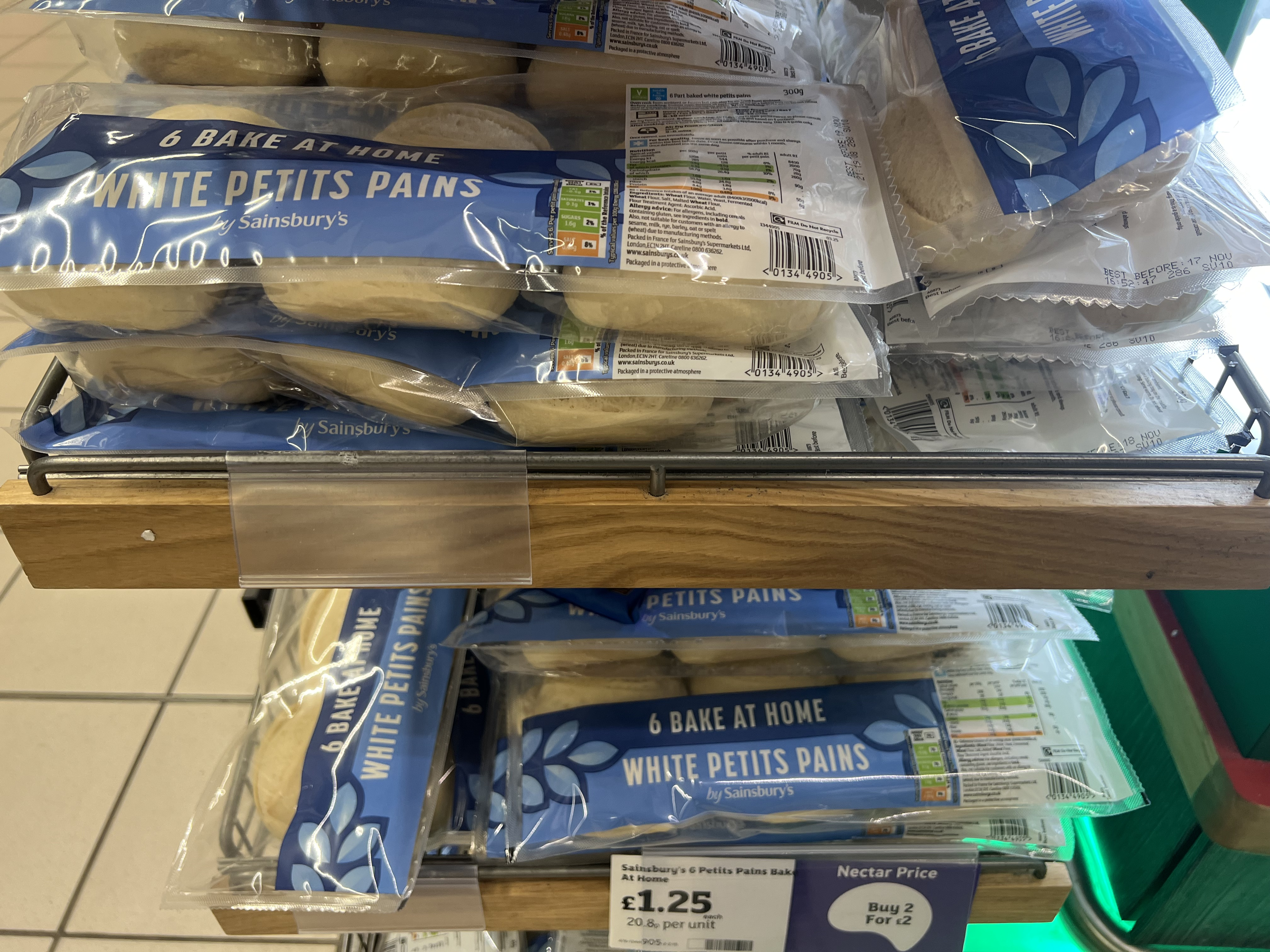
Part baked Petit Pains in a Sainsbury's store.

When parbaking is used to bake bread, it increases the shelf life of the loaf. The raw dough is baked normally, but halted at about 80% of the normal cooking time, when it is rapidly cooled and frozen. Partial cooking kills the yeast in the bread mixture, and sets the internal structure of the proteins and starches (the spongy texture of the bread) so that the inside is sterile and stable, but the loaf has not generated "crust" or other externally desirable qualities that are difficult to preserve once fully cooked. A parbaked loaf of bread is less likely to go stale than a fully baked loaf. It can be transported easily and stored in containers preventing moisture loss until needed. They can also be frozen. A parbaked loaf appears as a risen loaf of bread, with much of the firmness of a finished loaf, but without a browned or golden crust (in the case of a normally light-colored bread). When the final product is desired, a parbaked loaf is completed by baking at a normal temperature, which produces a normal loaf of bread.

Parbaking, also known as blind baking, is used for pastry crusts, as in pies and quiches to prevent sogginess. It is also used to manipulate the taste of pizza crusts through its effect on the yeast content of the dough.

== Criticism ==
Parbaking has been criticized by Cornell University historian of bread Steven Kaplan for its impact on traditional bread baking practices. In 1995, a number of part-baked breads were tested by reviewers, who found: "... if you don't have the time or inclination to make your own bread, you would do better to buy a fresh loaf and heat it up in the oven for a couple of minutes before eating."

== See also ==
- Parboiling
- Parcooking
