= Parboiling =

Partial cooking of food in boiling water

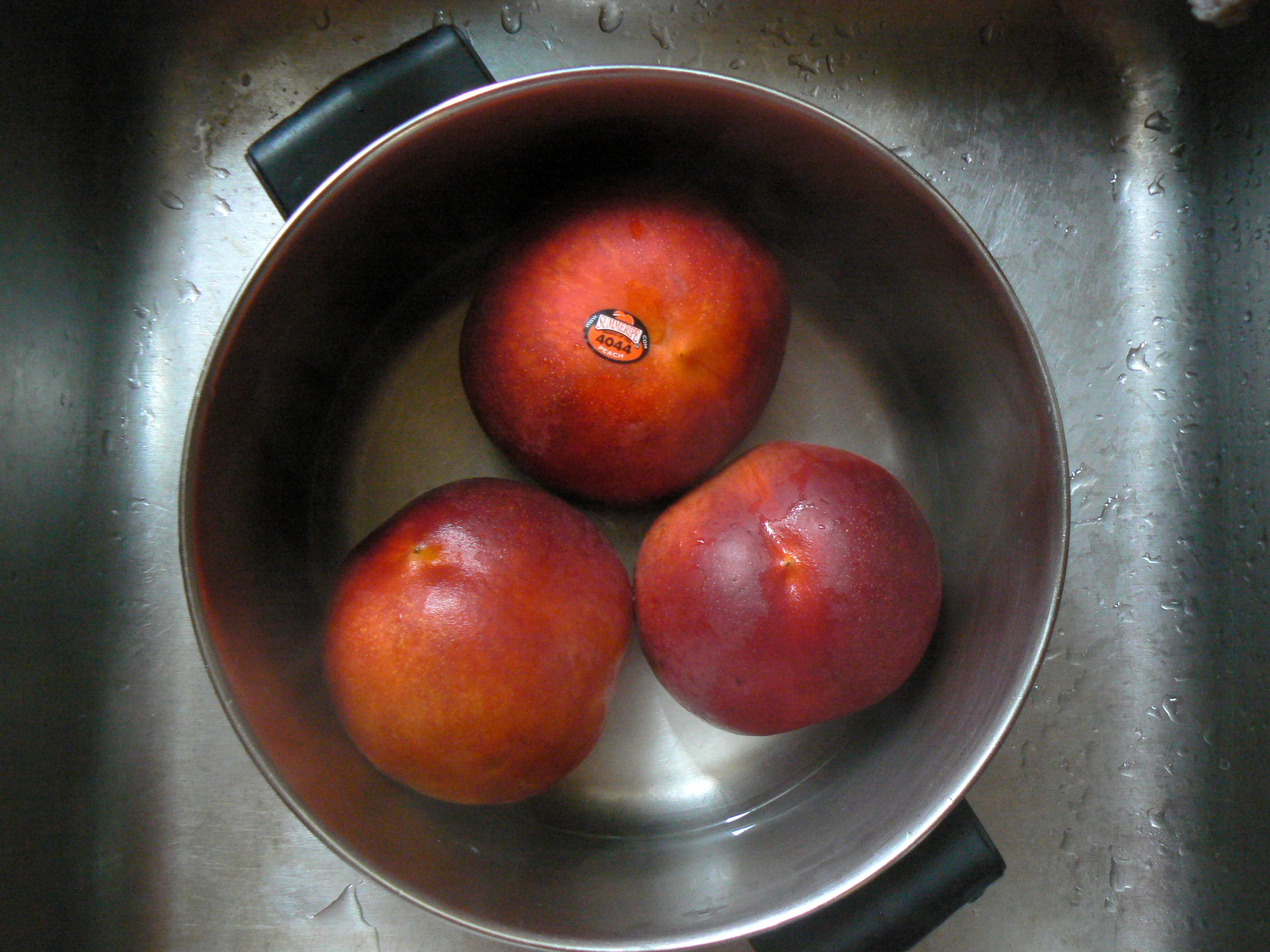
Parboiling peaches to remove their skin

Parboiling (or leaching) is the partial or semi boiling of food as the first step in cooking. The word is from the Old French parbouillir, 'to boil thoroughly' but by mistaken association with "part", it has acquired this definition.

The word is often used when referring to parboiled rice. Parboiling can also be used for removing poisonous or foul-tasting substances from foods, and to soften vegetables before roasting them.

== Basic technique ==
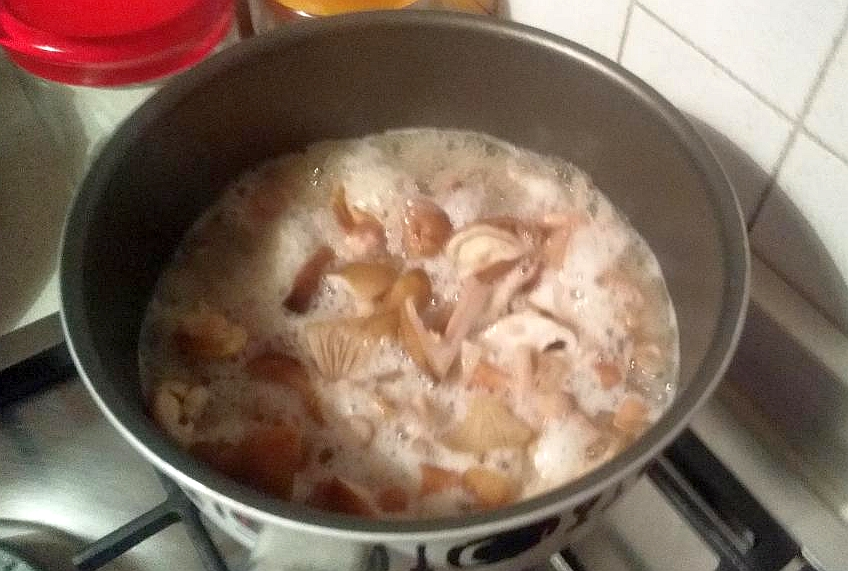
Parboiling honey fungus

The food items are added to boiling water and cooked until they start to soften, then removed before they are fully cooked. Parboiling is usually used to partially cook an item which will then be cooked another way such as braising, grilling, or stir-frying. Parboiling differs from blanching in that one does not cool the items using cold water or ice after removing them from the boiling water.

== Parboiled rice ==
Sometimes raw rice or paddy is dehusked by using steam. This steam also partially boils the rice while dehusking. This process generally changes the colour of rice from white to a bit reddish. This type of rice is eaten in the districts of Udupi and Dakshina Kannada of Karnataka state, in the state of Kerala, and in most parts of Tamil Nadu, Bihar, and West Bengal in India. West Africa and the Afro-Caribbean diaspora are also accustomed to parboiling rice.

== See also ==
- Blanching
- Parbaking
- Parcooking
