= Dry basis =

Dry basis (also d.b., dry matter basis, DM) is an expression of a calculation in chemistry, chemical engineering and related subjects, in which the presence of water (H_{2}O) (and/or other solvents) is neglected for the purposes of the calculation. Water (and/or other solvents) is neglected because addition and removal of water (and/or other solvents) are common processing steps, and also happen naturally through evaporation and condensation; it is frequently useful to express compositions on a dry basis to remove these effects. For example, an aqueous solution containing 2 g of glucose and 2 g of fructose in a total of 5 g of solution contains 2/(2+2)=50% glucose on a dry basis, and this ratio will not change if some water is added or evaporated.

In many cases, the drying of the sample to perform the measurement is impractical, so in addition to the dry basis, other bases are used:

1. As-is: the measurement is performed with whatever water content there is (the above example will yield 2/5=40% glucose at 20% moisture). When dealing with the grain used as feed, this is also called an as-fed basis.
2. A fixed moisture basis (m.b., in the United States grain industry 13% or 15% moisture reference levels are typical). The measurement is still taken with whatever moisture content there is, but the result is recalculated to the reference level using a simple formula: $P_{ref} = \frac {100 - M_{ref}} {100 - M_{meas}} \cdot P_{meas}$, where M designates the reference and as-measured moisture percentages and M corresponds to the as-measured and adjusted constituent percentage. For example, at the 15% moisture basis, the level of glucose in the example above will be $\frac {100-15} {100-20} \cdot 40 = 42.5%$ Naturally, the percentage can be recalculated to the dry basis, too, yielding the original result of the example: $\frac {100-0} {100-20} \cdot 40 = 50%$.

Similar terms, but with a different meaning, are used in food science and pharmacy when the moisture content itself is measured. On the wet basis the value is the ratio of the weight of water to the total weight of the solution (1 / 5 = 20% in the example), so the moisture content is always below 100% (in the previous examples the moisture content was specified on this "moisture content wet basis"). For the moisture content dry basis the ratio of the weight of the water to the weight of the dry matter (1 / (2+2) = 25% in the above example) is used, so the value can be above 100% if there is more water than dry matter in the solution.

== Sources ==
- Iowa State University (2006). "Moisture Basis Conversions for Grain Composition Data".
- Singh, R. Paul; Heldman, Dennis R. (2009). Introduction to Food Engineering. Amsterdam; Boston: Academic Press. ISBN 978-0-12-370900-4.
