= Farinograph =

Measures specific properties of flour

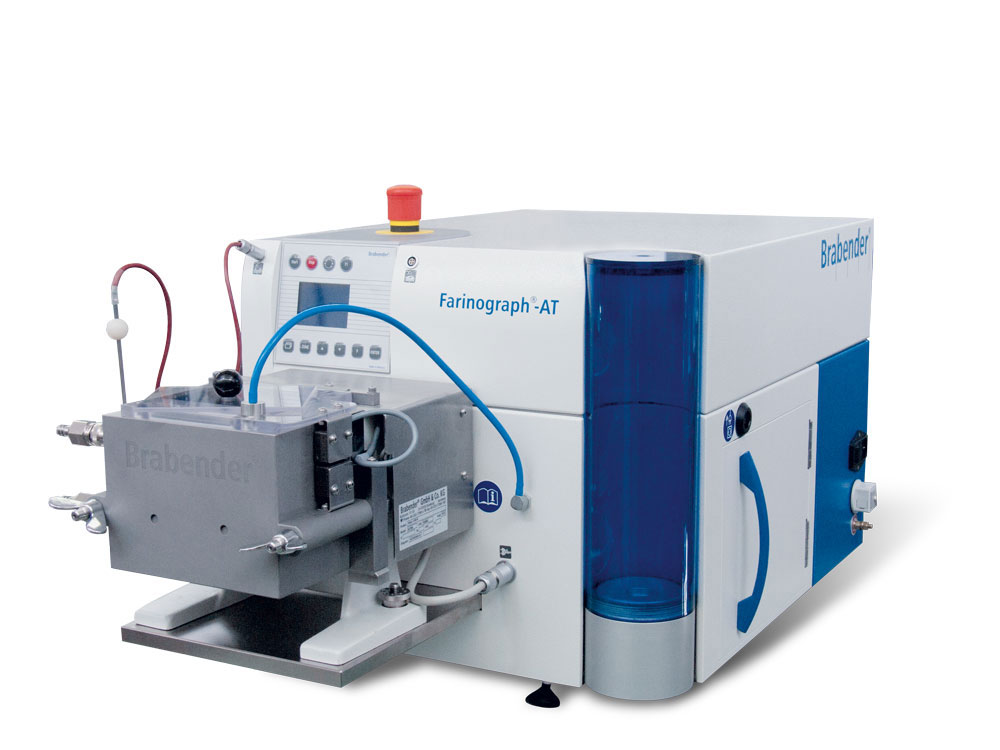
A Brabender farinograph

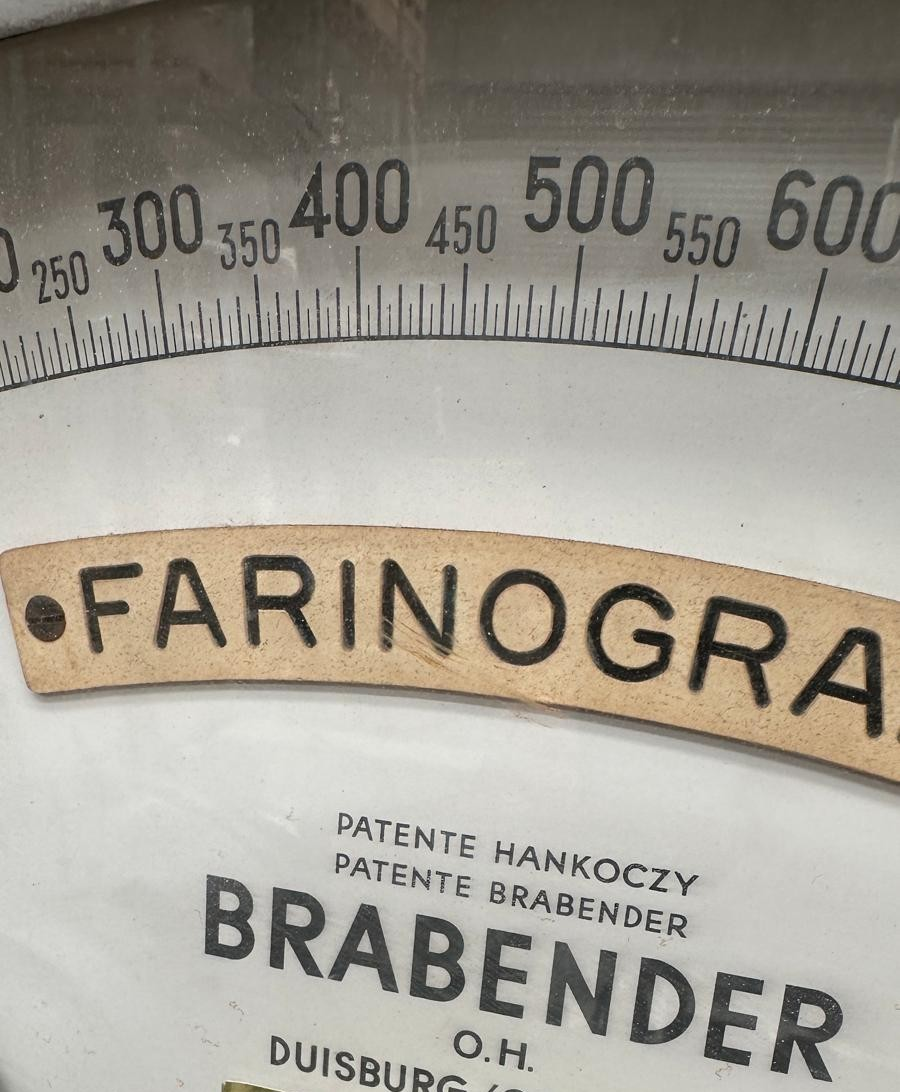
Mechanical farinograph

In baking, a farinograph measures specific properties of flour. Its underlying principles were first introduced in 1912 by Hungarian chemist Jenő Hankóczy, and the instrument was later industrialized and launched in 1928 by Carl Wilhelm Brabender in Germany. The farinograph is a tool used for measuring the shear and viscosity of a mixture of flour and water. The primary units of the farinograph are Brabender Units, an arbitrary unit of measuring the viscosity of a fluid.

A baker can formulate end products by using the farinograph's results to determine the following:

- Water absorption
- Dough viscosity, including peak water to gluten ratio prior to gluten breakdown
- Peak mixing time to arrive at desired water/gluten ratio
- The stability of flour under mixing
- The tolerance of a flour's gluten

== Method ==
The farinograph is drawn on a curved graph with the vertical axis labeled in Brabender Units (BU) and the horizontal axis labeled as time in minutes. The graph is generally hockey-stick shaped, with the curve being more or less acute depending on the strength of the gluten in the flour.

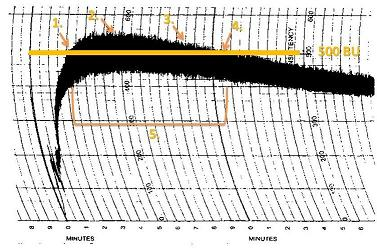
The graph is from a gluten rich bread flour, as its stability time is relatively long and the MTI is still above the 500 BU line. A weaker flour, such as a cake or pastry flour with a much lower gluten content would have a much steeper decline after peak time.

The points of interest on the graph are fivefold:

1. Arrival Time (Absorption) – Absorption is the point chosen by the baking industry which represents a target water to flour ratio in bread. This ratio is marked at the 500 BU line and is taken as a rule of thumb for desired taste, texture, and dough performance during proofing and baking. All other measurements are based on this 500 BU standard. (For comparison, the accepted BU is 1000 or greater for noodles). Thus on the graph above, Arrival time is the point on the graph where the top of the curve reaches the 500 BU point and indicates the rate of absorption (minutes/BU).
2. Peak time – Peak time is reached at the highest point on the curve, and indicates when the dough has reached is maximum viscosity before gluten strands begin to break down.
3. Mixing Tolerance Index (MTI) – MTI is found by taking the difference in BU between the peak time point (on the graph above 3 minutes, 30 seconds) and 5 minutes after peak time is reached. This is used by bakers to determine the amount that a dough will soften over a period of mixing. MTI may be expressed as a value in BU or as a percentage of BU lost over time ($\tfrac{BU^n-BU^{n-x}}{BU^n}$).
4. Departure Time – Departure time is defined as the point at which the top of the curve goes below the 500 BU line. This point is generally considered the point at which gluten is breaking down and dough has become over mixed.
5. Stability – Stability is the point between arrival time and departure time and generally indicates the strength of a flour (how much gluten a flour has and how strong it is).

== Applications ==
The Farinograph is used worldwide by bakers and food technicians in building bakery formulations. The farinograph gives bakers a good snapshot of the flour's properties and how the flour will react in different stages of baking, which helps them pick a certain flour for any given purpose. Millers use the Brabender Farinograph to access the properties of the flour, to ascertain whether changes need to be made in the mill. The miller also uses the farinograph to prepare dough for further testing for extensibility after a resting period (akin to proofing) with the Brabender Extensograph.

The industrial application of these five points is far reaching. A baker may use, for example, the arrival time as a bare minimum time when planning full product floor time for a batch of dough. A baker may also use MTI as guideline to judge the response of a dough to the addition of other ingredients. Peak time may be used as a target mix time for optimal gluten structure and resilience. Stability may be used as a method of determining desired cell structure before irreparable gluten breakdown occurs.

== History ==
The concept behind the Farinograph was first developed by Hungarian agricultural chemist Jenő Hankóczy in the early 20th century. In 1905, he introduced the Farinométer, a device to measure gluten strength and extensibility. By 1912, he had advanced the design to include water absorption and dough consistency evaluation—core principles that laid the foundation for modern rheological testing. While the Farinograph was industrialized and launched commercially in 1928 by Carl Wilhelm Brabender in Germany, Hankóczy’s earlier innovations provided the scientific basis for its development.

== Sources ==
- Starch in food: structure, function and applications. Ann-Charlotte Eliasson. CRC Press, 2004. ISBN 0-8493-2555-2, ISBN 978-0-8493-2555-7
- US Department of Agriculture Agricultural Research Service.
- American Association of Cereal Chemists
