= Chopin alveograph =

Tool for flour quality measurement

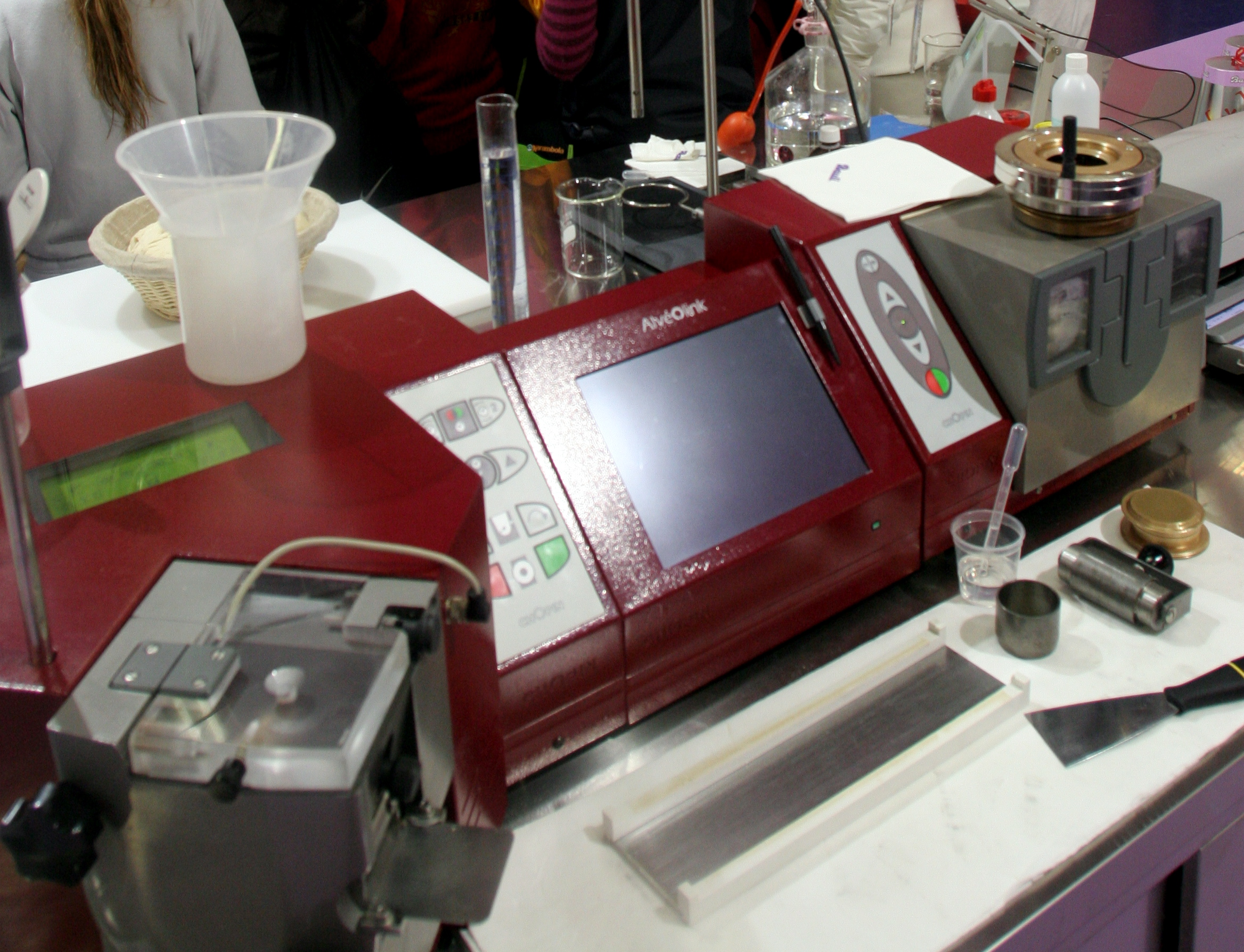
Chopin alveograph exposed at the Festival della Scienza, 2007.

The Chopin Alveograph (originally named Extensimeter) is an empirical tool for wheat flour quality measurement. It measures the properties of the dough produced from the flour, by inflating a bubble in a thin sheet of the dough until it bursts. This process is supposed to simulate the natural bubble growth during the fermentation and in the early stages of baking. An analysis of the recorded graph of pressure vs. bubble volume yields about ten values that characterize the suitability of the flour for different uses. As of the 2020s, the device is manufactured by Chopin Technologies (since 2016, a part of KPM Analytics). A similar device for bubble inflation, D/R Dough Inflation System, is made by Stable Micro Systems.

== History ==
The idea of wheat grain classification by using a bubble made of dough dates back to 1905, when a Hungarian, Jenö von Hankoczy, created a "gluten tester". The tester measured only the maximum expansion of the bubble before bursting and, like other early devices, had no temperature control.

Developed independently in the late 1920s in France by Marcel Chopin, the Chopin Alveograph performs the alveographic test that enables to measure the tenacity (resilience), extensibility, and elasticity of a dough (standardized mix of flour and water). This measurement, known as dough strength, is considered a good index of the baking quality of baking flours.

The original "extensimeter" design by Chopin was created in 1921 and tested the tenacity of dough (then defined as time it took to change the shape of a cylinder made of dough) and the ability of the sample to be stretched into a thin membrane by pushing air into the sample. The extensimeter had temperature control since the original model, a version with a better recorder came out in 1927. By the mid-1930s, an integrated dough mixer was added. In 1982, an air pump was introduced to pump up the bubble instead of using the gravity of a column of water to expel the air. In 1987, a timer and temperature display were added, bubble blowing was automated in the 1995 model. A completely new design, so called "NG", was introduced in 1995 and included a consistograph.

In France it has been used in regulations since at least 1963 as a criterion in milling for the composition of flours destined to the "french" type bread-baking.

KPM Analytics produces a derivative device called the Mixolab which, among other uses, measures the degree of degradation due to pest and fungus, and the protection provided by insecticides and fungicides.

== Description ==
The Chopin alveograph is composed of four parts:

1. a "mixer" kneading-machine with an extraction passage which enables the development of the dough and the extraction of it for the preparation of the dough pieces in order to realize the alveographic test;
2. an alveograph itself (the bubble-blowing device) which measures the three-dimensional extension of the piece of dough, which is deformed like a bubble. That extension mode reproduces the deformation of the dough under the influence of the pushing of gas.
3. a recording manometer or an Alveolink calculator to record the pressure;
4. a printer.

== Testing results ==
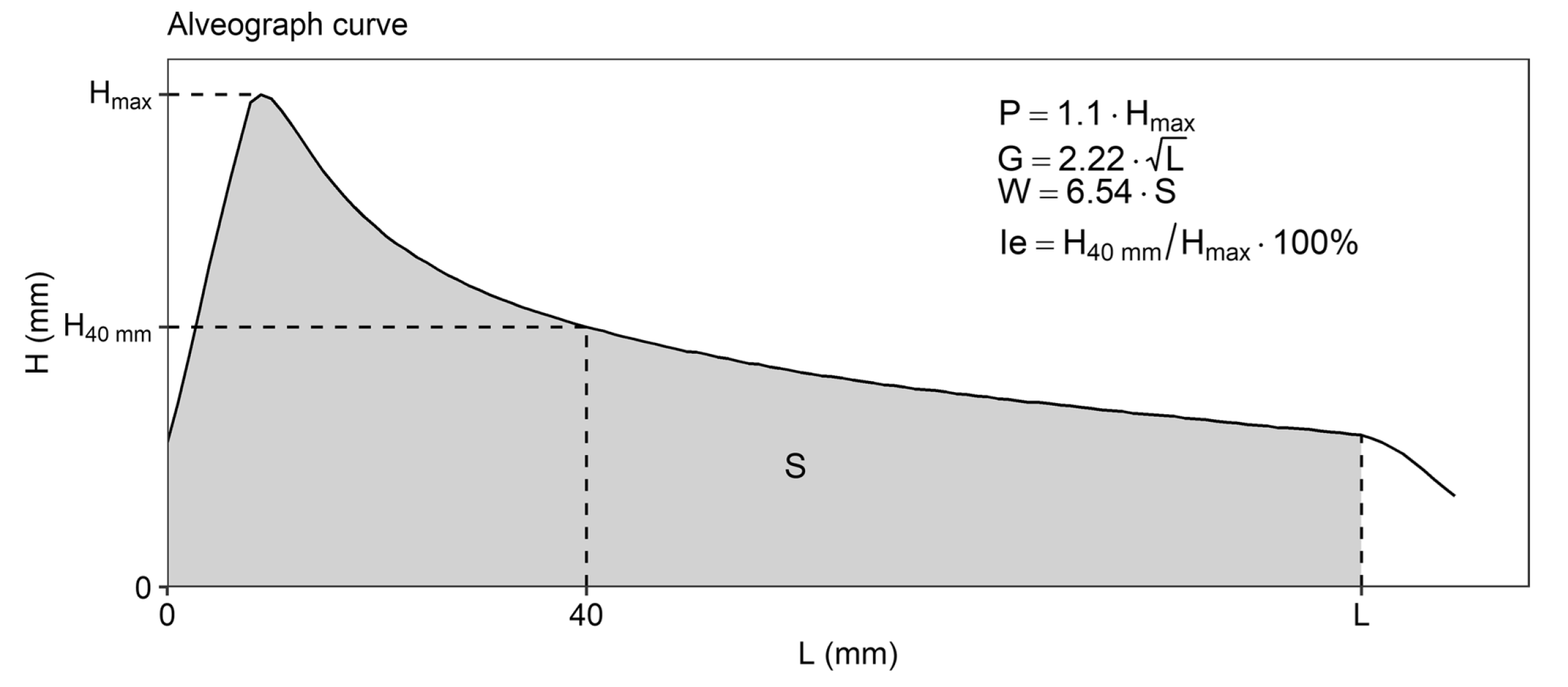
Dough bubble inflation graph of pressure H (in mm of water) vs extension L (in mm, converted from time)

The test is performed by slowly inflating the bubble and recording the pressure H (expressed in mm of water) vs. abscissa L (that is also expressed in millimeters, but in reality is just time from the start of the test in seconds converted into mm at a fixed rate of 5.5 mm/s). The correction coefficients are applied for compatibility with the earlier models.

Originally, the following results were collected from the pressure graph: maximum overpressure (P), average abscissa to rupture (L), swelling index (G), configuration ratio (P/L) and deformation energy (W). After the introduction of computerized processing, more parameters were added, like the elasticity index (Ie), and minimum and maximum of first derivative (Dmin/Dmax). Pressure curve was converted into the stress–strain curve, yielding the strain hardening index (SH) and the strength coefficient (K).

Jødal & Larsen (2021) suggest that G, Dmax, SH and K are near-perfectly correlated to L, P, Ie and P respectively, thus the basic set of parameters obtained on the alveograph contains just six values: P, L, W, P/L, Ie and Dmin.

The measurements are typically repeated multiple times and averaged.

=== Maximum overpressure (P) ===
The maximum overpressure is the highest pressure that occurs during the test, multiplied by 1.1 (the coefficient accommodates the measurement error introduced by a water manometer of the earliest models). P is called the dough "tenacity", often used, but has no corresponding rheological value and thus is interpreted in multiple ways.

=== Average abscissa to rupture (L) ===
The bursting of the bubble is manifested by a rapid decline in pressure (right side of the graph). The corresponding abscissa point, L, is called "extensibility", and characterizes the maximum stretch that dough can experience without breaking. It is an important parameter in breadmaking, as high values of L make possible breads with high volume and fine crumb structure.

=== Swelling index (G) ===
The swelling index G expresses the volume of air (in milliliters) needed to rupture the bubble. Since the air is fed at a constant rate, G is a square root of L (in mm) with a scaling coefficient that, depending on the version of the manual, is either 2.22 or 2.226: $G = 2.226 \sqrt L$. It has the same significance as L, yet also is considered to be affecting the "shortness" and "spring" of the dough.

=== Deformation energy (W) ===
The product of force (pressure) and time is energy, thus the area under the pressure curve is proportional to the energy used to inflate the bubble, or deformation energy W. W factor is one of the most used values for the characterization of wheat (separating wheat cultivars), and is referred to as "strength" (dough strength, flour strength, baking strength, flour protein strength, gluten strength, etc). W is closely related to the percentage and quality of gluten in the dough, but is also affected by other factors, including the water absorption. Strong dough can withstand the mechanical stress of the breadmaking process through a balanced combination of viscosity and elasticity.

The value is typically expressed in Joules (J) units. Due to numbers being low, a scaling factor is frequently used (the practical units are $J \cdot 10^{-4}$), bringing the typical values into a three-digit range.

=== P/L ratio ===
The ratio of P to L is called the configuration ratio. The high ratio reflects a strong and inextensible dough, while low values correspond to a weak and extensible one. While P/L seems to characterize a balance between tenacity and extensibility, the P/L requirements frequently do not change across the areas of use, and it is less frequently used.

=== Elasticity index (Ie) ===
The elasticity index Ie is defined as ratio of pressure corresponding to the 40 mm abscissa and the maximum overpressure P, expressed as percentage: $Ie = \frac {H_{40mm}} P \cdot 100%$. Since the volume of air pumped into the bubble at this point in time is about 200 ml, the 40 mm pressure is also denoted as P_{200}, so $Ie = \frac {P_{200}} P \cdot 100%$ For more extensible doughs, the pressure might never reach 40 mm, and Ie cannot be determined. The 40 mm abscissa is selected to reflect the moment when the resistance to deformation is expected to no longer depend on the thickness of dough and thus reflect the internal bonding force. There is a positive correlation had been found between the Ie and the bread volume.

=== Dmin and Dmax ===
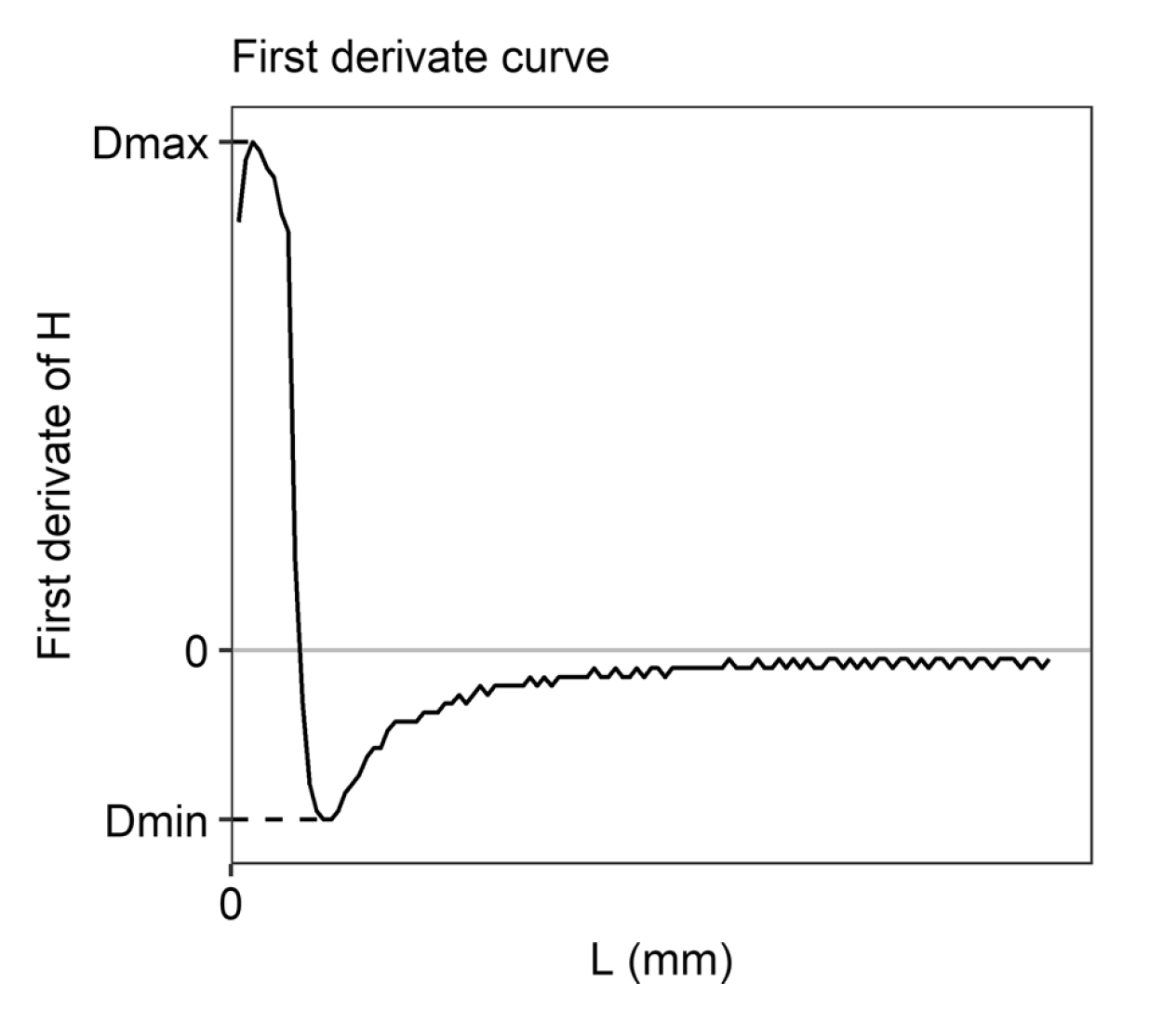
First derivate curve of the alveograph data

A first derivate can be taken of the pressure curve, the minimum and maximum values of the derivative are denoted Dmin and Dmax respectively. Dmin thus defined is negative, so sometimes an absolute value is used. Lower Dmin values correlate to higher volume of bread. Dmax, while reported by the alveograph, is apparently not used in practice.

=== Strain hardening index (SH) and strength coefficient (K) ===
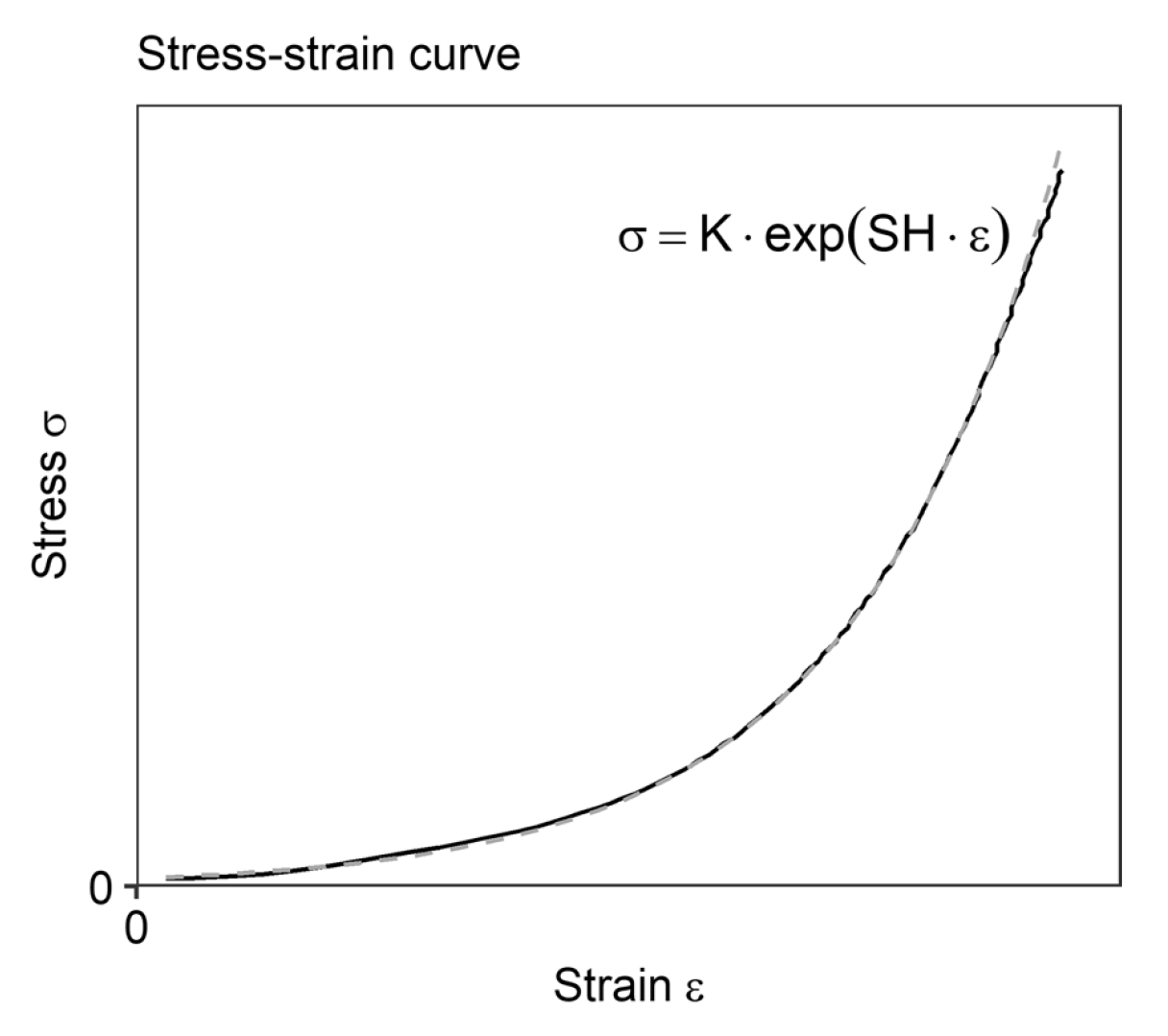
A stress-strain curve

The relationship between stress $\sigma$ and Hencky strain $\epsilon$ can be described by a stress-strain curve $\sigma = K \cdot e^{{SH} \cdot \epsilon }$, where SH and K are empirical coefficients best-fit using the alveograph curve. The exponential part of the equation reflects the strain hardening caused by the properties of gluten network. High SH improves the condition for inflation of dough bubbles in the bread. K defines the stress when there is no strain. It is higher for more stiff or viscous dough and, probably due this mixing of two different properties in one value, used less frequently than SH.

== Bibliography ==
- Chopin, Marcel, Cinquante années de recherches relatives aux blés et à leur use industrielle, Boulogne, 1973. OCLC 463088833

== Sources ==
- Dubois, M.; Dubat, A.; Launay, B. (2016). AlveoConsistograph Handbook. American Association of Cereal Chemists International. Elsevier Science. ISBN 978-0-12-810458-3.
- Jødal, Anne-Sophie Schou; Larsen, Kim Lambertsen (5 March 2021). "Investigation of the relationships between the alveograph parameters" (PDF). Scientific Reports. 11 (1): 5349. Bibcode:2021NatSR..11.5349J. doi:10.1038/s41598-021-84959-3. ISSN 2045-2322. PMC 7935897. PMID 33674707.
- "Union Park announces acquisition of Chopin Technologies". Union Park Capital. 30 June 2016.
- Wooding, A. R.; Kavale, S.; MacRitchie, F.; Stoddard, F. L. (1999). "Link Between Mixing Requirements and Dough Strength" (PDF). Cereal Chemistry. 76 (5): 800–806. doi:10.1094/CCHEM.1999.76.5.800. ISSN 0009-0352.
