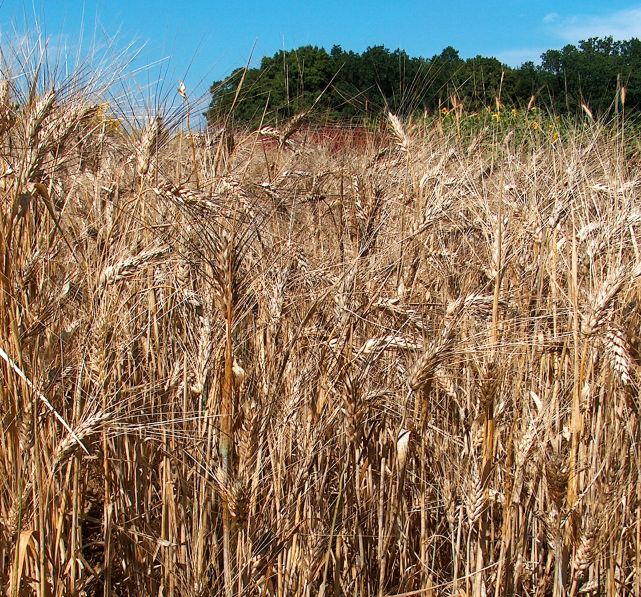
- Triticum durum ready to be harvested

Scientific classification
- Kingdom: Plantae
- Clade: Embryophytes
- Clade: Tracheophytes
- Clade: Spermatophytes
- Clade: Angiosperms
- Clade: Monocots
- Clade: Commelinids
- Order: Poales
- Family: Poaceae
- Subfamily: Pooideae
- Genus: Triticum
- Species: T. durum

Binomial name
- Triticum durum Desf.

Synonyms
- List: Triticum accessorium Flaksb. nom. inval.; Triticum alatum Peterm.; Triticum algeriense Desf. ex Mert. & W.D.J.Koch nom. inval.; Triticum bauhinii Lag.; Triticum brachystachyum Lag. ex Schult. & Schult.f. nom. inval.; Triticum candissimum Bayle-Bar.; Triticum caucasicum Flaksb. nom. inval.; Triticum cevallos Lag.; Triticum cochleare Lag.; Triticum densiusculum Flaksb. nom. inval.; Triticum fastuosum Lag.; Triticum hordeiforme Host; Triticum laxiusculum Flaksb. nom. inval.; Triticum longisemineum Flaksb. nom. inval.; Triticum maurorum Sennen nom. inval.; Triticum molle Roem. & Schult. nom. inval.; Triticum orientale Flaksb. nom. inval.; Triticum platystachyum Lag.; Triticum pruinosum Hornem.; Triticum pyramidale Percival; Triticum rarum Flaksb. nom. inval.; Triticum rimpaui Mackey; Triticum siculum Roem. & Schult.; Triticum tanaiticum Flaksb. nom. inval.; Triticum tiflisiense Flaksb. nom. inval.; Triticum tomentosum Bayle-Bar.; Triticum transcaucasicum Flaksb. nom. inval.; Triticum trevisium Desv. nom. inval.; Triticum venulosum Ser.; Triticum villosum Host

= Durum wheat =

Durum

Species of wheat used for food

Durum (/ˈdjʊərəm/), also called pasta wheat or macaroni wheat (Triticum durum or Triticum turgidum subsp. durum), is a tetraploid species of wheat. It is the second-most cultivated species of wheat after common wheat, although it represents only 5 to 8% of global wheat production. It was developed by artificial selection of the domesticated emmer wheat strains formerly grown in Central Europe and the Near East around 7000 BC, which developed a naked, free-threshing form. Like emmer, durum is awned (with bristles). It is the predominant wheat grown in the Middle East.

== Taxonomy ==
Some authorities synonymize "durum" and Triticum turgidum. Some reserve "durum" for Triticum turgidum subsp. durum. The grain classification for durum is typically based on the hard vitreous kernel (HVK) count.

Durum in Latin means "hard". The species is the hardest of all wheats regarding its resistance of the grain to milling, in particular of the starchy endosperm, causing dough made from its flour to be weak or "soft".

== Genetics ==
Durum is a tetraploid wheat, having four sets of chromosomes for a total of 28, unlike hard red winter and hard red spring wheats, which are hexaploid (six sets of chromosomes) for a total of 42.

Durum originated through intergeneric hybridization and polyploidization involving two diploid (having two sets of chromosomes) grass species: T. urartu (2n=2x=14, AA genome) and a B-genome diploid related to Aegilops speltoides (2n=2x=14, SS genome) and is thus an allotetraploid (having four sets of chromosomes, from unlike parents) species.

Durum—and indeed all tetraploids—lack Fhb1 alleles. The only exception is found by Buerstmayr et al. (2012) on the 3B chromosome.

One of the predominant production areas of durum—Italy—has domesticated varieties with lower genetic diversity than wild types, but subspecies T. d. turanicum, T. d. polonicum, and T. d. carthlicum have a level of diversity intermediate between those groups. There is evidence of an increase in the intensity of breeding after 1990.

== Uses ==
Commercially produced dry pasta, or pasta secca, is made almost exclusively from durum semolina. Most homemade fresh pastas also use durum or a combination of soft and hard wheats. Its hardness makes it favorable for semolina and pasta and less practical for flour, which requires more work to mill than with hexaploid wheats such as common bread wheats.

Husked but unground, or coarsely ground, it is used to produce the semolina in the couscous of North Africa and the Levant. It is also used for Levantine dishes such as tabbouleh, kashk, kibbeh, bitfun, and the bulgur for pilafs. In North African and Levantine cuisines, it forms the basis of many soups, gruels, stuffings, puddings, and pastries. When ground as fine as flour, it is used for making bread. In the Middle East, it is used for flat, round breads, and in Europe and elsewhere, it can be used for pizza or torte. In South Asia, Bombay rava is used widely for puddings and flatbreads.

The use of wheat to produce pasta was described as early as the 10th century by Ibn Wahshīya of Cairo. The North Africans called the product itrīya, from which Italian sources derived the term tria (or aletría in the case of Spanish sources) during the 15th century.

== Production ==
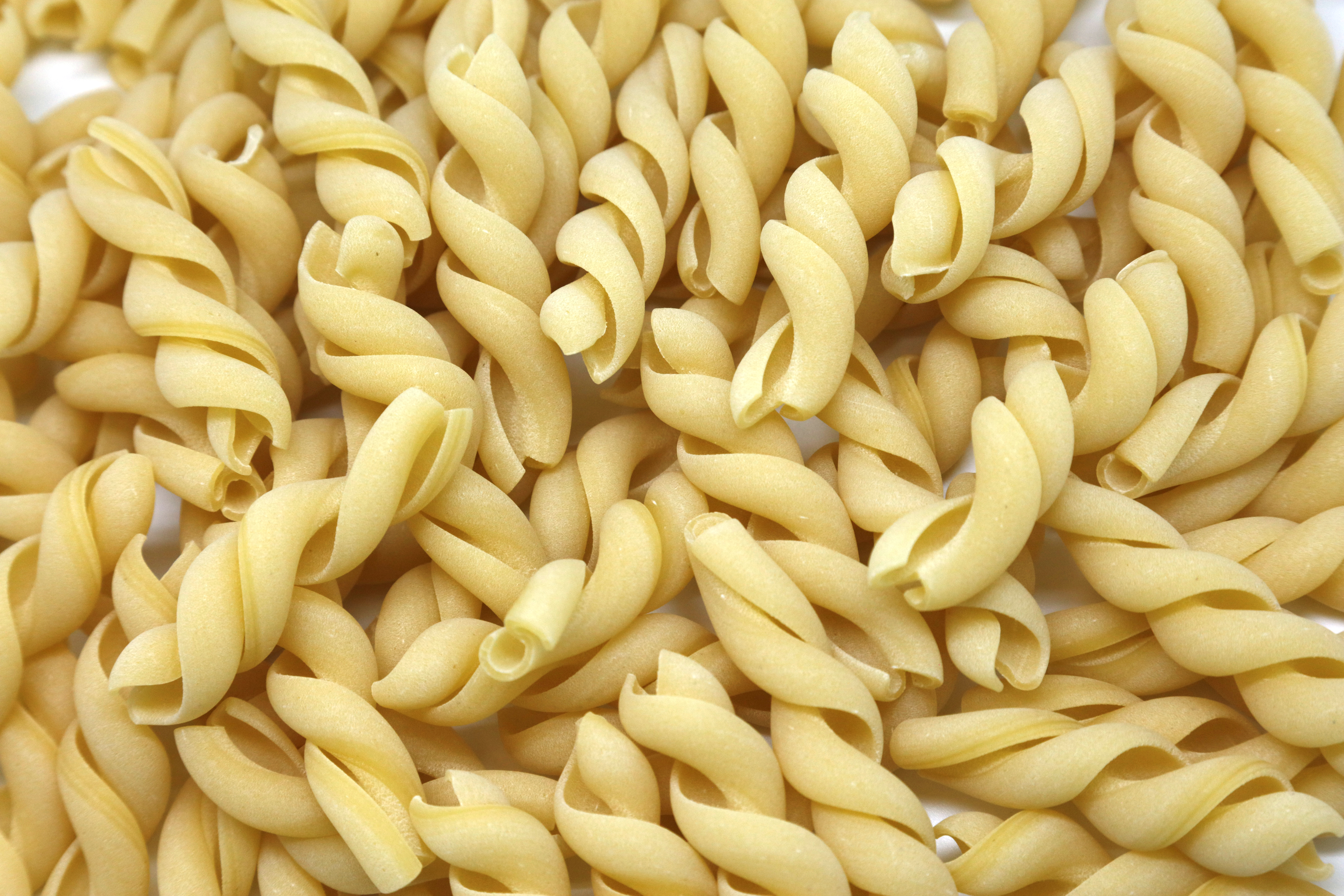
Dry treccioni pasta

Durum wheat (T. d. durum) is the 10th-most cultivated cereal worldwide, with a total production of around 38 million tons.

Most of the durum grown today is amber durum, the grains of which are amber-colored due to the extra carotenoid pigments and are larger than those of other types of wheat. Durum has a yellow endosperm, which gives pasta its color. When durum is milled, the endosperm is ground into a granular product called semolina. Semolina made from durum is used for premium pastas and breads. Notably, semolina is also one of the only flours that are purposely oxidized for flavor and color. Red durum is grown for use mostly in livestock feed.

The cultivation of durum generates greater yield than other wheats in areas of low precipitation. Good yields can be obtained by irrigation, but this is rarely done. Durum is one of the most important food crops in West Asia. Although the variety of the wheat there is diverse, it is not extensively grown there, thus it must be imported. West amber durum produced in Canada is used mostly for semolina/pasta, but some is also exported to Italy for bread production.

In the Middle East and North Africa, local bread-making accounts for half the consumption of durum. Some flour is even imported. Many countries in Europe, though, produce durum in commercially significant quantities.

In India, durum accounts for roughly 5% of total wheat production in the country and is used to make products such as rava and sooji.

=== Processing and protein content ===
Durum is subject to four processes: cleaning, tempering, milling, and purifying. First, durum is cleaned to remove foreign material and shrunken and broken kernels. Then, it is tempered to a desired moisture content, toughening the seed coat for efficient separation of bran and endosperm. Durum milling is a complex procedure involving repetitive grinding and sieving. Proper purifying results in maximum semolina yield and the least amount of bran powder.

To produce bread, durum is ground into flour, which is mixed with water to produce dough. The quantities mixed vary, depending on the acidity of the mixture. To produce fluffy bread, the dough is mixed with yeast and lukewarm water, heavily kneaded to form a gas-retaining gluten network, and then fermented for hours, producing CO_{2} bubbles held in the gluten.

The quality of the bread produced depends on the viscoelastic properties of gluten, the protein content, and protein composition. Containing about 12% total protein in defatted flour compared to 11% in common wheat, durum yields 27% extractable, wet gluten compared to 24% in common wheat. Despite its high protein content, durum is not a strong wheat in the sense of giving strength to dough through the formation of a gluten network.
