= List of monocotyledons of Montana =

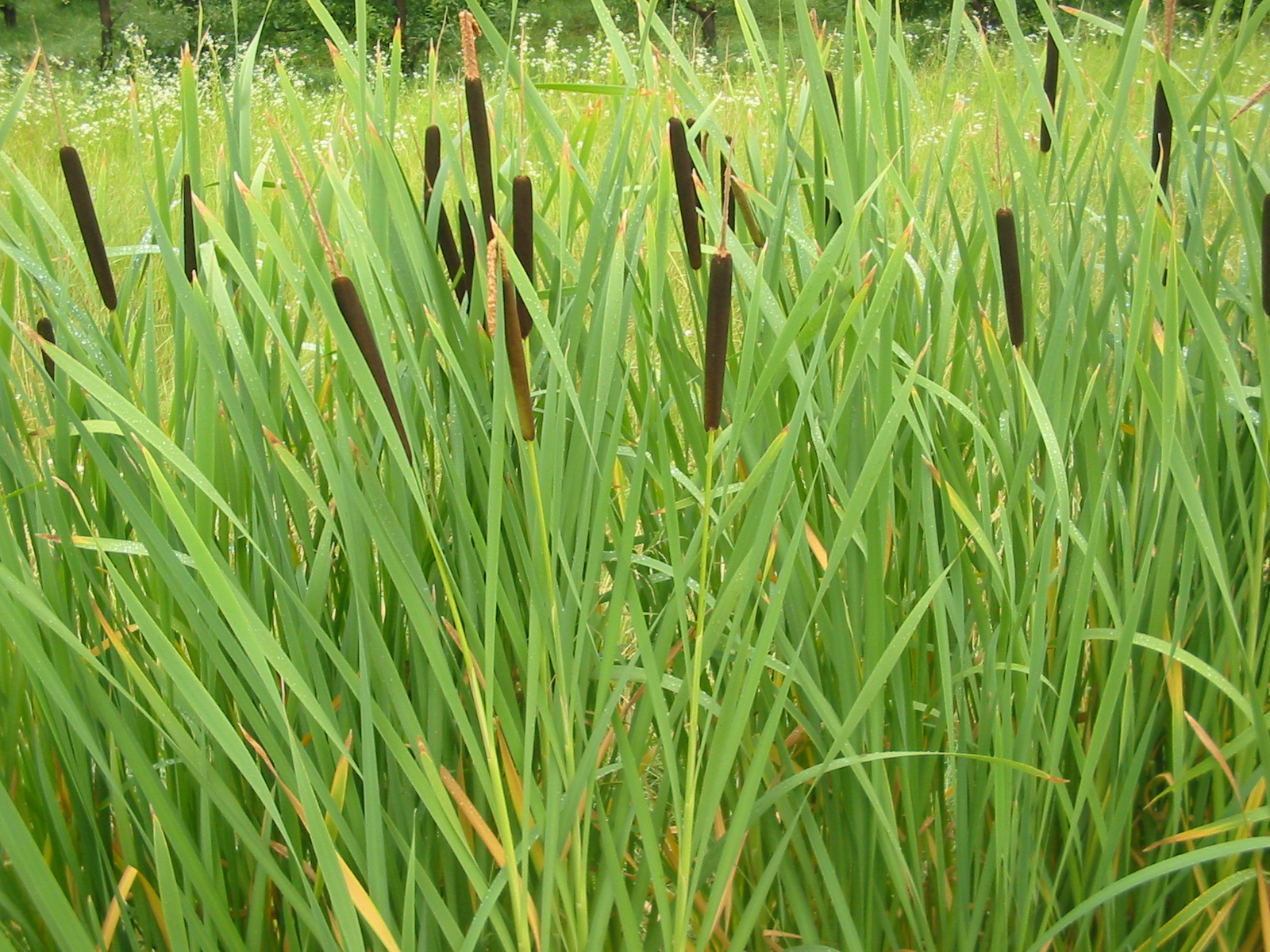
Broadleaf cattail

Monocotyledon species found in Montana number at least 615. The Montana Natural Heritage Program has identified a number of monocot species as Species of Concern.

Monocotyledons are one of two major groups of flowering plants (or angiosperms) that are traditionally recognized, the other being dicotyledons, or dicots. Monocot seedlings typically have one cotyledon (seed-leaf), in contrast to the two cotyledons typical of dicots. Monocots have been recognized at various taxonomic ranks, and under various names (see below). The APG II system recognises a clade called "monocots" but does not assign it to a taxonomic rank. There are between 50,000 and 60,000 species within this group; according to IUCN there are 59,300 species. The largest family in this group (and in the flowering plants as a whole) by number of species are the orchids (family Orchidaceae), with more than 20,000 species. In agriculture the majority of the biomass produced comes from monocots. The true grasses, family Poaceae (Gramineae), are the most economically important family in this group. These include all the true grains (rice, wheat, maize, etc.), the pasture grasses, sugar cane, and the bamboos. True grasses have evolved to become highly specialised for wind pollination. Grasses produce much smaller flowers, which are gathered in highly visible plumes (inflorescences). Other economically important monocot families are the palm family (Arecaceae), banana family (Musaceae), ginger family (Zingiberaceae) and the onion family Alliaceae, which includes such ubiquitously used vegetables as onions and garlic.

== Arrow-grass family ==
Order: Najadales, family: Juncaginaceae

- Common bog arrow-grass, Triglochin maritima
- Flowering quillwort, Triglochin scilloides
- Slender bog arrow-grass, Triglochin palustris

== Arum family ==
Order: Arales, family: Araceae

- Yellow skunk-cabbage, Lysichiton americanus

== Bur-reeds ==
Order: Typhales, family: Sparganiaceae

- Branching bur-reed, Sparganium androcladum
- Large bur-reed, Sparganium eurycarpum
- Narrowleaf bur-reed, Sparganium angustifolium
- Small bur-reed, Sparganium natans

== Cattails ==
Order: Typhales, family: Typhaceae

- Broadleaf cattail, Typha latifolia
- Narrow-leaved cattail, Typha angustifolia

== Ditch-grass family ==
Order: Najadales, family: Ruppiaceae

- Ditch-grass, Ruppia maritima

== Duckweeds ==
Order: Arales, family: Lemnaceae

- Columbia water-meal, Wolffia columbiana
- Dotted watermeal, Wolffia borealis
- Duck-meal, Spirodela polyrrhiza
- Lesser duckweed, Lemna minor
- Pale duckweed, Lemna valdiviana
- Spotted water-meal, Wolffia brasiliensis
- Star duckweed, Lemna trisulca
- Turion duckweed, Lemna turionifera

== Flowering-rush family ==
Order: Alismatales, family: Butomaceae

- Flowering-rush, Butomus umbellatus

== Grasses ==
Order: Cyperales, family: Poaceae

- Alaskan oniongrass, Melica subulata
- Alkali cordgrass, Spartina gracilis
- Alkali muhly, Muhlenbergia asperifolia
- Alkali sacaton, Sporobolus airoides
- Alpine bluegrass, Poa alpina
- American mannagrass, Glyceria grandis
- American sloughgrass, Beckmannia syzigachne
- Annual bluegrass, Poa annua
- Annual false wheatgrass, Eremopyrum triticeum
- Annual hairgrass, Deschampsia danthonioides
- Annual muhly, Muhlenbergia minutissima
- Arctic bluegrass, Poa arctica
- Awnless wild rye, Elymus submuticus
- Baffin fescue, Festuca baffinensis
- Banff loose-flowered bluegrass, Poa laxa ssp. banffiana
- Barnyard grass, Echinochloa crus-galli
- Basin brome, Bromus polyanthus
- Beardless oats, Trisetum wolfii
- Beardless wild rye, Leymus triticoides
- Bermudagrass, Cynodon dactylon
- Big bluestem, Andropogon gerardii
- Blue grama, Bouteloua gracilis
- Blue wild rye, Elymus glaucus
- Blue-joint reedgrass, Calamagrostis canadensis
- Bluebunch wheatgrass, Pseudoroegneria spicata
- Bog bluegrass, Poa leptocoma
- Boreal mannagrass, Glyceria borealis
- Bottlebrush squirrel-tail, Elymus elymoides
- Bristly bristle grass, Setaria verticillata
- Bristly dogtail grass, Cynosurus echinatus
- Broad-glumed brome, Bromus latiglumis
- Brome fescue, Vulpia bromoides
- Brook grass, Catabrosa aquatica
- Buffalo grass, Bouteloua dactyloides
- Bulbous bluegrass, Poa bulbosa
- California brome, Bromus carinatus
- California oatgrass, Danthonia californica
- Canada bluegrass, Poa compressa
- Canada wild rye, Elymus canadensis
- Cascade reedgrass, Calamagrostis tweedyi
- Cheatgrass, Bromus tectorum
- Chilean brome, Bromus berteroanus
- Colonial bentgrass, Agrostis capillaris
- Columbia needlegrass, Stipa nelsonii ssp. dorei
- Common barley, Hordeum vulgare
- Common canary grass, Phalaris canariensis
- Common hardgrass, Sclerochloa dura
- Common reed, Phragmites australis
- Common velvetgrass, Holcus lanatus
- Contracted Indian ricegrass, Oryzopsis contracta
- Corn brome, Bromus squarrosus
- Creeping foxtail, Alopecurus arundinaceus
- Crested dogtail grass, Cynosurus cristatus
- Crested wheatgrass, Agropyron cristatum
- Cultivated oat, Avena sativa
- Cultivated rye, Secale cereale
- Cultivated wheat, Triticum aestivum
- Cusick's bluegrass, Poa cusickii
- Darnel ryegrass, Lolium temulentum
- Dense pine reedgrass, Calamagrostis koelerioides
- Dense silky bentgrass, Apera interrupta
- Ditch reedgrass, Calamagrostis scopulorum
- Drooping woodreed, Cinna latifolia
- Eastern wild rice, Zizania aquatica
- False buffalograss, Monroa squarrosa
- Few-flowered oatgrass, Danthonia unispicata
- Few-flowered panic-grass, Dichanthelium oligosanthes
- Field brome, Bromus arvensis
- Fowl bluegrass, Poa palustris
- Fowl mannagrass, Glyceria striata
- Fox-tail timothy, Crypsis alopecuroides
- Foxtail barley, Hordeum jubatum
- Foxtail fescue, Vulpia myuros
- Foxtail muhly, Muhlenbergia andina
- Fringed brome, Bromus ciliatus
- Great Basin wild rye, Leymus cinereus
- Green bristle grass, Setaria viridis
- Green needlegrass, Stipa viridula
- Hairy crabgrass, Digitaria sanguinalis
- Ice grass, Phippsia algida
- Idaho bentgrass, Agrostis idahoensis
- Idaho fescue, Festuca idahoensis
- Indian goosegrass, Eleusine indica
- Indian ricegrass, Oryzopsis hymenoides
- Indiangrass, Sorghastrum nutans
- Inland bluegrass, Poa interior
- Intermediate wheatgrass, Thinopyrum intermedium
- Italian foxtail, Setaria italica
- Italian ryegrass, Lolium multiflorum
- Japanese brome, Bromus japonicus
- Johnson grass, Sorghum halepense
- Jointed goatgrass, Aegilops cylindrica
- Kentucky bluegrass, Poa pratensis
- Leafy bentgrass, Agrostis pallens
- Lemmon's alkaligrass, Puccinellia lemmonii
- Lemmon's needlegrass, Stipa lemmonii
- Letterman's bluegrass, Poa lettermanii
- Letterman's needlegrass, Stipa lettermanii
- Little barley, Hordeum pusillum
- Little bluestem, Schizachyrium scoparium
- Little lovegrass, Eragrostis minor
- Little ricegrass, Oryzopsis exigua
- Littleseed ricegrass, Oryzopsis micrantha
- Long-spine sandbur, Cenchrus longispinus
- Marsh muhly, Muhlenbergia racemosa
- Mat muhly, Muhlenbergia richardsonis
- Meadow barley, Hordeum brachyantherum
- Meadow fescue, Festuca pratensis
- Meadow foxtail, Alopecurus geniculatus
- Meadow foxtail, Alopecurus pratensis
- Meadow timothy, Phleum pratense
- Mediterranean or sea barley, Hordeum marinum
- Missoula County oats, Trisetum x orthochaetum
- Montana wheatgrass, Elymus albicans
- Mountain bentgrass, Agrostis humilis
- Mountain fescue, Festuca viridula
- Mountain foxtail, Alopecurus alpinus
- Mountain hairgrass, Vahlodea atropurpurea
- Mountain muhly, Muhlenbergia montana
- Mountain timothy, Phleum alpinum
- Mouse barley, Hordeum murinum
- Mt. Washington bluegrass, Poa laxa
- Muttongrass, Poa fendleriana
- Narrow false oats, Trisetum spicatum
- Narrow-flower bluegrass, Poa stenantha
- Narrow-flowered brome, Bromus vulgaris
- Needle-and-thread, Stipa comata
- Nelson's needlegrass, Stipa nelsonii
- Nevada needlegrass, Stipa nevadensis
- Nodding bluegrass, Poa reflexa
- Nodding fescue, Festuca subulata
- Nodding trisetum, Trisetum canescens
- Northern bentgrass, Agrostis borealis
- Northern fescue, Festuca viviparoidea
- Northern sweet grass, Hierochloe hirta
- Northern wild rye, Leymus innovatus
- Nuttall's alkali grass, Puccinellia nuttalliana
- Oniongrass, Melica bulbosa
- Orchard grass, Dactylis glomerata
- Oregon bentgrass, Agrostis oregonensis
- Pale manna grass, Puccinellia pauciflora
- Panic grass, Dichanthelium acuminatum
- Parry's oatgrass, Danthonia parryi
- Patterson's bluegrass, Poa abbreviata ssp. pattersonii
- Perennial ryegrass, Lolium perenne
- Persian ryegrass, Lolium persicum
- Pineforest needlegrass, Stipa pinetorum
- Pinegrass, Calamagrostis rubescens
- Plains muhly, Muhlenbergia cuspidata
- Plains reedgrass, Calamagrostis montanensis
- Plains rough fescue, Festuca hallii
- Porcupine needlegrass, Stipa spartea
- Porter's brome, Bromus porteri
- Poverty oatgrass, Danthonia spicata
- Prairie bluegrass, Poa arida
- Prairie cordgrass, Spartina pectinata
- Prairie dropseed, Sporobolus heterolepis
- Prairie junegrass, Koeleria macrantha
- Prairie sandreed, Calamovilfa longifolia
- Prairie wedgegrass, Sphenopholis obtusata
- Proso millet, Panicum miliaceum
- Pullup muhly, Muhlenbergia filiformis
- Pumpelly's brome, Bromus inermis ssp. pumpellianus
- Purple lovegrass, Eragrostis pectinacea
- Purple oat, Schizachne purpurascens
- Purple reedgrass, Calamagrostis purpurascens
- Purple three-awn grass, Aristida purpurea
- Quackgrass, Elymus repens
- Rabbit's-foot grass, Polypogon monspeliensis
- Rattlesnake brome, Bromus briziformis
- Red fescue, Festuca rubra
- Redtop, Agrostis stolonifera
- Reed canary grass, Phalaris arundinacea
- Rice cutgrass, Leersia oryzoides
- Richardson's needlegrass, Stipa richardsonii
- Rocky Mountain fescue, Festuca saximontana
- Rough barnyard grass, Echinochloa muricata
- Rough bentgrass, Agrostis scabra
- Rough bluegrass, Poa trivialis
- Rough fescue, Festuca scabrella
- Roughleaf ricegrass, Oryzopsis asperifolia
- Russian wild rye, Psathyrostachys juncea
- Rye brome, Bromus secalinus
- Saltgrass, Distichlis spicata
- Sand bluestem, Andropogon hallii
- Sand dropseed, Sporobolus cryptandrus
- Sand wild rye, Leymus flavescens
- Sandberg bluegrass, Poa secunda
- Scribner's panic grass, Dichanthelium oligosanthes var. scribnerianum
- Scribner's wild rye, Elymus scribneri
- Sheathed dropseed, Sporobolus vaginiflorus
- Sheep fescue, Festuca ovina
- Short-awn foxtail, Alopecurus aequalis
- Short-leaved bluegrass, Poa arnowiae
- Shortleaf fescue, Festuca brachyphylla
- Showy oniongrass, Melica spectabilis
- Side-oats grama, Bouteloua curtipendula
- Six-weeks grama, Bouteloua barbata
- Six-weeks fescue, Vulpia octoflora
- Slender hairgrass, Deschampsia elongata
- Slender oat, Avena barbata
- Slender wedgegrass, Sphenopholis intermedia
- Slender wheatgrass, Elymus trachycaulus
- Slimstem reedgrass, Calamagrostis stricta
- Small dropseed, Sporobolus neglectus
- Small six-weeks fescue, Vulpia microstachys
- Smallflower fescue, Festuca minutiflora
- Smith's melicgrass, Melica smithii
- Smooth brome, Bromus inermis ssp. inermis
- Smooth crabgrass, Digitaria ischaemum
- Soft brome, Bromus hordeaceus
- Spike bentgrass, Agrostis exarata
- Spike fescue, Leucopoa kingii
- Spike muhly, Muhlenbergia glomerata
- Spike-oat, Helictotrichon hookeri
- Spiked brome, Bromus racemosus
- Sprangletop, Leptochloa fusca
- Sprangletop, Scolochloa festucacea
- Spreading alkali grass, Puccinellia distans
- Stinkgrass, Eragrostis cilianensis
- Stout wood reed-grass, Cinna arundinacea
- Sweet vernalgrass, Anthoxanthum odoratum
- Switchgrass, Panicum virgatum
- Tall dropseed, Sporobolus compositus
- Tall fescue, Festuca arundinacea
- Tall mannagrass, Glyceria elata
- Tall oatgrass, Arrhenatherum elatius
- Tall trisetum, Trisetum cernuum
- Teal lovegrass, Eragrostis hypnoides
- Thickspike wheatgrass, Elymus lanceolatus
- Thurber's bentgrass, Agrostis thurberiana
- Thurber's needlegrass, Stipa thurberiana
- Timber oatgrass, Danthonia intermedia
- Tufted foxtail, Alopecurus carolinianus
- Tufted hairgrass, Deschampsia cespitosa
- Tumble grass, Schedonnardus paniculatus
- Variable bentgrass, Agrostis variabilis
- Virginia wild rye, Elymus virginicus
- Western fescue, Festuca occidentalis
- Western needlegrass, Stipa occidentalis
- Western porcupine grass, Stipa curtiseta
- Western wheatgrass, Pascopyrum smithii
- Wheeler's bluegrass, Poa wheeleri
- White bluegrass, Poa glauca
- Wilcox's panic grass, Dichanthelium wilcoxianum
- Wild oats, Avena fatua
- Wirestem muhly, Muhlenbergia mexicana
- Witch panicgrass, Panicum capillare
- Yellow bluestem, Bothriochloa ischaemum
- Yellow foxtail, Setaria pumila

== Greenbriars ==
Order: Liliales, family: Smilacaceae

- Herbaceous greenbrier, Smilax lasioneura

== Horned pondweeds ==
Order: Najadales, family: Zannichelliaceae

- Horned pondweed, Zannichellia palustris

== Irises ==
Order: Liliales, family: Iridaceae

- Idaho blue-eyed-grass, Sisyrinchium idahoense
- Northern blue-eyed-grass, Sisyrinchium septentrionale
- Strict blue-eyed-grass, Sisyrinchium montanum
- Western blue iris, Iris missouriensis
- Western blue-eyed-grass, Sisyrinchium halophilum
- Yellow iris, Iris pseudacorus

== Lilies ==
Order: Liliales, family: Liliaceae

- American false-hellebore, Veratrum viride
- Baker mariposa lily, Calochortus apiculatus
- Beargrass, Xerophyllum tenax
- Big-pod mariposa lily, Calochortus eurycarpus
- Brandegee's onion, Allium brandegeei
- Bruneau mariposa lily, Calochortus bruneaunis
- California false-hellebore, Veratrum californicum
- Chives, Allium schoenoprasum
- Chocolate lily, Fritillaria atropurpurea
- Clasping twisted-stalk, Streptopus amplexifolius
- Columbia lily, Lilium columbianum
- Columbia onion, Allium columbianum
- Common alpine-lily, Lloydia serotina
- Common camas, Camassia quamash
- Dwarf onion, Allium simillimum
- Elegant mariposa lily, Calochortus elegans
- False Solomon's-seal, Maianthemum racemosum
- Foothill death camas, Zigadenus paniculatus
- Fringed onion, Allium fibrillum
- Garden asparagus, Asparagus officinalis
- Geyer's bulbil onion, Allium geyeri var. tenerum
- Geyer's onion, Allium geyeri
- Glacier lily, Erythronium grandiflorum
- Green-band mariposa lily, Calochortus macrocarpus
- Gunnison's mariposa lily, Calochortus gunnisonii
- Hooker's fairybells, Prosartes hookeri
- Large-flower triteleia, Triteleia grandiflora
- Meadow death camas, Zigadenus venenosus
- Meadow onion, Allium canadense
- Mountain death camas, Zigadenus elegans
- Mountain star-lily, Leucocrinum montanum
- Nodding onion, Allium cernuum
- Nuttall's mariposa lily, Calochortus nuttallii
- Orange daylily, Hemerocallis fulva
- Queencup bead lily, Clintonia uniflora
- Rosy twisted-stalk, Streptopus lanceolatus
- Rough-fruited fairybells, Prosartes trachycarpa
- Short-stem onion, Allium brevistylum
- Small onion, Allium parvum
- Small tofieldia, Tofieldia pusilla
- Starry false Solomon's-seal, Maianthemum stellatum
- Tapertip onion, Allium acuminatum
- Three-leaf false Solomon's-seal, Maianthemum trifolium
- Western false asphodel, Triantha occidentalis
- Western featherbells, Stenanthium occidentale
- Western trillium, Trillium ovatum
- White glacier lily, Erythronium grandiflorum var. candidum
- White wild onion, Allium textile
- Wild lily-of-the-valley, Maianthemum canadense
- Wood lily, Lilium philadelphicum
- Yellowbells, Fritillaria pudica

== Orchids ==
Order: Orchidales, family: Orchidaceae

- Alaska rein orchid, Piperia unalascensis
- Broad-leaved twayblade, Neottia convallarioides
- Clustered lady's-slipper, Cypripedium fasciculatum
- Early coralroot, Corallorhiza trifida
- Eastern helleborine, Epipactis helleborine
- Fairy slipper, Calypso bulbosa
- Giant helleborine, Epipactis gigantea
- Giant rattlesnake-plantain, Goodyera oblongifolia
- Heartleaf twayblade, Neottia cordata
- Hillside rein orchid, Piperia elegans
- Hooded ladies'-tresses, Spiranthes romanzoffiana
- Huron green orchid, Platanthera huronensis
- Hybrid lady's-slipper, Cypripedium x columbianum
- Large roundleaf orchid, Platanthera orbiculata
- Loesel's twayblade, Liparis loeselii
- Long-bract green orchis, Coeloglossum viride
- Mertens' coralroot, Corallorhiza mertensiana
- Mountain lady's-slipper, Cypripedium montanum
- Northern green orchid, Platanthera aquilonis
- Northern rattlesnake-plantain, Goodyera repens
- Northern twayblade, Neottia borealis
- Round-leaved orchis, Amerorchis rotundifolia
- Slender bog orchid, Platanthera stricta
- Small northern bog orchid, Platanthera obtusata
- Small yellow lady's-slipper, Cypripedium parviflorum
- Sparrow's-egg lady's-slipper, Cypripedium passerinum
- Spotted coralroot, Corallorhiza maculata
- Spring coralroot, Corallorhiza wisteriana
- Striped coralroot, Corallorhiza striata
- Ute ladies'-tresses, Spiranthes diluvialis
- Western twayblade, Neottia banksiana
- White bog orchid, Platanthera dilatata

== Pod-grasses ==
Order: Najadales, family: Scheuchzeriaceae

- Pod grass, Scheuchzeria palustris

== Pondweeds ==
Order: Najadales, family: Potamogetonaceae

- Blunt-leaved pondweed, Potamogeton obtusifolius
- Curly pondweed, Potamogeton crispus
- Flatleaf pondweed, Potamogeton robbinsii
- Flatstem pondweed, Potamogeton compressus
- Floating pondweed, Potamogeton natans
- Fries' pondweed, Potamogeton friesii
- Grassy pondweed, Potamogeton gramineus
- Illinois pondweed, Potamogeton illinoensis
- Largeleaf pondweed, Potamogeton amplifolius
- Leafy pondweed, Potamogeton foliosus
- Longleaf pondweed, Potamogeton nodosus
- Northern pondweed, Potamogeton alpinus
- Nuttall's pondweed, Potamogeton epihydrus
- Richardson's pondweed, Potamogeton richardsonii
- Sago pondweed, Stuckenia pectinata
- Sheathed pondweed, Stuckenia vaginata
- Slender pondweed, Stuckenia filiformis
- Slender pondweed, Potamogeton pusillus
- Straightleaf pondweed, Potamogeton strictifolius
- Water-thread pondweed, Potamogeton diversifolius
- White-stem pondweed, Potamogeton praelongus

== Rushes ==
Order: Juncales, family: Juncaceae

- Baltic rush, Juncus balticus
- Black-grass rush, Juncus gerardii
- Chestnut rush, Juncus castaneus
- Colorado rush, Juncus confusus
- Common woodrush, Luzula multiflora
- Coville's rush, Juncus covillei
- Curved woodrush, Luzula arcuata
- Drummond's rush, Juncus drummondii
- Dudley's rush, Juncus dudleyi
- Flattened rush, Juncus compressus
- Forked woodrush, Luzula divaricata
- Hall's rush, Juncus hallii
- Inland rush, Juncus interior
- Jointed rush, Juncus articulatus
- Knotted rush, Juncus nodosus
- Long-styled rush, Juncus longistylis
- Mertens' rush, Juncus mertensianus
- Nevada rush, Juncus nevadensis
- Northern green rush, Juncus alpinoarticulatus
- Parry's rush, Juncus parryi
- Piper's woodrush, Luzula piperi
- Regel's rush, Juncus regelii
- Slender rush, Juncus tenuis
- Small-flower woodrush, Luzula parviflora
- Smooth woodrush, Luzula hitchcockii
- Soft rush, Juncus effusus
- Spiked woodrush, Luzula spicata
- Straight-leaf rush, Juncus orthophyllus
- Tapered rush, Juncus acuminatus
- Thread rush, Juncus filiformis
- Three-flowered rush, Juncus albescens
- Three-flowered rush, Juncus triglumis
- Three-stamened rush, Juncus ensifolius
- Toad rush, Juncus bufonius
- Torrey's rush, Juncus torreyi
- Two-flowered rush, Juncus biglumis
- Vasey's rush, Juncus vaseyi

== Sedges ==
Order: Cyperales, family: Cyperaceae

- Alpine nerved sedge, Carex neurophora
- Alpine sedge, Carex glacialis
- Arctic hare's-foot sedge, Carex lachenalii
- Awl-fruit sedge, Carex stipata
- Awned sedge, Carex atherodes
- Beaked spikerush, Eleocharis rostellata
- Bearded flatsedge, Cyperus squarrosus
- Beautiful sedge, Carex concinna
- Bebb's sedge, Carex bebbii
- Big-leaf sedge, Carex amplifolia
- Black alpine sedge, Carex nigricans
- Black and purple sedge, Carex luzulina var. atropurpurea
- Black-and-white scale sedge, Carex albonigra
- Black-girdle bulrush, Scirpus atrocinctus
- Blackened sedge, Carex atrosquama
- Blackroot sedge, Carex elynoides
- Blunt sedge, Carex obtusata
- Bolander's sedge, Carex bolanderi
- Bristly sedge, Carex comosa
- Bristly-stalk sedge, Carex leptalea
- Bronze sedge, Carex aenea
- Brownish sedge, Carex brunnescens
- Bulrush sedge, Carex scirpoidea
- Buxbaum's sedge, Carex buxbaumii
- Capitate sedge, Carex capitata
- Clustered field sedge, Carex praegracilis
- Coastal sand sedge, Carex incurviformis
- Columbian sedge, Carex aperta
- Common beaked sedge, Carex utriculata
- Copper-scale sedge, Carex chalciolepis
- Copycat sedge, Carex simulata
- Cordilleran sedge, Carex cordillerana
- Crawe's sedge, Carex crawei
- Crawford's sedge, Carex crawfordii
- Creeping sedge, Carex chordorrhiza
- Creeping spikerush, Eleocharis palustris
- Cusick's sedge, Carex cusickii
- Delicate spikerush, Eleocharis bella
- Different-nerve sedge, Carex epapillosa
- Douglas' sedge, Carex douglasii
- Drummond's halfchaff sedge, Lipocarpha drummondii
- Dry-spike sedge, Carex foenea
- Dusky-seed sedge, Carex pelocarpa
- Ebony sedge, Carex ebenea
- Engelmann's sedge, Carex engelmannii
- Falkland Island sedge, Carex macloviana
- Fescue sedge, Carex brevior
- Few-flower spikerush, Eleocharis quinqueflora
- Few-seeded bog sedge, Carex microglochin
- Fox sedge, Carex vulpinoidea
- Geyer's sedge, Carex geyeri
- Glaucous beaked sedge, Carex rostrata
- Golden-fruit sedge, Carex aurea
- Goose-grass sedge, Carex lenticularis var. dolia
- Goosegrass sedge, Carex eleusinoides
- Green-keeled cottongrass, Eriophorum viridicarinatum
- Hair-like sedge, Carex capillaris
- Hall's sedge, Carex hallii
- Hardstem bulrush, Schoenoplectus acutus
- Hayden's sedge, Carex haydeniana
- Hoary sedge, Carex canescens
- Holm's Rocky Mountain sedge, Carex scopulorum
- Hood's sedge, Carex hoodii
- Hudson's bay bulrush, Trichophorum alpinum
- Idaho sedge, Carex idahoa
- Inflated sedge, Carex vesicaria
- Inland sedge, Carex interior
- Intermediate sedge, Carex media
- Ivory sedge, Carex eburnea
- Jointed-spike sedge, Carex athrostachya
- Jones' sedge, Carex jonesii
- Lake-bank sedge, Carex lacustris
- Large-fruited kobresia, Kobresia sibirica
- Least spikerush, Eleocharis acicularis
- Lesser panicled sedge, Carex diandra
- Liddon sedge, Carex petasata
- Little green sedge, Carex viridula
- Little prickly sedge, Carex echinata
- Long-stolon sedge, Carex inops
- Longbeak sedge, Carex sprengelii
- Many-headed sedge, Carex sychnocephala
- Many-ribbed sedge, Carex multicostata
- Mertens' sedge, Carex mertensii
- Mountain hare sedge, Carex phaeocephala
- Mountain sedge, Carex scopulorum var. bracteosa
- Mt. Shasta sedge, Carex straminiformis
- Mud sedge, Carex limosa
- Nard sedge, Carex nardina
- Narrow sedge, Carex angustata
- Narrowleaf cottongrass, Eriophorum angustifolium
- Nebraska sedge, Carex nebrascensis
- Needleleaf sedge, Carex duriuscula
- Nelson's sedge, Carex nelsonii
- Nevada bulrush, Scirpus nevadensis
- Northern bog sedge, Carex gynocrates
- Northern clustered sedge, Carex arcta
- Northern meadow sedge, Carex praticola
- Northern singlespike sedge, Carex scirpoidea ssp. scirpoidea
- Northwestern sedge, Carex concinnoides
- Northwestern showy sedge, Carex spectabilis
- Ovate spikerush, Eleocharis ovata
- Pacific kobresia, Kobresia myosuroides
- Pale bulrush, Scirpus pallidus
- Pale sedge, Carex livida
- Pale spikerush, Eleocharis flavescens
- Palish sedge, Carex pallescens
- Parry's sedge, Carex parryana
- Payson's sedge, Carex paysonis
- Pendulous bulrush, Scirpus pendulus
- Pointed broom sedge, Carex scoparia
- Poor sedge, Carex magellanica
- Porcupine sedge, Carex hystericina
- Prairie sedge, Carex prairea
- Pregnant sedge, Carex gravida
- Presl sedge, Carex preslii
- Purple spikerush, Eleocharis atropurpurea
- Pyrenean sedge, Carex pyrenaica
- Raynolds' sedge, Carex raynoldsii
- Red-root flatsedge, Cyperus erythrorhizos
- Retrorse sedge, Carex retrorsa
- River bulrush, Schoenoplectus fluviatilis
- Rock sedge, Carex petricosa
- Rock sedge, Carex rupestris
- Rocky Mountain sedge, Carex backii
- Rocky Mountain sedge, Carex saximontana
- Rolland's bulrush, Trichophorum pumilum
- Russet cottongrass, Eriophorum chamissonis
- Russet sedge, Carex saxatilis
- Rusty sedge, Carex subfusca
- Saltmarsh bulrush, Bolboschoenus maritimus
- Sartwell's sedge, Carex sartwellii
- Saw-leaved sedge, Carex scopulorum var. prionophylla
- Scheuchzer cottongrass, Eriophorum scheuchzeri
- Schweinitz' flatsedge, Cyperus schweinitzii
- Sedge (unnamed), Carex diluta
- Sheathed cottongrass, Eriophorum callitrix
- Sheathed sedge, Carex vaginata
- Shining flatsedge, Cyperus bipartitus
- Shore sedge, Carex lenticularis
- Shore sedge, Carex lenticularis var. lipocarpa
- Short sedge, Carex rossii
- Short-leaf sedge, Carex fuliginosa
- Short-pointed flatsedge, Cyperus acuminatus
- Short-scale sedge, Carex deweyana
- Short-scaled sedge, Carex leptopoda
- Short-stalk sedge, Carex podocarpa
- Short-stemmed sedge, Carex deflexa
- Sierran hare sedge, Carex leporinella
- Simple kobresia, Kobresia simpliciuscula
- Slender bulrush, Schoenoplectus heterochaetus
- Slender cottongrass, Eriophorum gracile
- Slender sedge, Carex lasiocarpa
- Slender spikerush, Eleocharis elliptica
- Small-fruit bulrush, Scirpus microcarpus
- Small-head sedge, Carex illota
- Small-wing sedge, Carex microptera
- Small-winged sedge, Carex stenoptila
- Smooth-cone sedge, Carex laeviconica
- Smooth-stem sedge, Carex laeviculmis
- Soft sedge, Carex tenera
- Softleaf sedge, Carex disperma
- Softstem bulrush, Schoenoplectus tabernaemontani
- Steven's Scandinavian sedge, Carex stevenii
- Teacher's sedge, Carex praeceptorum
- Thick-head sedge, Carex pachystachya
- Thin-flowered sedge, Carex tenuiflora
- Thread-leaved sedge, Carex filifolia
- Threadleaf beakseed, Bulbostylis capillaris
- Three-square bulrush, Schoenoplectus americanus
- Three-square bulrush, Schoenoplectus pungens
- Threeway sedge, Dulichium arundinaceum
- Torrey's sedge, Carex torreyi
- Tufted club-rush, Trichophorum cespitosum
- Valley sedge, Carex vallicola
- Water bulrush, Schoenoplectus subterminalis
- Water sedge, Carex aquatilis
- Western sedge, Carex occidentalis
- Western single-spike sedge, Carex scirpoidea ssp. pseudoscirpoidea
- White-scaled sedge, Carex xerantica
- Woodrush sedge, Carex luzulina
- Woodrush sedge, Carex luzulina var. ablata
- Woolgrass, Scirpus cyperinus
- Woolgrass bulrush, Scirpus atrovirens
- Woolly sedge, Carex pellita
- Yellow sedge, Carex flava

== Spiderwort family ==
Order: Commelinales, family: Commelinaceae

- Bracted spiderwort, Tradescantia bracteata
- Prairie spiderwort, Tradescantia occidentalis

== Sweetflag / calamus family ==
Order: Arales, family: Acoraceae

- Sweetflag, Acorus americanus

== Water-hyacinth family ==
Order: Liliales, family: Pontederiaceae

- Water star-grass, Heteranthera dubia

== Water-nymph family ==
Order: Najadales, family: Najadaceae

- Guadalupe water-nymph, Najas guadalupensis
- Slender naiad, Najas flexilis

== Water-plantains ==
Order: Alismatales, family: Alismataceae

- Common arrowhead, Sagittaria latifolia
- Narrow-leaf water-plantain, Alisma gramineum
- Northern arrowhead, Sagittaria cuneata
- Northern water-plantain, Alisma triviale

== Waterweeds ==
Order: Hydrocharitales, family: Hydrocharitaceae

- Broad waterweed, Elodea canadensis
- Long-sheath waterweed, Elodea bifoliata
- Nuttall waterweed, Elodea nuttallii

== Yuccas / agaves ==
Order: Liliales, family: Agavaceae

- Small soapweed yucca, Yucca glauca

== See also ==
- Coniferous plants of Montana
- Lichens of Montana
- Dicotyledons of Montana
