= Achnatherum richardsonii =

Conservation status
- Secure (NatureServe)

Scientific classification
- Kingdom: Plantae
- Clade: Tracheophytes
- Clade: Angiosperms
- Clade: Monocots
- Clade: Commelinids
- Order: Poales
- Family: Poaceae
- Subfamily: Pooideae
- Genus: Achnatherum
- Species: A. richardsonii

Binomial name
- Achnatherum richardsonii (Link) Barkworth

Synonyms
- Stipa richardsonii

Species of flowering plant

Achnatherum richardsonii is a species of grass known by the common names Richardson's needlegrass, spreading needlegrass, and Canada mountain-ricegrass. It is native to northwestern North America, where it is distributed from Alaska and Yukon through the western Canadian provinces south to Colorado.

This is a tufted perennial bunchgrass growing up to a meter tall. The inflorescence is open with spreading branches. The spikelet has a twisted awn up to 2.5 centimeters in length.

This grass grows in several habitat types, including grasslands, meadows, and pine forests. It can be found on moraines, plains, and mountain slopes. It is a dominant or codominant grass species in some areas, such as the western Canadian grasslands and the climax plant communities of Glacier National Park. Plants associated with it include Canada bluegrass (Poa compressa), prairie Junegrass (Koeleria cristata), rough fescue (Festuca altaica), Idaho fescue (F. idahoensis), bearded wheatgrass (Elymus caninus), western needlegrass (Achnatherum occidentalis), timber danthonia (Danthonia intermedia), tufted hairgrass (Deschampsia cespitosa), sedges (Carex spp.), shrubby cinquefoil (Potentilla fruticosa), bearberry (Arctostaphylos uva-ursi), timothy (Phleum pratense), common yarrow (Achillea millefolium), prairiesmoke avens (Geum triflorum), northern bedstraw (Galium boreale), Hood's phlox (Phlox hoodii), and bluebell (Campanula rotundifolia).

This grass is a common food source for livestock and wildlife such as elk and bighorn sheep on the Great Plains. It is preferable when young because as it matures, the fruits become hard and sharp.
