= Arctic brome =

Arctic brome may refer to one, of at least two plants in the genus Bromus:

- Bromus inermis; also called, variously Austrian bromegrass, Awnless brome, Hungarian brome, Hungarian bromegrass, Pumpelly's brome, Russian bromegrass, Smooth brome, and Smooth bromegrass
- Bromus kalmii; also called Prairie brome
