= List of coniferous plants of Montana =

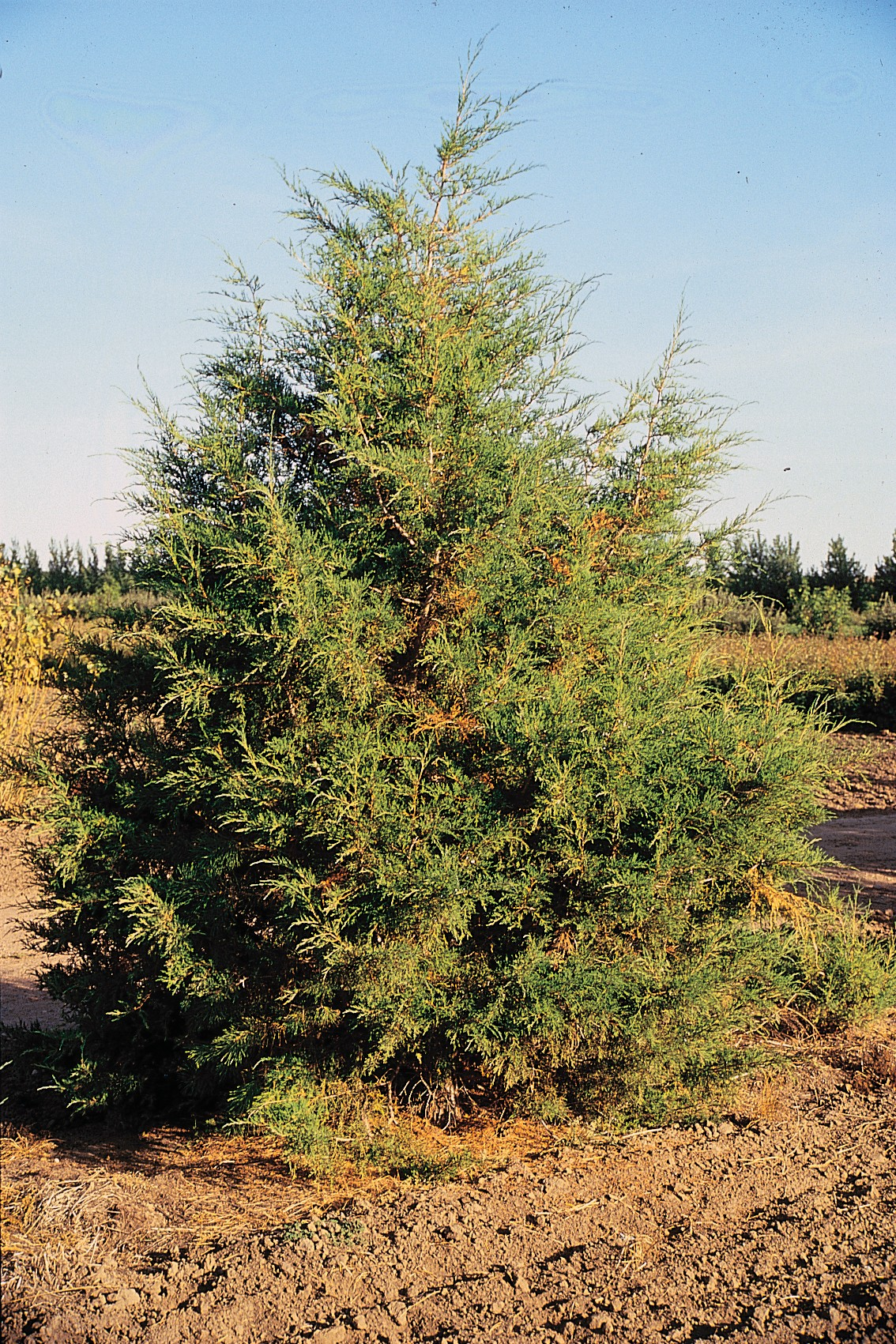
Rocky mountain juniper

There are at least 20 species of Gymnosperms or Coniferous plants in Montana.

The conifers, division Pinophyta, also known as division Coniferophyta or Coniferae, are one of 13 or 14 division level taxa within the Kingdom Plantae. Pinophytes are gymnosperms. They are cone-bearing seed plants with vascular tissue; all extant conifers are woody plants, the great majority being trees with just a few being shrubs. Typical examples of conifers include cedars, Douglas firs, cypresses, firs, junipers, kauris, larches, pines, hemlocks, redwoods, spruces, and yews. The division contains approximately eight families, 68 genera, and 630 living species.

The Ponderosa pine, a conifer, is the Montana State Tree.

== Cedars and junipers ==
Order: Pinales, Family: Cupressaceae

- Common juniper, Juniperus communis
- Creeping juniper, Juniperus horizontalis
- Rocky mountain juniper, Juniperus scopulorum
- Utah juniper, Juniperus osteosperma
- Western redcedar, Thuja plicata

== Fir, hemlock, larch, pine, and spruce ==
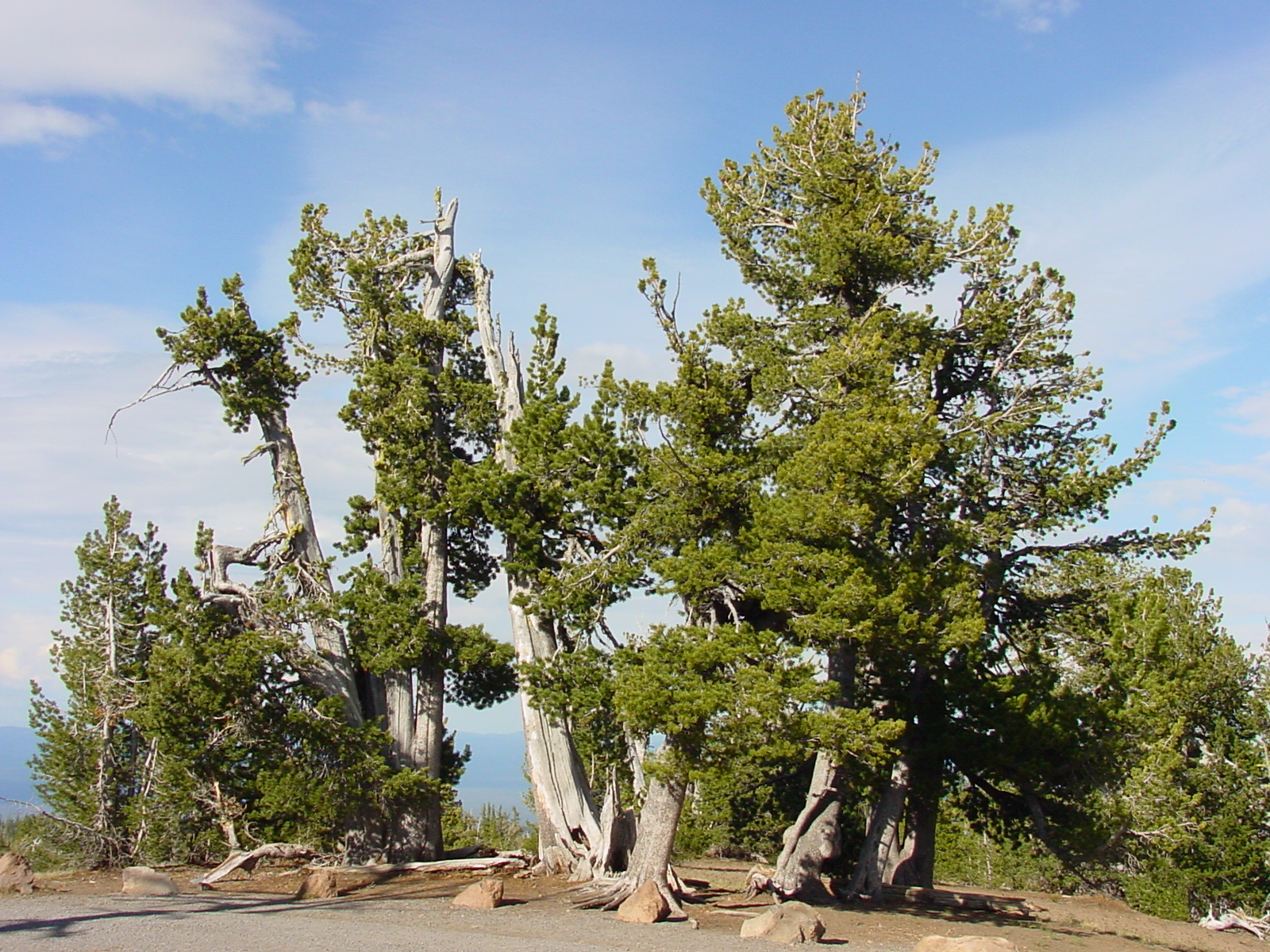
Whitebark pine

Order: Pinales, Family: Pinaceae

- Alpine larch, Larix lyallii
- Douglas fir, Pseudotsuga menziesii
- Engelmann spruce, Picea engelmannii
- Grand fir, Abies grandis
- Limber pine, Pinus flexilis
- Lodgepole pine, Pinus contorta
- Mountain hemlock, Tsuga mertensiana
- Ponderosa pine, Pinus ponderosa
- Subalpine fir, Abies lasiocarpa
- Western hemlock, Tsuga heterophylla
- Western larch, Larix occidentalis
- Western white pine, Pinus monticola
- White spruce, Picea glauca
- Whitebark pine, Pinus albicaulis

== Yew ==
Order: Pinales, Family: Taxaceae

- Pacific yew, Taxus brevifolia

== See also ==
- Ecology of the Rocky Mountains
- Lichens of Montana
- Monocotyledons of Montana
