= List of lichen species of Montana =

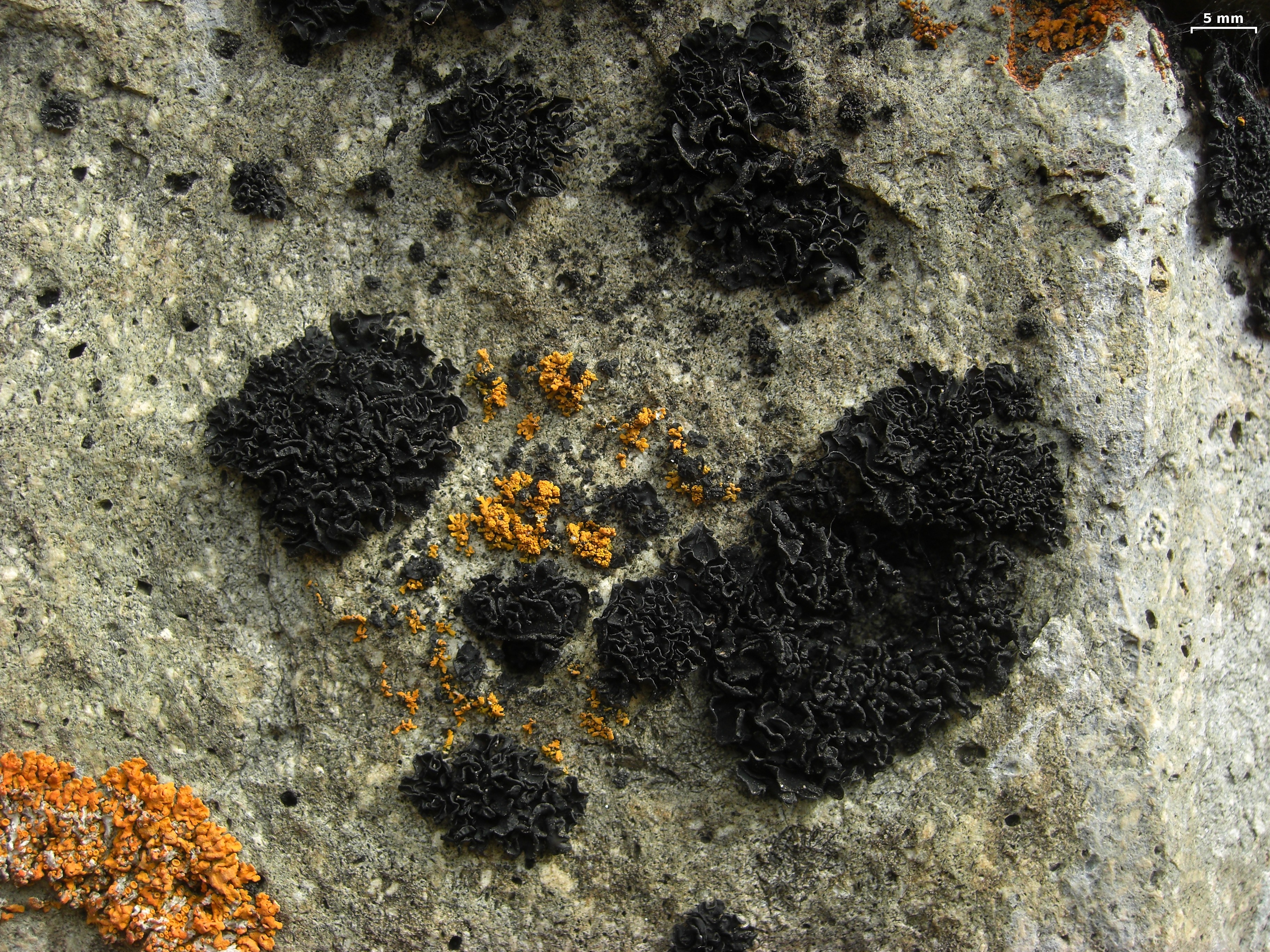
Lichinella nigritella from Bears Paw Mountains, Montana

There are at least 41 species of Lichens, Ascomycota known to exist in Montana. The Montana Natural Heritage Program has identified a number of lichen species as Species of Concern.

The Ascomycota are a Division/Phylum of the kingdom Fungi, and subkingdom Dikarya. Its members are commonly known as the sac fungi. They are the largest phylum of Fungi, with over 64,000 species. The defining feature of this fungal group is the "ascus" (from Greek: ἀσκός (askos), meaning "sac" or "wineskin"), a microscopic sexual structure in which nonmotile spores, called ascospores, are formed. However, some species of the Ascomycota are asexual, meaning that they do not have a sexual cycle and thus do not form asci or ascospores. Previously placed in the Deuteromycota along with asexual species from other fungal taxa, asexual (or anamorphic) ascomycetes are now identified and classified based on morphological or physiological similarities to ascus-bearing taxa, and by phylogenetic analyses of DNA sequences.

- Arctomiaceae
  - Delicate arctomia lichen, Arctomia delicatula
- Brigantiaeaceae
  - Brick-spored firedot lichen, Brigantiaea praetermissa
- Cladoniaceae
  - Thorn cladonia lichen, Cladonia uncialis
  - Wooden soldiers lichen, Cladonia botrytes
- Collemataceae
  - Jelly lichen, Collema curtisporum
- Coniocybaceae
  - Collared glass whiskers lichen, Sclerophora amabilis
- Hymeneliaceae
  - Vagrant aspicilia lichen, Aspicilia fruticulosa
- Lecanoraceae
  - Wanderlust lichen, Rhizoplaca haydenii
- Lobariaceae
  - Cabbage lungwort lichen, Lobaria linita
  - Gray lungwort lichen, Lobaria hallii
  - Netted specklebelly lichen, Pseudocyphellaria anomala
  - Textured lungwort lichen, Lobaria scrobiculata
  - Thorn lichen, Dendriscocaulon umhausense
- Pannariaceae
  - Lead lichen, Parmeliella triptophylla
- Parmeliaceae
  - Camouflage lichen, Melanelia commixta
  - Chestnut wrinkle-lichen, Cetraria sepincola
  - Foxtail lichen, Nodobryoria subdivergens
  - Frosted finger lichen, Dactylina ramulosa
  - Mountain oakmoss lichen, Evernia divaricata
  - Northern camouflage lichen, Melanelia septentrionalis
  - Ribbon rag lichen, Platismatia stenophylla
  - Ring lichen, Arctoparmelia subcentrifuga
  - Shield lichen, Parmelia fraudans
  - Tattered rag lichen, Platismatia herrei
- Peltigeraceae
  - Chocolate chip lichen, Solorina bispora
  - Chocolate chip lichen, Solorina octospora
  - Fringed chocolate chip lichen, Solorina spongiosa
  - Fringed pelt lichen, Peltigera pacifica
  - Waterfan lichen, Peltigera hydrothyria
- Pertusariaceae
  - Wart lichen, Pertusaria diluta
- Physciaceae
  - Shadow lichen, Phaeophyscia kairamoi
- Psoraceae
  - Scale lichen, Psora rubiformis
- Ramalinaceae
  - Hooded ramalina lichen, Ramalina obtusata
  - Powdery twig lichen, Ramalina pollinaria
  - Slit-rimmed ramalina lichen, Ramalina subleptocarpha
- Sphaerophoraceae
  - Coral lichen, Sphaerophorus tuckermanii
- Stereocaulaceae
  - Easter lichen, Stereocaulon paschale
- Umbilicariaceae
  - Rock tripe lichen, Umbilicaria havaasii
  - Rock tripe lichen, Umbilicaria hirsuta
- Verrucariaceae
  - Elf-ear lichen, Normandina pulchella
  - Speck lichen, Verrucaria kootenaica

== See also ==
- Ethnolichenology
- Lichenometry
- Lichenology
- Coniferous plants of Montana
- Monocotyledons of Montana
