= Marsh muhly =

Marsh muhly is a common name for several plants native to North America and may refer to:

- Muhlenbergia glomerata
- Muhlenbergia racemosa
