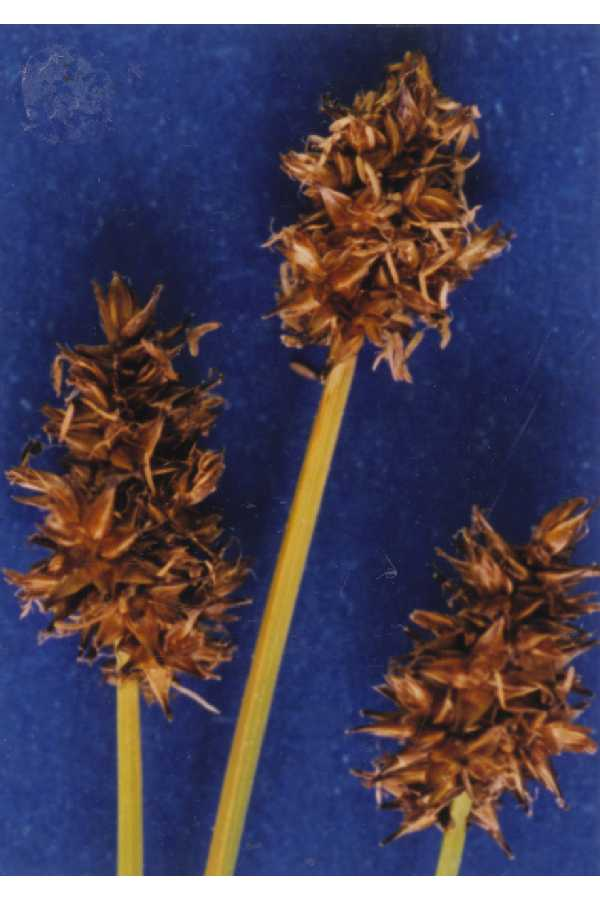

Scientific classification
- Kingdom: Plantae
- Clade: Tracheophytes
- Clade: Angiosperms
- Clade: Monocots
- Clade: Commelinids
- Order: Poales
- Family: Cyperaceae
- Genus: Carex
- Species: C. jonesii

Binomial name
- Carex jonesii L.H.Bailey

= Carex jonesii =

Species of grass-like plant

Carex jonesii is a species of sedge known by the common name Jones' sedge. It is native to the Western United States and grows in moist habitats.

== Description ==
Carex jonesii produces clumps of stems up to about 60 centimeters tall, surrounded by scraps of the previous year's herbage tangled with tufts of new leaves. The dense inflorescence is one or two centimeters long, containing tangles of gold and black scaled flowers.

== Distribution and habitat ==
This sedge is native to the Western United States from California to Montana to Colorado, where it grows in moist areas, especially in subalpine mountain habitat.
