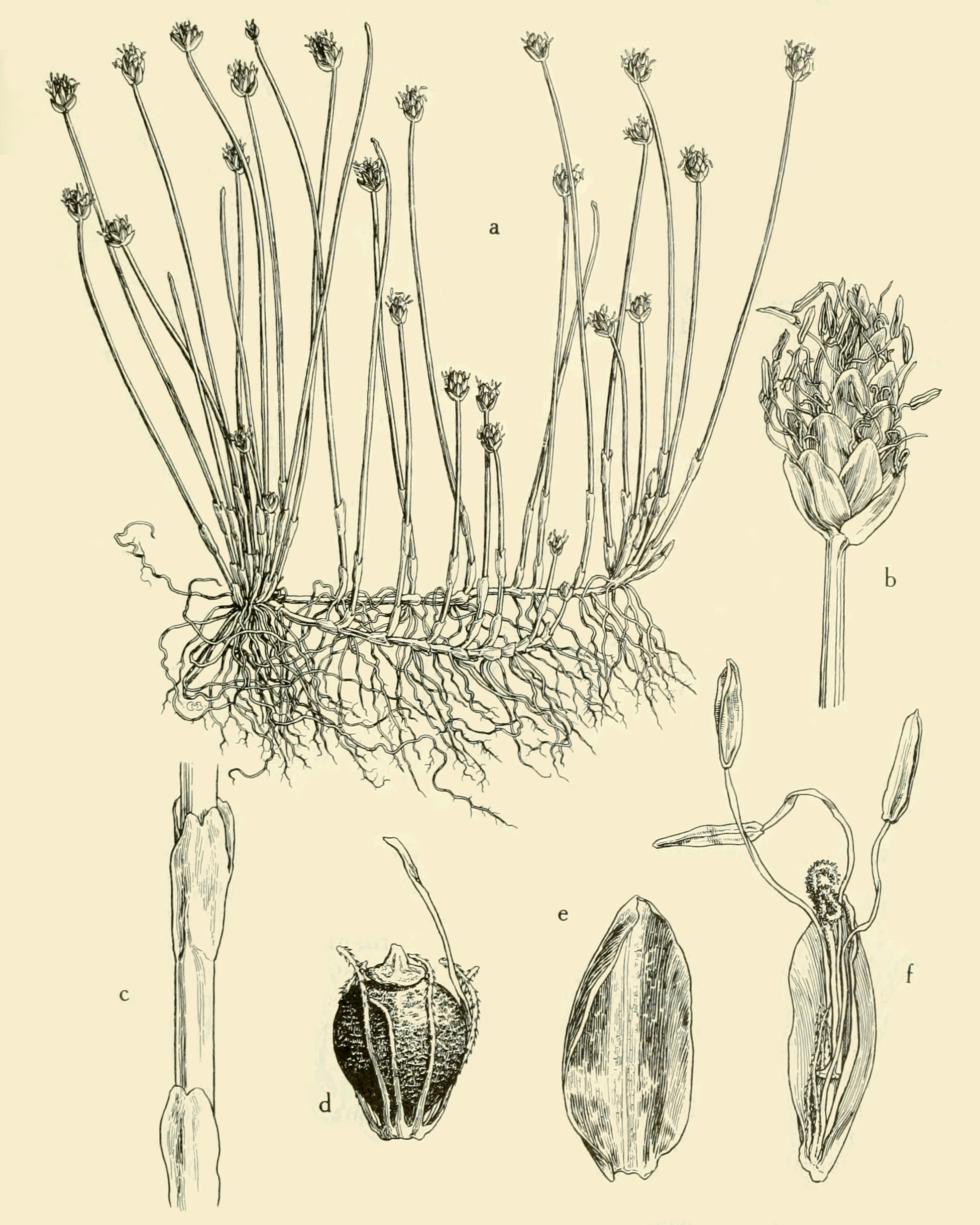

Scientific classification
- Kingdom: Plantae
- Clade: Tracheophytes
- Clade: Angiosperms
- Clade: Monocots
- Clade: Commelinids
- Order: Poales
- Family: Cyperaceae
- Genus: Eleocharis
- Species: E. flavescens

Binomial name
- Eleocharis flavescens (Poir.) Urb.

Synonyms
- List: Baeothryon flavescens (Poir.) A.Dietr.; Eleocharis albivaginata Boeck.; Eleocharis albivaginata var. humilis Boeck.; Eleocharis albovaginata Boeckeler; Eleocharis albovaginata var. flaccida Boeckeler; Eleocharis albovaginata var. humilis Boeckeler; Eleocharis albovaginata var. macrostachya Boeckeler; Eleocharis albovaginata var. stricta Boeckeler; Eleocharis albovaginata var. tenuis Boeckeler; Eleocharis arechavaletae Boeckeler; Eleocharis biocreata Nees; Eleocharis dussiana Boeckeler; Eleocharis flaccida (Rchb. ex A.Spreng.) Urb.; Eleocharis flaccida var. arechavaletae Osten; Eleocharis flaccida var. capitata H.Pfeiff.; Eleocharis flaccida var. fuscescens Kük.; Eleocharis flaccida var. humilis Kük. ex Osten; Eleocharis flaccida var. macrostachya Osten; Eleocharis flaccida var. olivacea Fernald & Griscom; Eleocharis flavescens var. dussiana (Boeckeler) Stehlé; Eleocharis flavescens var. flavescens; Eleocharis flavescens var. fuscescens (Kük.) Svenson; Eleocharis flavescens var. thermalis (Rydb.) Cronquist; Eleocharis ochreata (Nees) Steud.; Eleocharis ochreata var. flaccida (Rchb. ex A.Spreng.) Boeckeler; Eleocharis polymorpha Nees; Eleocharis praticola Britton; Eleocharis sulciculmis Rchb. ex Kunth; Eleocharis thermalis Rydb.; Eleogenus ochreatus Nees; Eleogenus ochreatus var. flaccidus Nees; Eleogenus ochreatus var. minor Nees; Scirpus alboater Schrad. ex Nees; Scirpus albovaginatus (Boeckeler) Kuntze; Scirpus anisochaetus C.Wright; Scirpus caribaeus Griseb.; Scirpus flaccidus Rchb. ex A.Spreng.; Scirpus flavescens Poir.; Scirpus gaudichaudianus Kunth; Scirpus melanospermus Salzm. ex Steud.; Scirpus ochreatus (Nees) Griseb.; Scirpus palmaris Willd. ex Kunth; Trichophyllum ochreatum (Nees) House; Trichophyllum praticola (Britton) House; Trichophyllum thermale (Rydb.) House

= Eleocharis flavescens =

Bright Green Spikerush

Species of spikerush

Eleocharis flavescens is a perennial flowering plant species called bright green spikerush, pale spike-rush, or wrinkle-sheathed spike-rush; it is a member of the sedge family, Cyperaceae. It is a clump-forming species that also spreads into colonies. The plants are small and look very similar to other Spikerush species. It is native to temperate North America, the West Indies, and South America.

== Habitat ==
Eleocharis flavescens is strictly a wetland species found in bogs, brackish or salt marshes and flats, floodplain, marshes, shores of rivers or lakes.

== Varieties ==
There are two varieties.

Eleocharis flavescens var. olivacea (Torr.) Gleason: is found along shorelines in eastern North America along the Atlantic coast and inland south of the Great Lakes to Minnesota. It is a short caespitose plant with biconvex, green to dark brown, achenes. The achenes have a two-cleft style and bristles that are as long or longer than the achene. The scales of the achene are rounded with round tips and have a green midrib. In Minnesota it reaches its most westerly distribution and it is listed as a Threatened species because of its rarity. It is a wetland species found in only a few locations in Minnesota but this may be due to under collecting because the species is small and looks like other species. In Minnesota it has been found growing on a mucky lakeshore, in a mixed forest, and along a muddy shoreline of a peat pond.

Eleocharis flavescens var. flavescens: with red-brown to dark brown ripe achenes. It grows in southern and western USA, the West Indies, and South America.

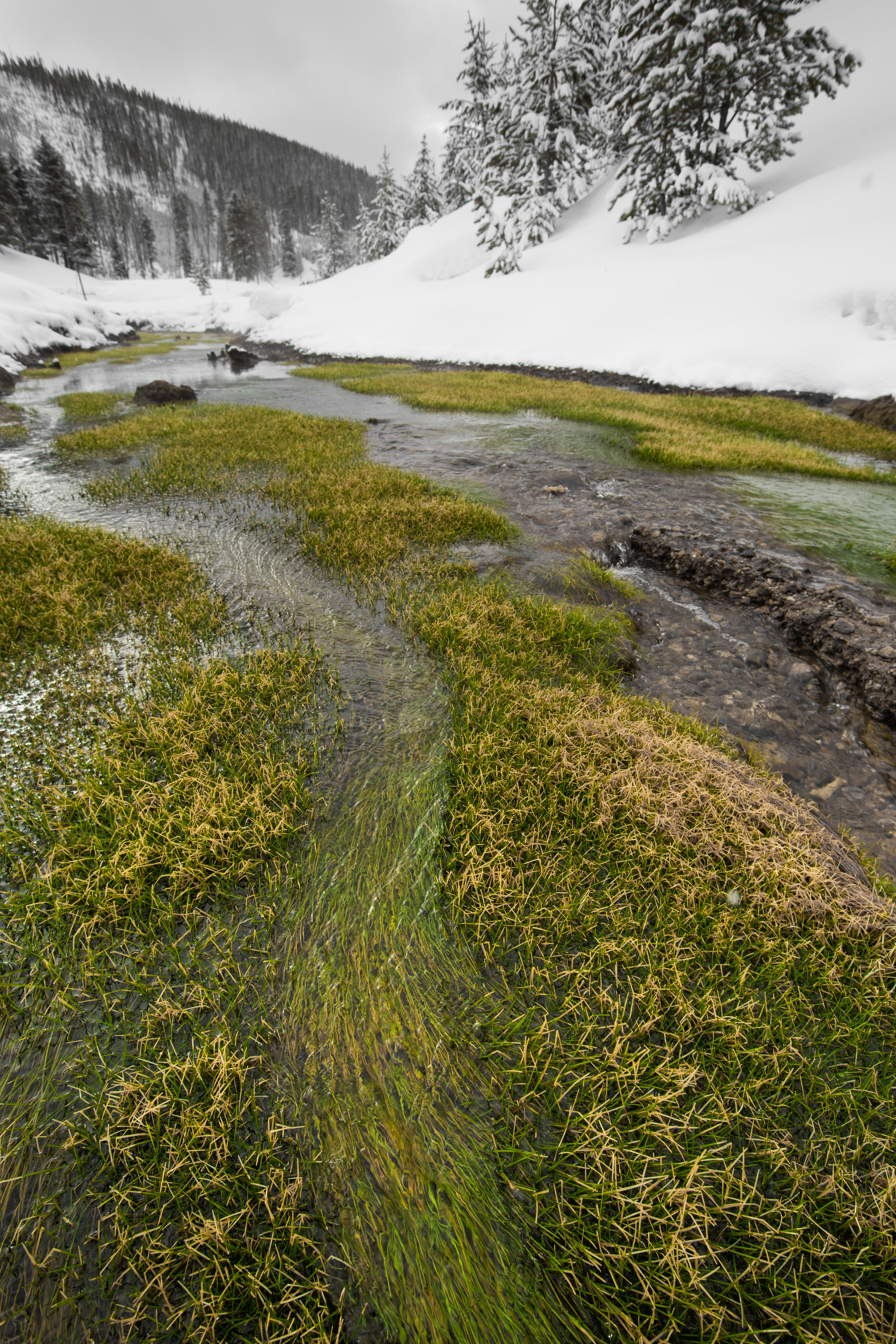
Warm springs spike-rush (Eleocharis flavescens var. thermalis) (13822702854)
