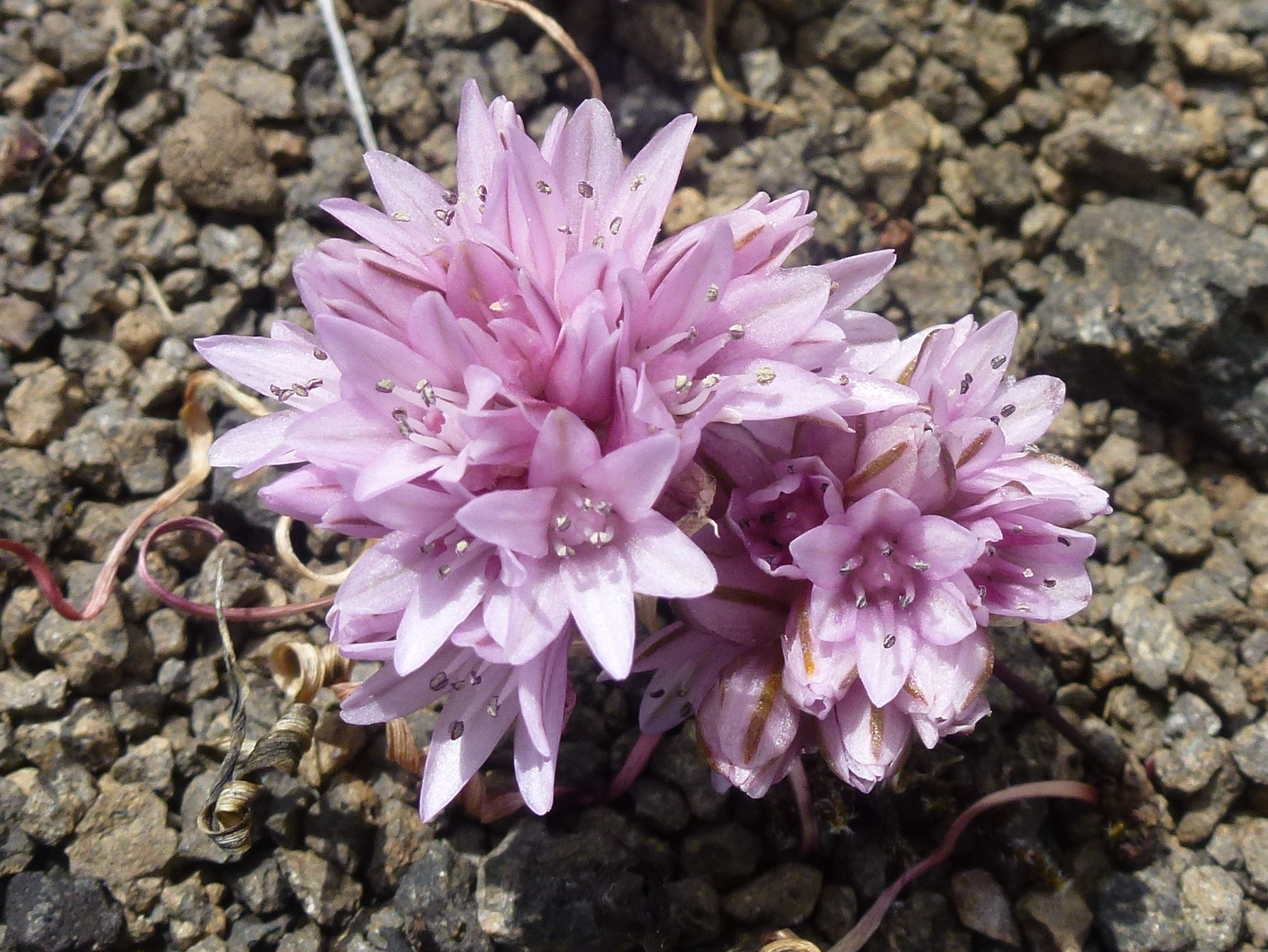

Scientific classification
- Kingdom: Plantae
- Clade: Tracheophytes
- Clade: Angiosperms
- Clade: Monocots
- Order: Asparagales
- Family: Amaryllidaceae
- Subfamily: Allioideae
- Genus: Allium
- Species: A. parvum

Binomial name
- Allium parvum Kellogg

Synonyms
- Allium modocense Jeps.; Allium pleianthum var. particolor M.E.Jones; Allium tribracteatum var. andersonii S.Watson; Allium tribracteatum var. parvum (Kellogg) Jeps.

= Allium parvum =

Small onion

Species of flowering plant

Allium parvum is an American species of wild onion known by the common name small onion. It is native to the western United States where it is a common member of the flora in rocky, dry areas in mountainous areas, especially in talus at elevations of 1,200–2,800 m (3,900–9,200 ft). It is widespread in California, Nevada, Oregon and Idaho, and also reported from western Utah and from extreme southwestern Montana (Ravalli and Beaverhead Counties).

Allium parvum has a bulb one to two and a half centimeters wide and bears a relatively short scape for an onion species, rarely more than 12 centimeters tall. The two leaves are sickle-shaped. Atop the stem is an umbel of fewer than 30 flowers, which are generally pale pink with prominent dark midveins. Anthers are purple or yellow; pollen yellow.

== Uses ==
This plant was a food and flavoring for the Paiute people.
