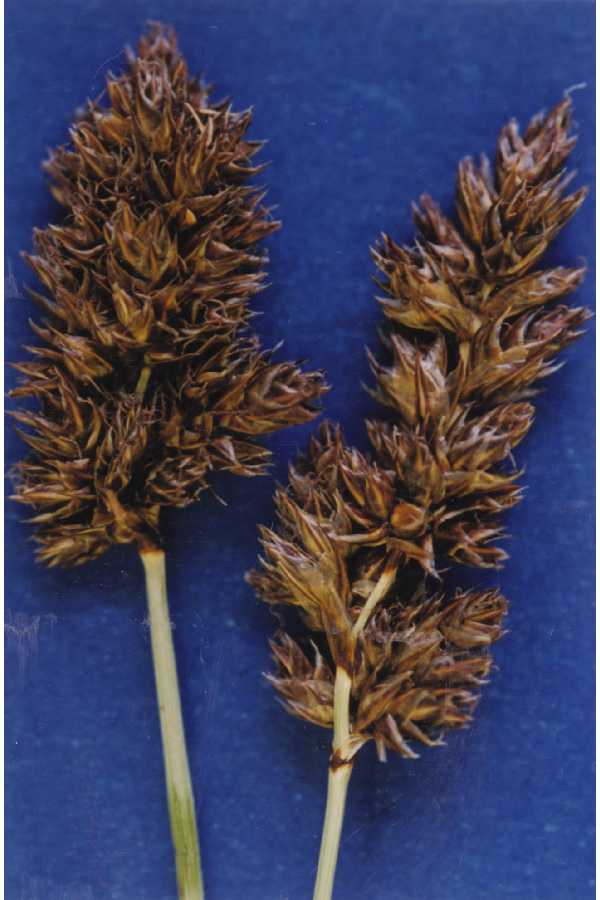

Conservation status
- Least Concern (IUCN 3.1)

Scientific classification
- Kingdom: Plantae
- Clade: Embryophytes
- Clade: Tracheophytes
- Clade: Spermatophytes
- Clade: Angiosperms
- Clade: Monocots
- Clade: Commelinids
- Order: Poales
- Family: Cyperaceae
- Genus: Carex
- Species: C. simulata

Binomial name
- Carex simulata Mack.

= Carex simulata =

Species of grass-like plant

Carex simulata is a species of sedge known by the common name analogue sedge.

== Description ==
Carex simulata produces sharply triangular stems up to 80 centimeters tall from a long, coarse, dark brown rhizome. The inflorescence is dense and rounded to open and long, containing several flower spikes.

The plant is generally dioecious, with individual plants bearing male or female flowers, but not both. The male, staminate inflorescence is usually longer and more narrow than the oval-shaped female, pistillate spike. Female flowers bear fruits which are coated in dark brown, shiny, pointed perigynia.

== Distribution and habitat ==
This sedge is native to the western United States and western Canada, where it grows in many types of wet habitat, from mountain meadows to ditches, often in alkaline conditions. In Canada it is native to British Columbia, Alberta, and Saskatchewan. South of the boarder it grows in all the northwestern states and as far east as North Dakota. In the southwestern US it is not found in Nevada, but is otherwise widespread and grows as far east as New Mexico.
