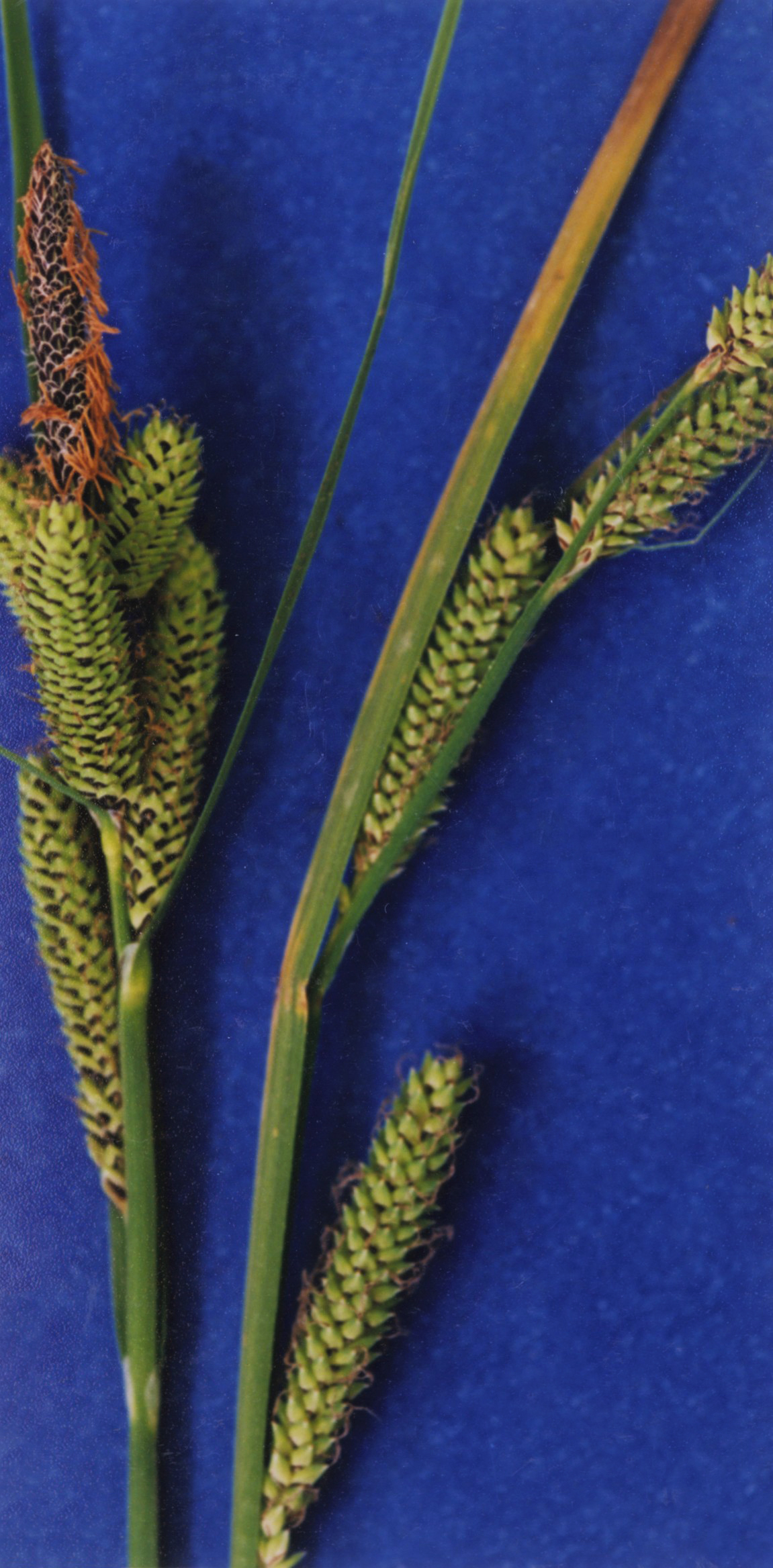

Scientific classification
- Kingdom: Plantae
- Clade: Tracheophytes
- Clade: Angiosperms
- Clade: Monocots
- Clade: Commelinids
- Order: Poales
- Family: Cyperaceae
- Genus: Carex
- Species: C. lenticularis

Binomial name
- Carex lenticularis Michx.

Synonyms
- Carex enanderi Carex hindsii Carex kelloggii Carex plectocarpa

= Carex lenticularis =

Species of grass-like plant

Carex lenticularis is a species of sedge known by the common names lakeshore sedge and goosegrass sedge. It is native to much of northern North America, including most all of Canada and the western United States, where it grows in wet habitats.

== Description ==
This sedge, Carex lenticularis, produces clumps of slender, greenish yellow, angled stems. The inflorescence bears erect spikes with a long bract exceeding the length of the spikes. The fruit is covered in a green, sometimes purple-dotted perigynium beneath a brown or black flower scale.
