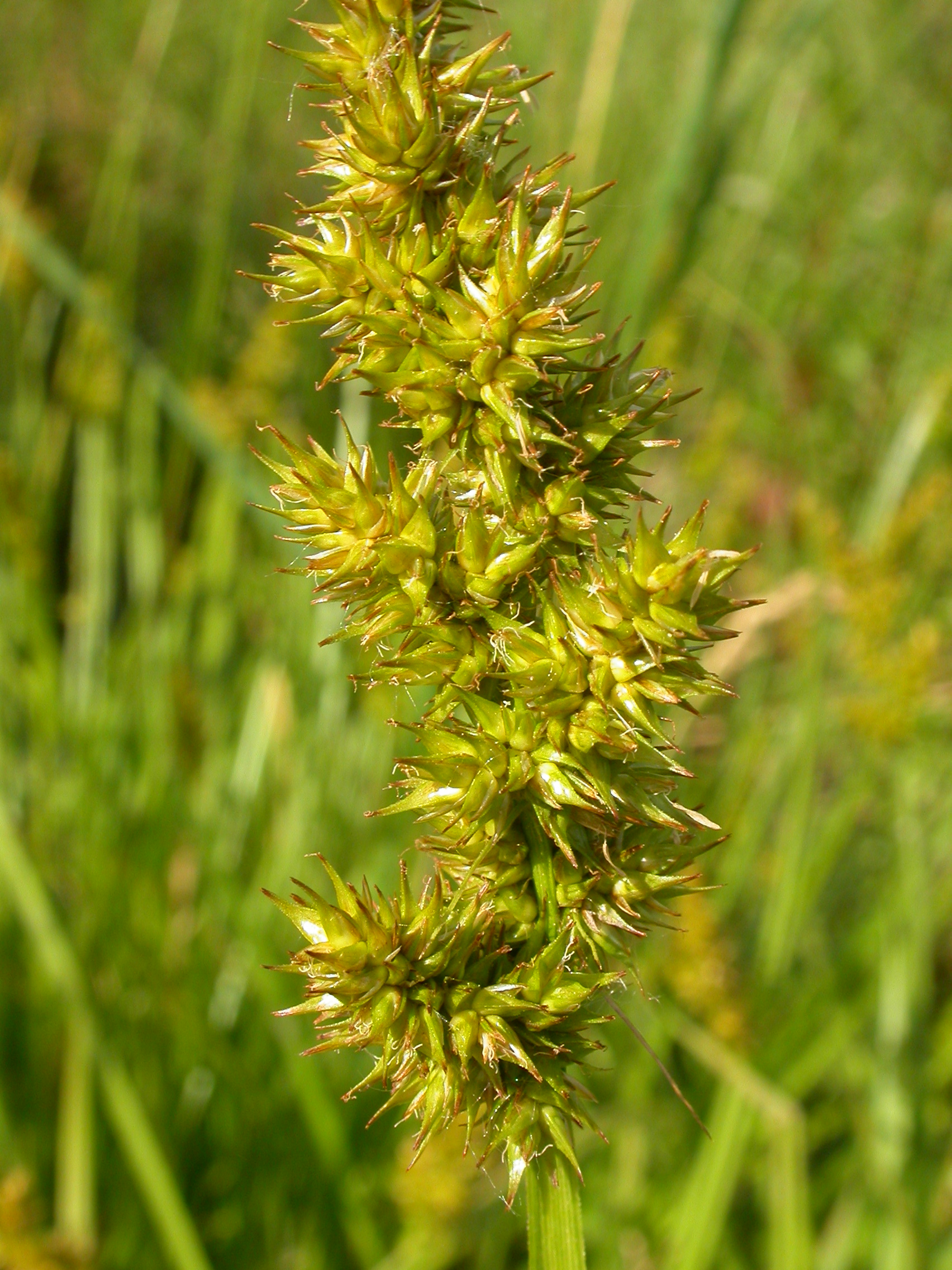
- Developing seeds
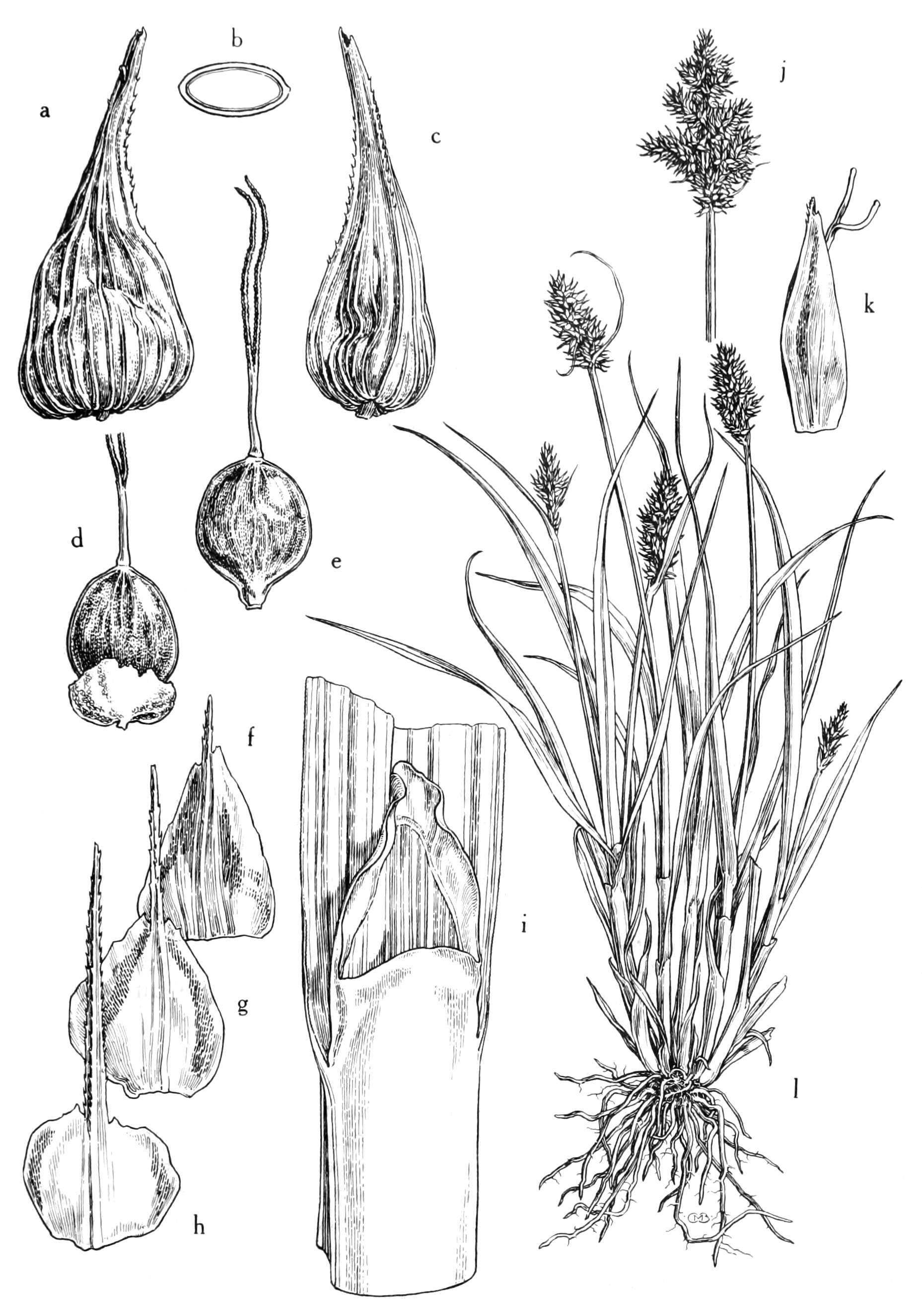
- Botanical illustration

Conservation status
- Least Concern (IUCN 3.1)

Scientific classification
- Kingdom: Plantae
- Clade: Tracheophytes
- Clade: Angiosperms
- Clade: Monocots
- Clade: Commelinids
- Order: Poales
- Family: Cyperaceae
- Genus: Carex
- Species: C. stipata

Binomial name
- Carex stipata Muhl. ex Willd.

Synonyms
- Loncoperis stipata (Muhl. ex Willd.) Raf.; Vignea stipata (Muhl. ex Willd.) Rchb.

= Carex stipata =

Species of grass-like plant

Carex stipata, variously called the prickly sedge, awl-fruited sedge, awlfruit sedge, owlfruit sedge, swamp sedge, sawbeak sedge, stalk-grain sedge and common fox sedge, is a species of flowering plant in the genus Carex, native to Canada, the United States, China, Korea, Japan, and Far Eastern Russia. It is a wetland obligate.

== Description ==
Carex stipata is a tuft-forming, grass-like plant, reaching 2 to 3 ft. in height. Leaves are coarse and elongate. The inflorescence is a spike, with a cluster of brown seed capsules high on each stem. The fruit is an achene.

== Distribution and habitat ==
Carex stipata favours wetland conditions, such as woodland swales, floodplains, marshes, water meadows, ditches and the area around streams and ponds.

== Subtaxa ==
The following varieties are currently accepted:

- Carex stipata var. maxima Chapm. ex Boott
- Carex stipata var. stipata
