= Yellow foxtail =

Yellow foxtail is a common name for several plants and may refer to:

- Pennisetum glaucum (formerly Setaria glauca)
- Setaria pumila, native to Europe

The picture below on the left is a picture of the Yellow Foxtail that we pulled from the ground near the SUNY Old Westbury Campus Center. The picture on the right shows a cross section of the same Yellow Foxtail root under a light microscope. The scientific name for this organism is Setaria pumila. The section we cut and prepared on a slide has clear characteristics of typical monocot (Monocotyledon) root anatomy. It reveals an outer epidermis surrounding a broad cortex composed of parenchyma cells. The endodermis, with its Casparian strip, forms the boundary between the cortex and the stele. Inside the vascular cylinder, xylem and phloem are arranged in the ring, with multiple vascular bundles alternating around the circumference. Unlike dicot roots, which usually lack a central core of parenchyma, these monocot roots have a distinct central pith. This arrangement allows for efficient transport of water, minerals, and photosynthates while keeping structural support in the root system.

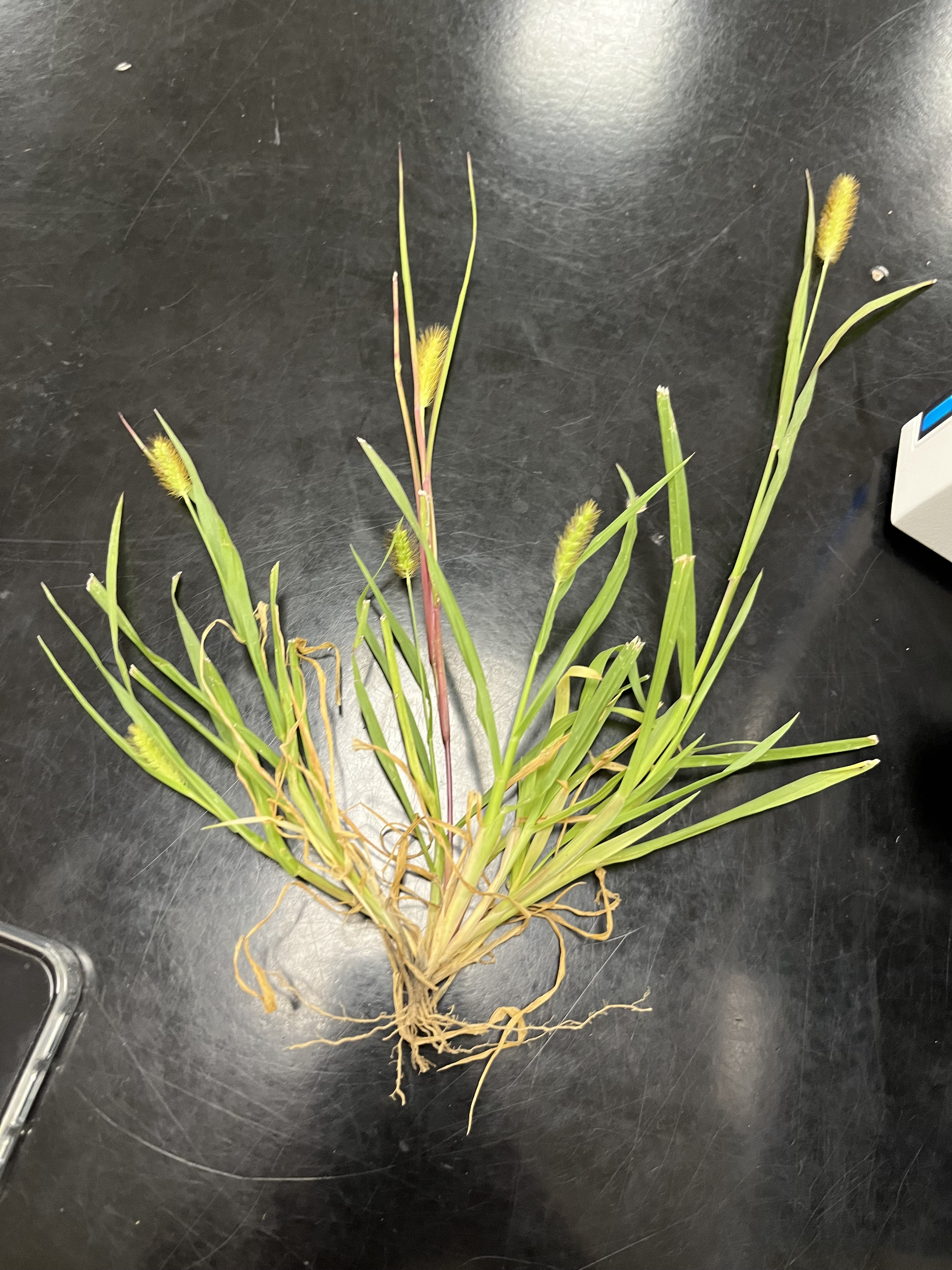
Picture of a pulled Yellow Foxtail plant.

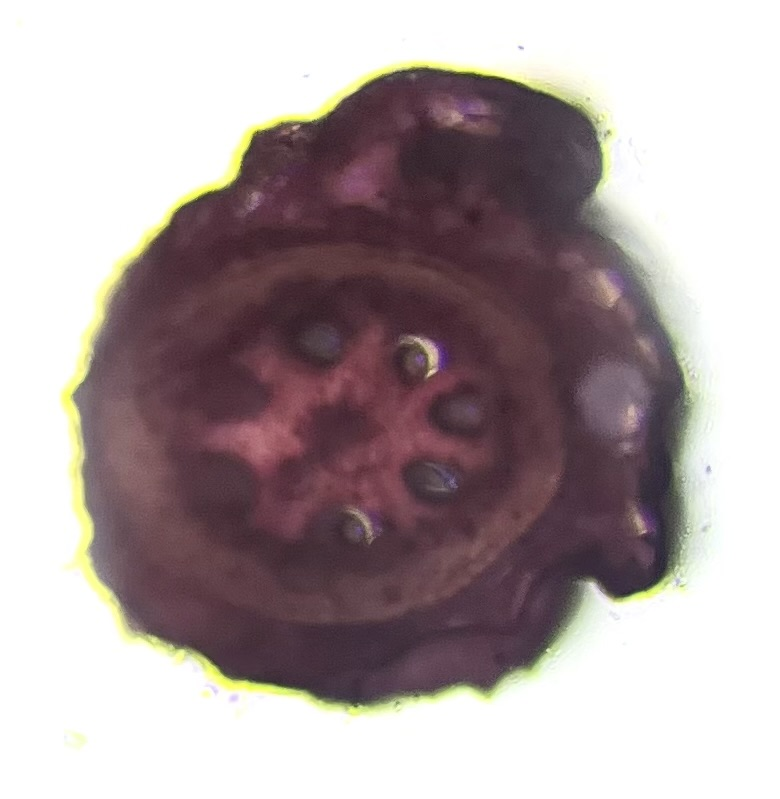
A Cross Section of a Yellow Foxtail Root under a microscope.

The cross section of the stem of the yellow foxtail shows the typical structure of a monocot. The vascular bundles are scattered throughout the ground tissue instead of being arranged in a ring. Each bundle contains both xylem and phloem for transporting water, minerals, and sugars, and is surrounded by a bundle sheath. The ground tissue is made up mostly of parenchyma cells, which help store nutrients and give the stem support. This scattered bundle arrangement is one of the key traits that distinguishes monocot stems from dicots.

The epidermis of a yellow foxtail leaf contains many stomata, which are openings formed by pairs of guard cells. These structures control gas exchange, letting carbon dioxide in for photosynthesis and releasing oxygen and water vapor. In monocots like Seteria pumila, the stomata are arranged in neat, parallel rows that follow the pattern of the leaf’s parallel venation. This alignment improves efficiency, as the stomata line up with the veins that deliver water and nutrients to the photosynthetic cells.

A cross section of the leaf of the yellow foxtail shows its upper and lower epidermis enclosing a layer of mesophyll cells packed with chloroplasts. Running through the blade are parallel vascular bundles, a feature characteristic of monocot leaves. These bundles transport water to the mesophyll and carry sugars away to the rest of the plant. The arrangement supports photosynthesis while maintaining the narrow, strap-like shape of the grass leaf. This structure shows the adaptations of grasses to grow efficiently in a wide variety of environments.

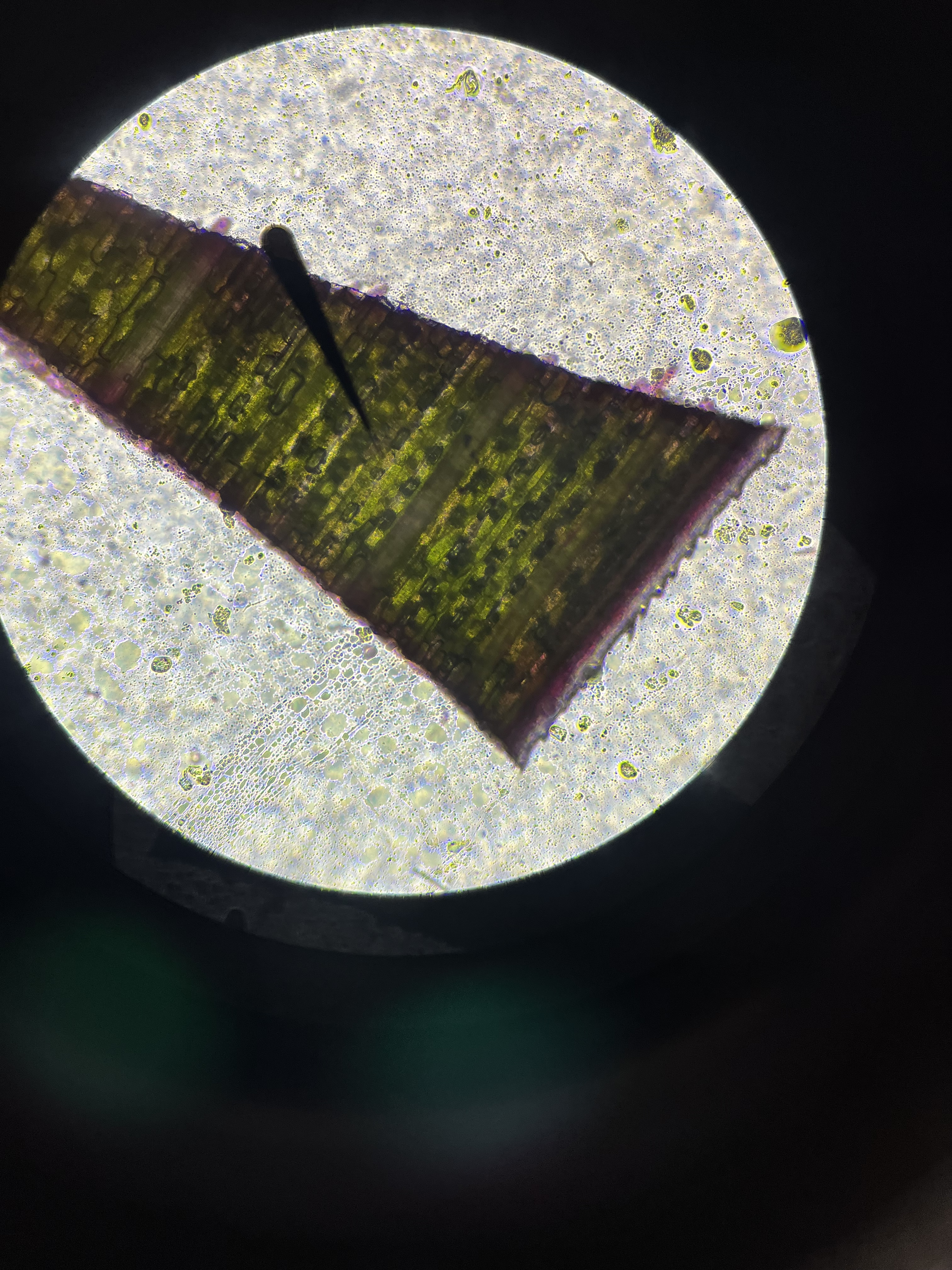
Cross section of a yellow foxtail leaf

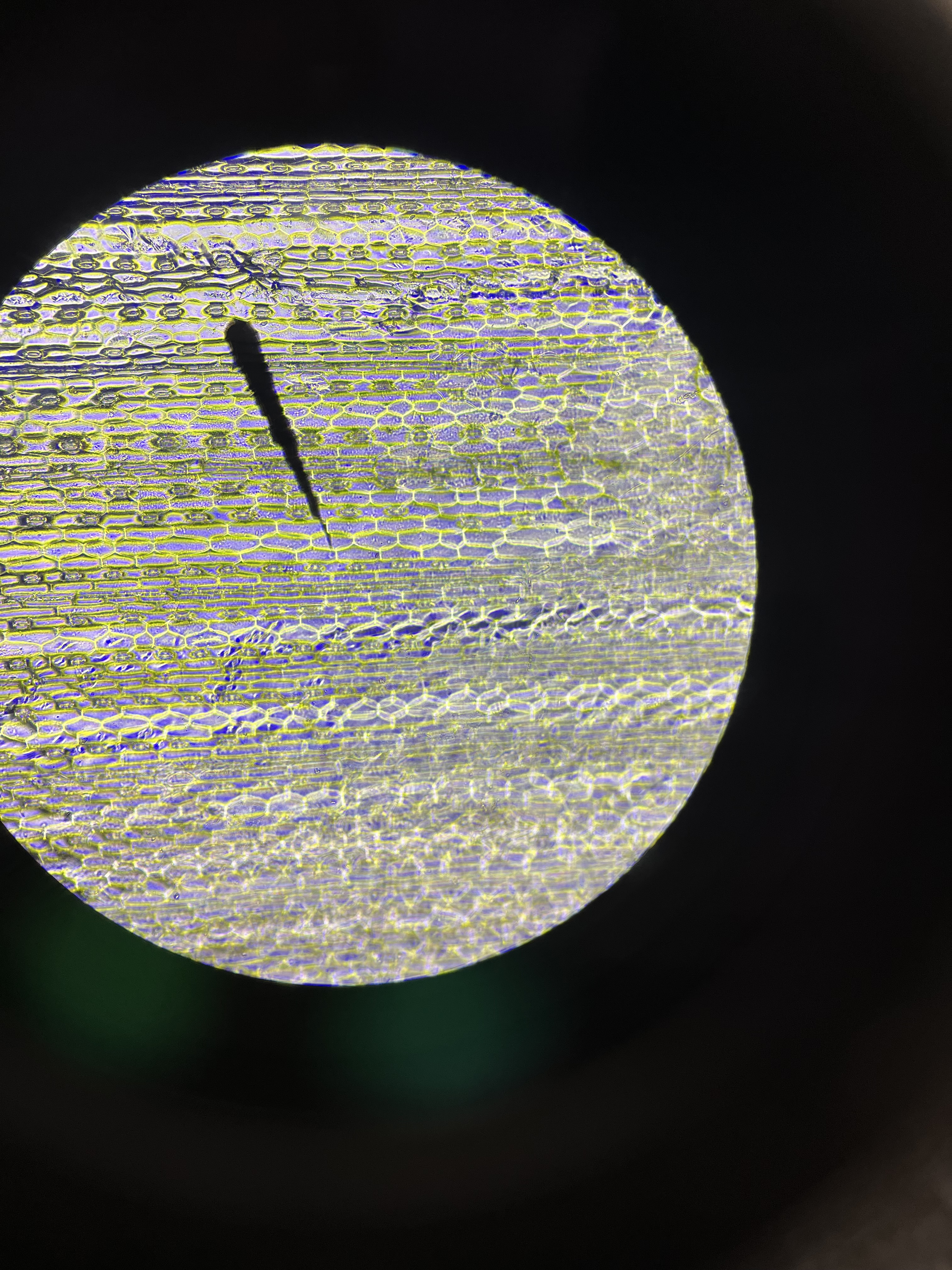
Stomata in Yellow foxtail leaf

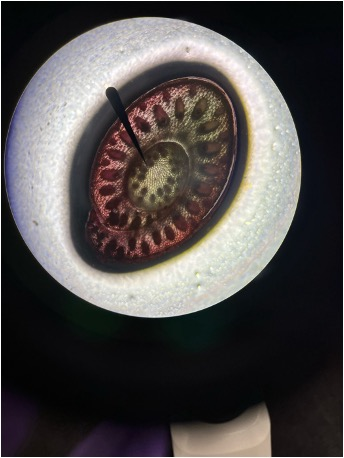
Cross section of a stem
