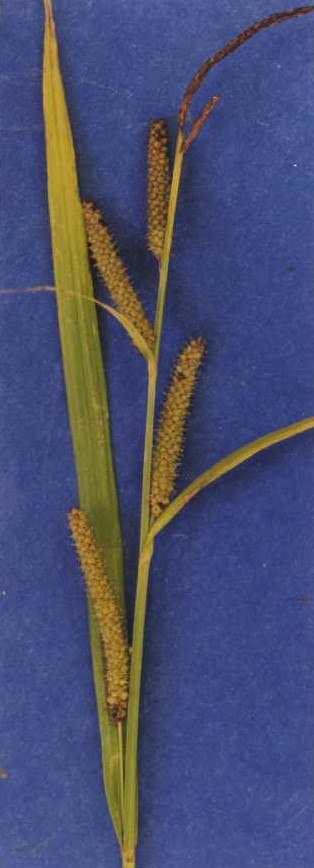

Scientific classification
- Kingdom: Plantae
- Clade: Tracheophytes
- Clade: Angiosperms
- Clade: Monocots
- Clade: Commelinids
- Order: Poales
- Family: Cyperaceae
- Genus: Carex
- Species: C. amplifolia

Binomial name
- Carex amplifolia Boott

= Carex amplifolia =

Species of grass-like plant

Carex amplifolia is a species of sedge known by the common name bigleaf sedge. It is native to western North America from British Columbia to Montana to California, where it grows in wet and seasonally wet areas in coniferous forests.

== Description ==
This rhizomatous sedge produces stems 50 to 100 centimeters tall. The winged stems have reddish tinted bases and are wrapped in long, roughly hairy leaves up to 2 centimeters wide. The inflorescence is made up of 5 to 8 cylindrical spikes each up to 10 or 14 centimeters long and often made up of hundreds of individual flowers.
