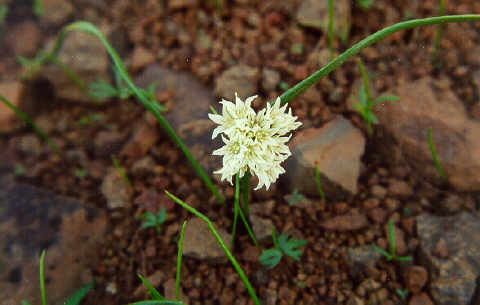

Conservation status
- Apparently Secure (NatureServe)

Scientific classification
- Kingdom: Plantae
- Clade: Tracheophytes
- Clade: Angiosperms
- Clade: Monocots
- Order: Asparagales
- Family: Amaryllidaceae
- Subfamily: Allioideae
- Genus: Allium
- Species: A. fibrillum

Binomial name
- Allium fibrillum M.E.Jones

Synonyms
- Allium collinum Douglas ex S.Watson 1879, illegitimate homonym not Guss. 1831.; Allium collinum Douglas in T.J.Howell 1902, illegitimate homonym not Guss. 1831.

= Allium fibrillum =

Species of flowering plant

Allium fibrillum is a North American species of wild onion known by the common names Blue Mountain onion and Cuddy Mountain onion. It is native to the northwestern United States from eastern Washington and Oregon through Idaho to Montana. It is a perennial herb.

This onion grows from a bulb or a cluster of a few bulbs which are rounded in shape and measure up to 1.2 centimeters long by 1 wide. There are two leaves which are flat and linear in shape and measure up to 24 centimeters in length. They usually begin to wither from the tip by the time the plant is in flower. The flowering stalk is up to 15 centimeters tall and bears an umbel of 10 to 20 bell-shaped white flowers with green or pink midribs. The fruit is a capsule. The plant reproduces sexually by seed or vegetatively by sprouting from its bulb.

This plant grows on mountaintops and scablands in sagebrush, shrubsteppe, and grassland habitat.
