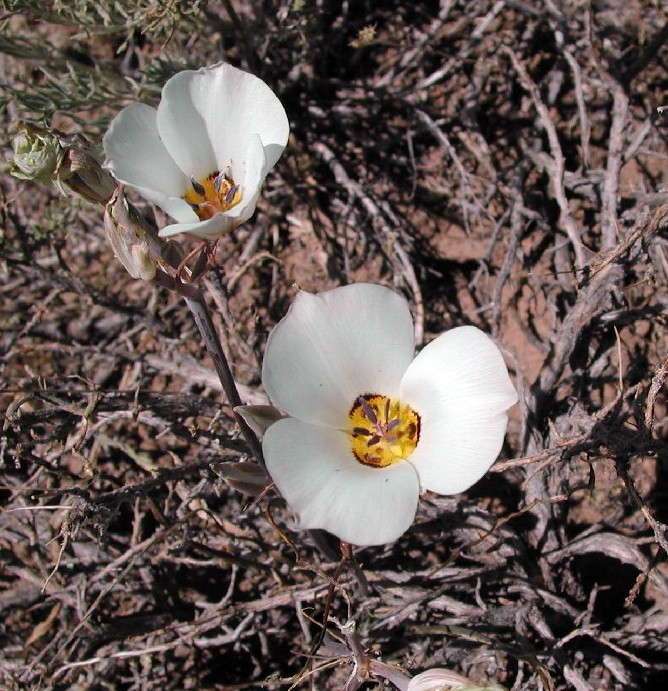

Conservation status
- Secure (NatureServe)

Scientific classification
- Kingdom: Plantae
- Clade: Embryophytes
- Clade: Tracheophytes
- Clade: Spermatophytes
- Clade: Angiosperms
- Clade: Monocots
- Order: Liliales
- Family: Liliaceae
- Genus: Calochortus
- Species: C. bruneaunis

Binomial name
- Calochortus bruneaunis A.Nelson & J.F.Macbr.

Synonyms
- Calochortus discolor; Calochortus nuttallii var. bruneaunis

= Calochortus bruneaunis =

Plant species in the lily family

Calochortus bruneaunis is a species of flowering plant in the lily family, and is known by the common name Bruneau mariposa lily.

== Description ==
Calochortus bruneaunis is a perennial herb producing a mostly unbranching stem up to 40 centimeters tall. The leaf at the base of the stem is narrow in shape, reaching 10 to 20 centimeters long and withering away at flowering.

The inflorescence bears 1 to 4 erect bell-shaped flowers. The pointed sepals and larger, rounded petals are white to lilac-tinted in base color. The sepals are marked with a reddish or greenish spot or streak toward their bases and the petals have a greenish streak on the outer surface and a base of yellow, purple, and red coloration on the inner surface.

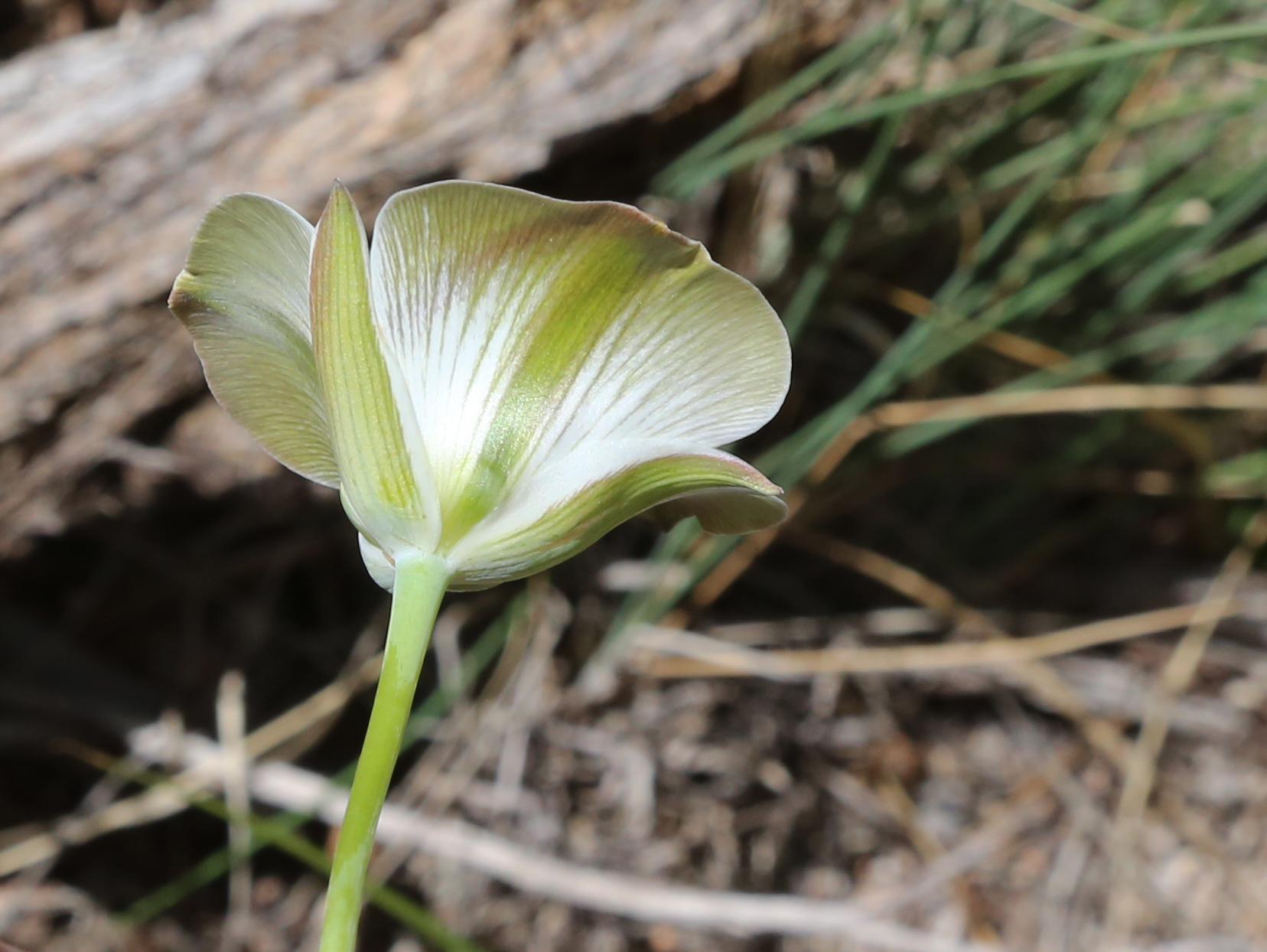
Calochortus bruneaunis, green streak on underside of petal

The fruit is a narrow, angled capsule up to 7 centimeters long. It contains several flat, yellow seeds.

== Taxonomy ==
Calochortus bruneaunis was scientifically described and named by Aven Nelson and James Francis Macbride in 1913. It is classified as part of the genus Calochortus within the Liliaceae family. In 1940 Francis Marion Ownbey described it as a variety of Calochortus nuttallii, but it is an accepted species according to Plants of the World Online. It has one heterotypic synonym, Calochortus discolor, described and named by Anstruther Davidson in 1915.

== Distribution ==
Bruneau mariposa lilies are native to six states in the Western United States, California, Oregon, Nevada, Utah, Idaho, and Montana. It generally grows in dry, Sagebrush steppe habitats.
