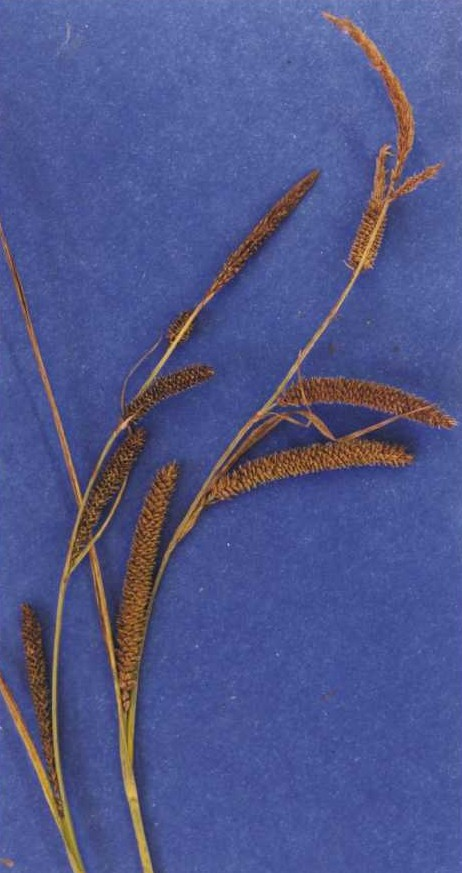

Scientific classification
- Kingdom: Plantae
- Clade: Tracheophytes
- Clade: Angiosperms
- Clade: Monocots
- Clade: Commelinids
- Order: Poales
- Family: Cyperaceae
- Genus: Carex
- Species: C. angustata

Binomial name
- Carex angustata Boott

Synonyms
- Carex egregia Carex eurycarpa Carex oxycarpa

= Carex angustata =

Species of grass-like plant

Carex angustata is a species of sedge known by the common name widefruit sedge. It is native to the western United States from Washington and Idaho to California, where it grows in wet meadows and on streambanks.

== Description ==
This sedge grows from a large rhizome network and does not form clumps as many other sedges do. The stems reach up to about a meter in maximum height with narrow, rough leaves. The inflorescence produces a few pistillate spikes and one or two staminate spikes, each a few centimeters long. The pistillate flowers have dark colored bracts. The fruit is covered in a sac called a perigynium which is 2 or 3 millimeters long, veined and bumpy, and generally green or pale brown in color, sometimes with red or purple spotting.
