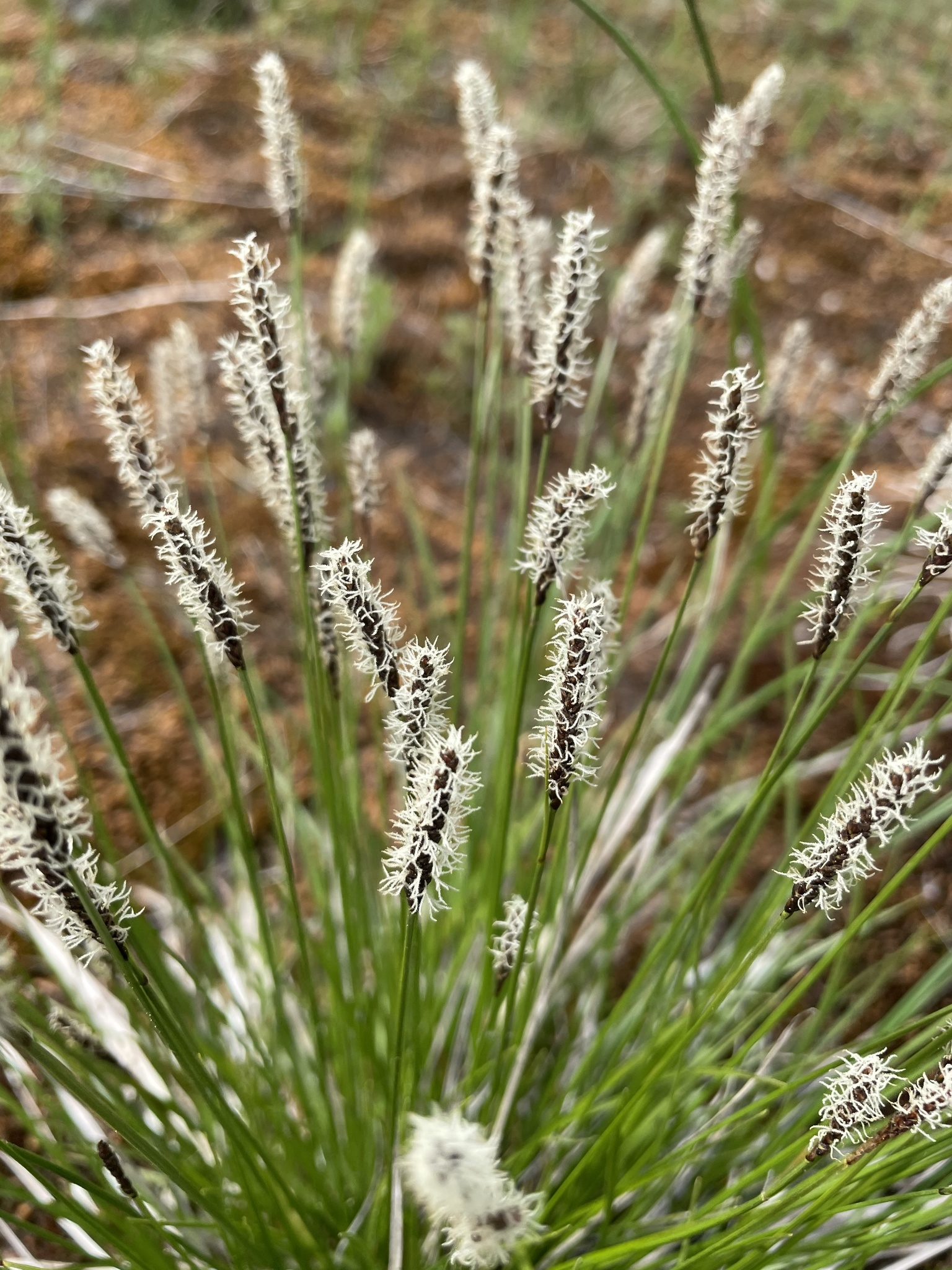

Scientific classification
- Kingdom: Plantae
- Clade: Tracheophytes
- Clade: Angiosperms
- Clade: Monocots
- Clade: Commelinids
- Order: Poales
- Family: Cyperaceae
- Genus: Carex
- Species: C. scirpoidea

Binomial name
- Carex scirpoidea Michx.

= Carex scirpoidea =

Species of grass-like plant

Carex scirpoidea is a species of sedge belonging to the family Cyperaceae. It is dioecious, with male and female flowers on separate plants.

Its native range is Norway (Solvågtind), Russia (Siberia and far eastern Russia), Greenland, Canada and the US.
