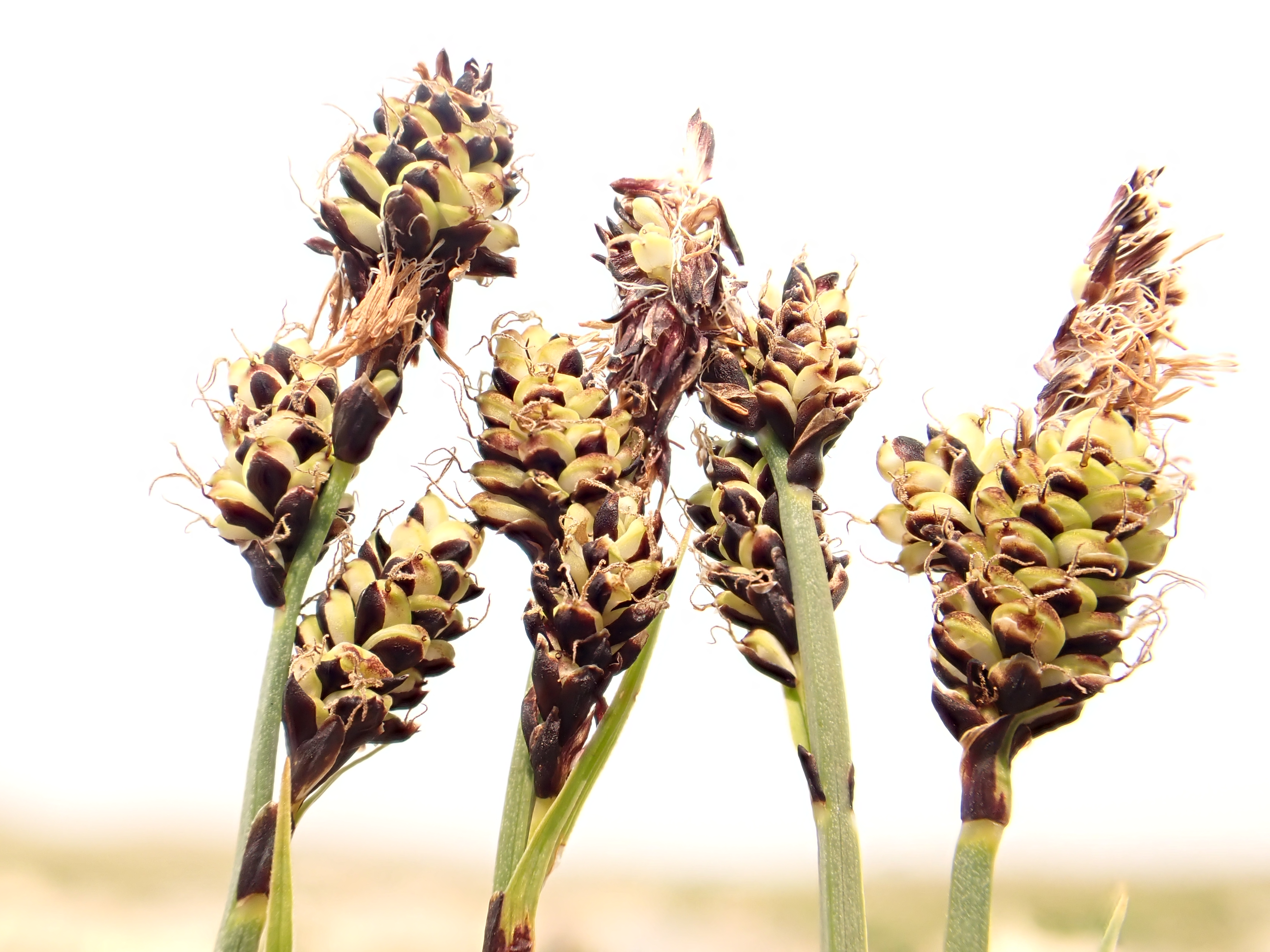

Scientific classification
- Kingdom: Plantae
- Clade: Tracheophytes
- Clade: Angiosperms
- Clade: Monocots
- Clade: Commelinids
- Order: Poales
- Family: Cyperaceae
- Genus: Carex
- Species: C. media

Binomial name
- Carex media R.Br., 1823

= Carex media =

Species of sedge

Carex media, also known as closed-headed sedge and Montana sedge, is a tussock-forming perennial in the family Cyperaceae. It is native to Canada, parts of the United States, Russia, Finland, Sweden, and Norway.

== See also ==
- List of Carex species
