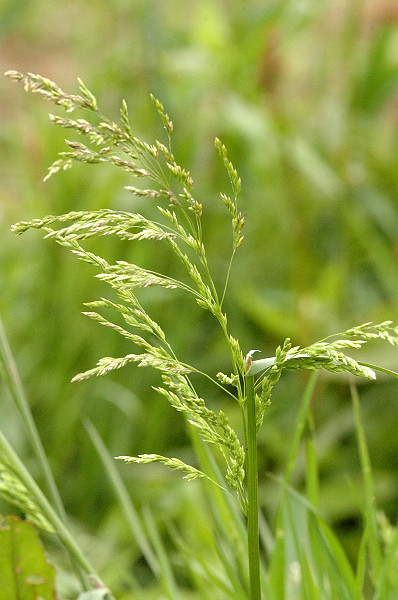

Scientific classification
- Kingdom: Plantae
- Clade: Tracheophytes
- Clade: Angiosperms
- Clade: Monocots
- Clade: Commelinids
- Order: Poales
- Family: Poaceae
- Subfamily: Pooideae
- Genus: Poa
- Species: P. compressa

Binomial name
- Poa compressa L.

= Poa compressa =

Species of grass

Poa compressa, the Canada bluegrass or flattened meadow-grass, is a perennial flattened meadow grass, similar to common meadow-grass, Poa pratensis. It is native to Europe but it can be found nearly worldwide as an introduced species. It grows in old wall tops, pavement cracks, dry stony grassland, and many types of wild habitat. It has a flattened stem, 23–30 cm tall, a close one sided panicle of grey green, with purple florets.

The ligule is rounded.
