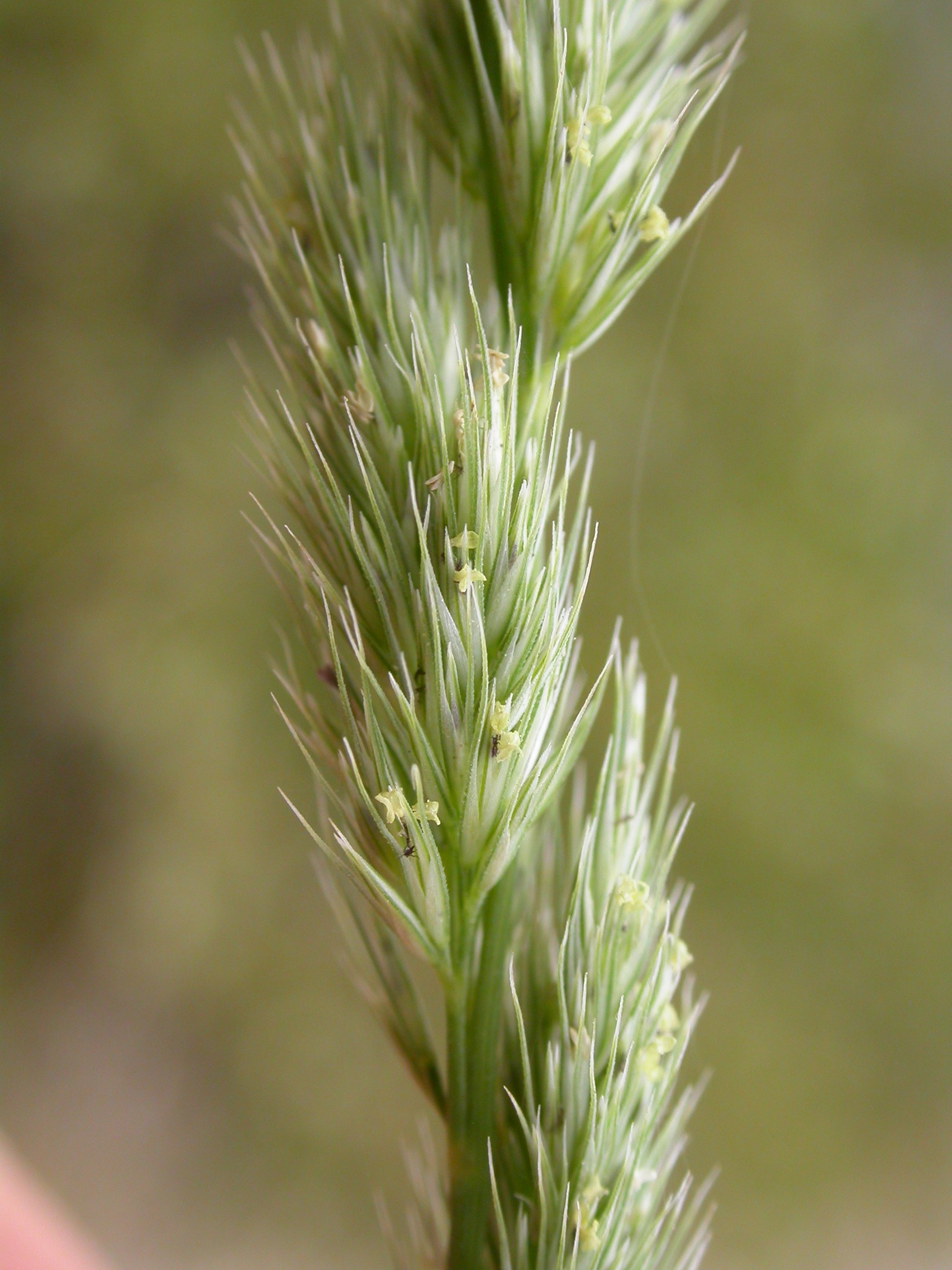
- In Montana, USA

Conservation status
- Secure (NatureServe)

Scientific classification
- Kingdom: Plantae
- Clade: Tracheophytes
- Clade: Angiosperms
- Clade: Monocots
- Clade: Commelinids
- Order: Poales
- Family: Poaceae
- Subfamily: Chloridoideae
- Genus: Muhlenbergia
- Species: M. glomerata

Binomial name
- Muhlenbergia glomerata (Willd.) Trin.

= Muhlenbergia glomerata =

Species of grass

Muhlenbergia glomerata is a species of grass known as spiked muhly and marsh muhly. It is native to North America, where it occurs across Canada and the northern half of the United States.

== Description ==
This grass produces branching stems up to 1.2 meters tall from a network of rhizomes. The inflorescence is a narrow panicle of spikelets which are up to 8 millimeters long.

== Distribution and habitat ==
This North American grass is found in moist areas in various habitat types. It grows in bogs, marshes, meadows, ditches, fens, swamps, riversides and lakeshores, hot springs, wet forests, alvars, and seasonally flooded land. It occurs in cooler, more moist places than many other C_{4} species. It occurs less often in dry places.
