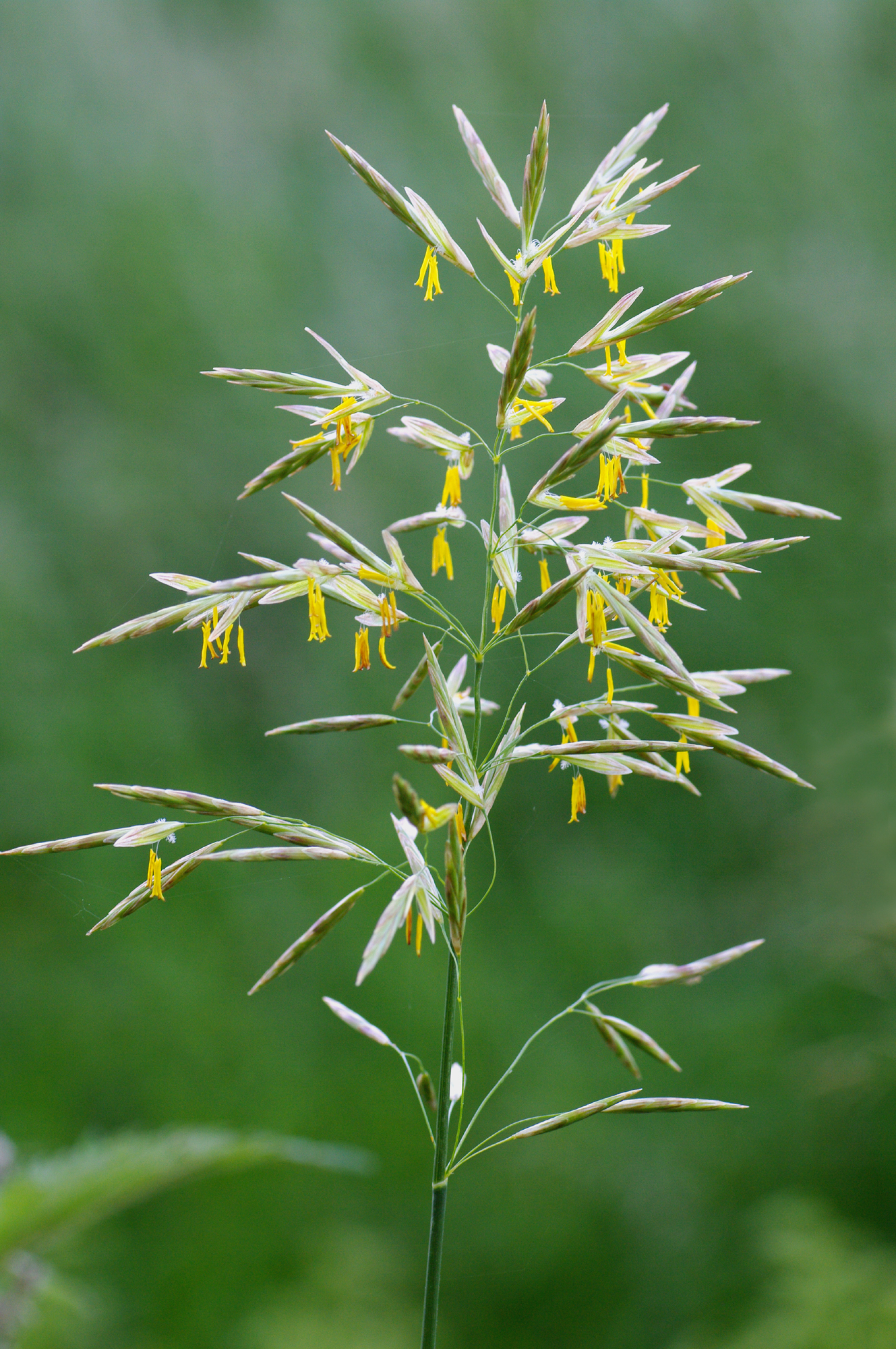

Scientific classification
- Kingdom: Plantae
- Clade: Tracheophytes
- Clade: Angiosperms
- Clade: Monocots
- Clade: Commelinids
- Order: Poales
- Family: Poaceae
- Subfamily: Pooideae
- Genus: Bromus
- Species: B. inermis

Binomial name
- Bromus inermis Leyss.

= Bromus inermis =

Species of grass

Bromus inermis is a species of the true grass family (Poaceae). This rhizomatous grass is native to Europe and considered invasive in North America.

The plant is an erect, leafy, long-lived perennial, 46 to 91 cm (1 1/2 to 3 ft) tall, rhizomatous and commonly producing a dense sod. It starts growth in early spring; flowers May to July; reproduces from seeds, tillers, and rhizomes. It may regrow and re flower in the fall if moisture is sufficient. The leaves are glabrous or occasionally pubescent, particularly on the sheaths; blades 20 to 38 cm (8 to 15 in) long, 0.6 to 1.3 cm (1/4 to 1/2 in) wide, flat, with a raised and keeled midrib below; sheaths closed, except near collar, and papery when dry; leaves rolled in the bud; ligates up to 0.3 cm (1/8 in) long, rounded, and membranous; auricles absent.

== Common names ==
- Bromus inermis subsp. inermis
  - Austrian bromegrass – English
  - awnless brome – English
  - Hungarian brome – English
  - Hungarian bromegrass – English
  - Russian bromegrass – English
  - smooth brome – English
  - smooth bromegrass – English
  - brome inerme – French
  - brome sans arêtes – French
  - unbegrannte Trespe – German
  - wehrlose Trespe – German
  - magyar rozsnok - Hungarian
  - árva rozsnok - Hungarian
  - mágocsi rozsnok - Hungarian
  - capim-cevadilha – Portuguese
  - bromo de Hungría – Spanish
  - bromo inerme – Spanish
- Bromus inermis subsp. pumpellianus
  - Arctic brome – English
  - Pumpelly's brome – English
