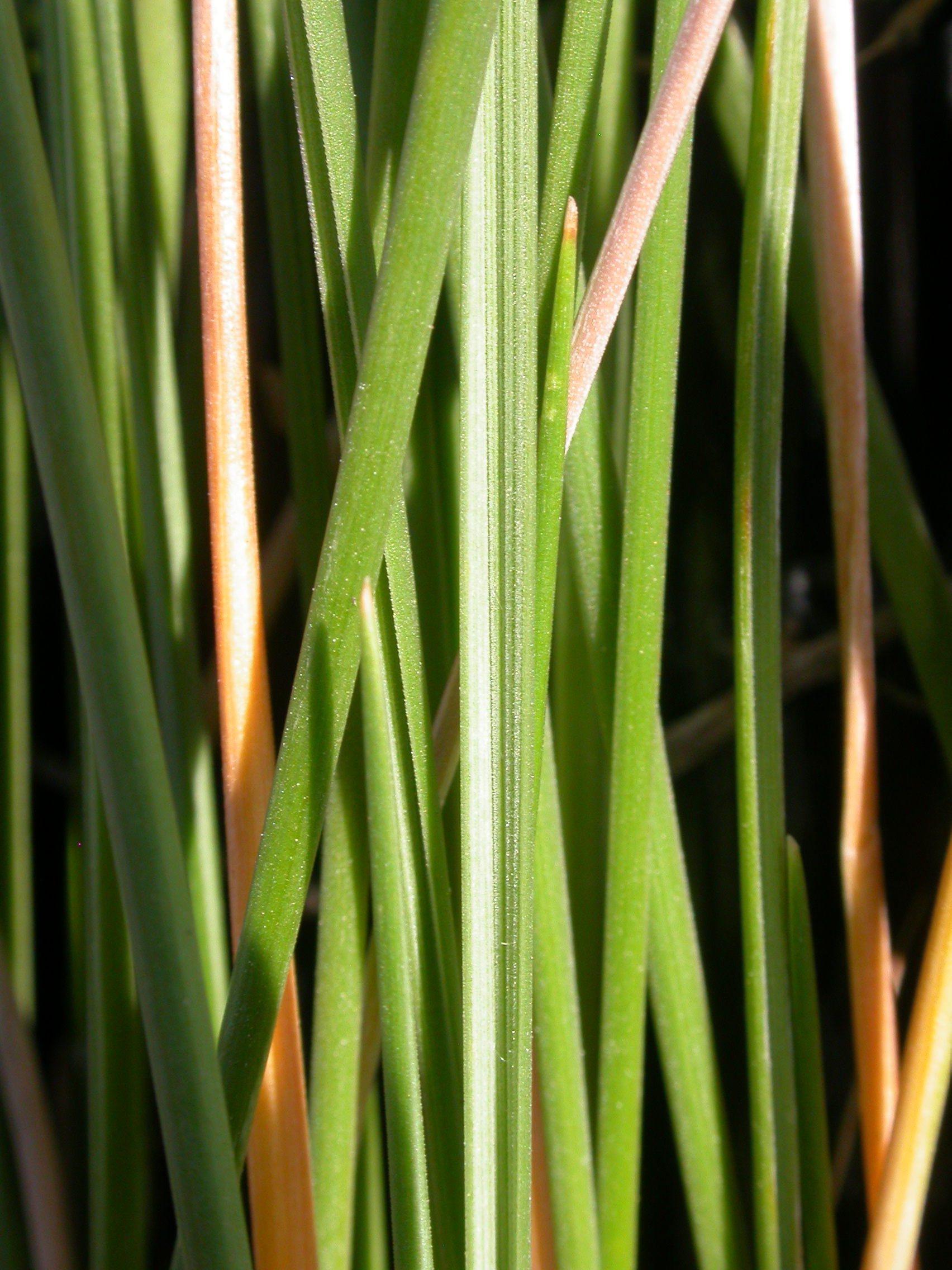

Conservation status
- Secure (NatureServe)

Scientific classification
- Kingdom: Plantae
- Clade: Tracheophytes
- Clade: Angiosperms
- Clade: Monocots
- Clade: Commelinids
- Order: Poales
- Family: Poaceae
- Subfamily: Pooideae
- Genus: Festuca
- Species: F. altaica

Binomial name
- Festuca altaica Trin.

Synonyms
- Festuca scabrella Torr. ex Hook.; Festuca duthiei Hack. ex Stapf; Festuca altaica subsp. scabrella (Torr. ex Hook.) Hultén; Festuca altaica f. pallida Jordal; Festuca altaica f. vivipara Jordal; Festuca altaica var. scabrella (Torr. ex Hook.) Breitung

= Festuca altaica =

Species of flowering plant

Festuca altaica, also known as the altai fescue, or the northern rough fescue, is a perennial bunchgrass with a wide native distribution in the Arctic, from central Asia to eastern North America. It was first described in 1829 by Carl Bernhard von Trinius. It is under the synonym F. scabrella, the rough fescue.

== Description ==
Festuca altaica is a densely tufted perennial grass. The tufts are connected by short rhizomes. The flowering stems (culms) are usually 30–90 cm (1–3 ft) tall, but may reach 120 cm (4 ft). The upper (adaxial) surface of the leaves is densely covered with short hairs. A ligule is present and is 0.1–0.6 mm (0.004–0.024 in) long. The inflorescence is a loose panicle. The spikelets are 8–14 mm (0.3–0.6 in) long, purple to brown in color, and have 3 to 6 individual florets. Festuca altaica flowers and fruits from late spring to the fall.

== Taxonomy ==
Festuca altaica was first described in 1829 by Carl Bernhard von Trinius, who wrote the section on grasses in Flora Altaica, whose principal author was Carl Friedrich von Ledebour. Festuca scabrella was described in 1840 by John Torrey in William Jackson Hooker's Flora Boreali-Americana. It was reduced to a subspecies of F. altaica in 1942 and then a variety in 1957. It is now considered to be a synonym of F. altaica.

== Distribution ==
Festuca altaica has a wide Arctic distribution. In temperate Asia it is native to Siberia and the Russian Far East, Kazakhstan, Mongolia and Xinjiang in China. In North America it occurs throughout the subarctic, in western Canada, in parts of eastern Canada (Labrador, Newfoundland and Quebec) and into Michigan in the United States. The Canadian province of Alberta, in the Canadian Prairies region, is home to a large area of grassland containing this species. Under the name Festuca scabrella, rough fescue is the provincial grass of Alberta.
