= Elachista leucofrons =

Scientific classification
- Domain: Eukaryota
- Kingdom: Animalia
- Phylum: Arthropoda
- Class: Insecta
- Order: Lepidoptera
- Family: Elachistidae
- Genus: Elachista
- Species: E. leucofrons

Binomial name
- Elachista leucofrons Braun, 1920

Species of moth

Elachista leucofrons is a moth of the family Elachistidae. It is found in the United States, where it has been recorded from Maine, Ohio, North Carolina, California, Colorado and New Mexico. The habitat consists of low-lying deciduous forests.

The wingspan is 9–10 mm. Adults have been recorded on wing in February, May and August, depending on the location. There is one generation per year.

The larvae feed on Elymus canadensis, Elymus virginicus and Hystrix species (including Hystrix patula). Mining larvae can be found from late February to mid-April.
