= Bottlebrush =

Bottlebrush may refer to:

- A type of brush intended for cleaning bottles
- Any of several plants commonly known as bottlebrush
  - Callistemon, a genus of shrubs and trees from Australia
  - Beaufortia, a genus of shrubs from Australia
  - Elymus hystrix, a species of grass from eastern North America
  - Elymus californicus, a species of grass from California
- Bottlebrush (cave formation)

== See also ==
- Bottlebrush buckeye, a species of shrub from the southeastern United States
