= Elymus wiegandii =

Scientific classification
- Kingdom: Plantae
- Clade: Embryophytes
- Clade: Tracheophytes
- Clade: Angiosperms
- Clade: Monocots
- Clade: Commelinids
- Order: Poales
- Family: Poaceae
- Subfamily: Pooideae
- Genus: Elymus
- Species: E. wiegandii

Binomial name
- Elymus wiegandii Fernald

Synonyms
- Elymus wiegandii var. calvescens (Fernald) A.Haines; Elymus canadensis var. wiegandii (Fernald) Bowden; Elymus canadensis subsp. wiegandii (Fernald) Á.Löve

Species of grass

Elymus wiegandii, or Wiegand's wildrye, is a plant indigenous to North America. It has broader leaves than Canada wildrye (Elymus canadensis) and a strongly drooping inflorescence.
