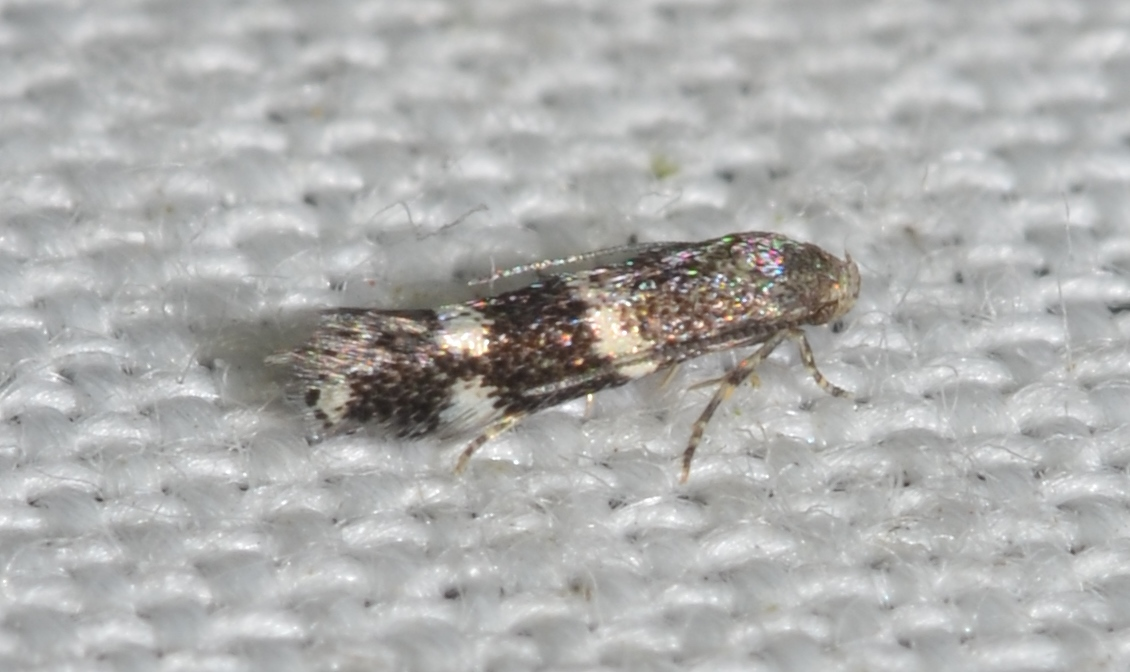

Scientific classification
- Kingdom: Animalia
- Phylum: Arthropoda
- Clade: Pancrustacea
- Class: Insecta
- Order: Lepidoptera
- Family: Elachistidae
- Genus: Elachista
- Species: E. illectella

Binomial name
- Elachista illectella (Clemens, 1860)

Synonyms
- Cosmiotes illectella Clemens, 1860; Elachista praematurella Clemens, 1860; Elachista cristatella Chambers, 1876; Elachista albapalpella Chambers, 1881

= Elachista illectella =

Species of moth

Elachista illectella is a moth of the family Elachistidae. It is found in North America, where it has been recorded from Arizona, Illinois, Indiana, Kentucky, Maine, Mississippi, Ohio, Oklahoma, Ontario, Tennessee, Texas and West Virginia. The habitat consists of deciduous forests.

The wingspan is 6–8 millimetres (0.24–0.31 in). Adults are sexually dimorphic.

The larvae feed on Poa (including Poa pratensis), Agrostis, Hystrix, Elymus, Oryzopsis, Bromus and Phleum species. They mine the leaves of their host plant.
