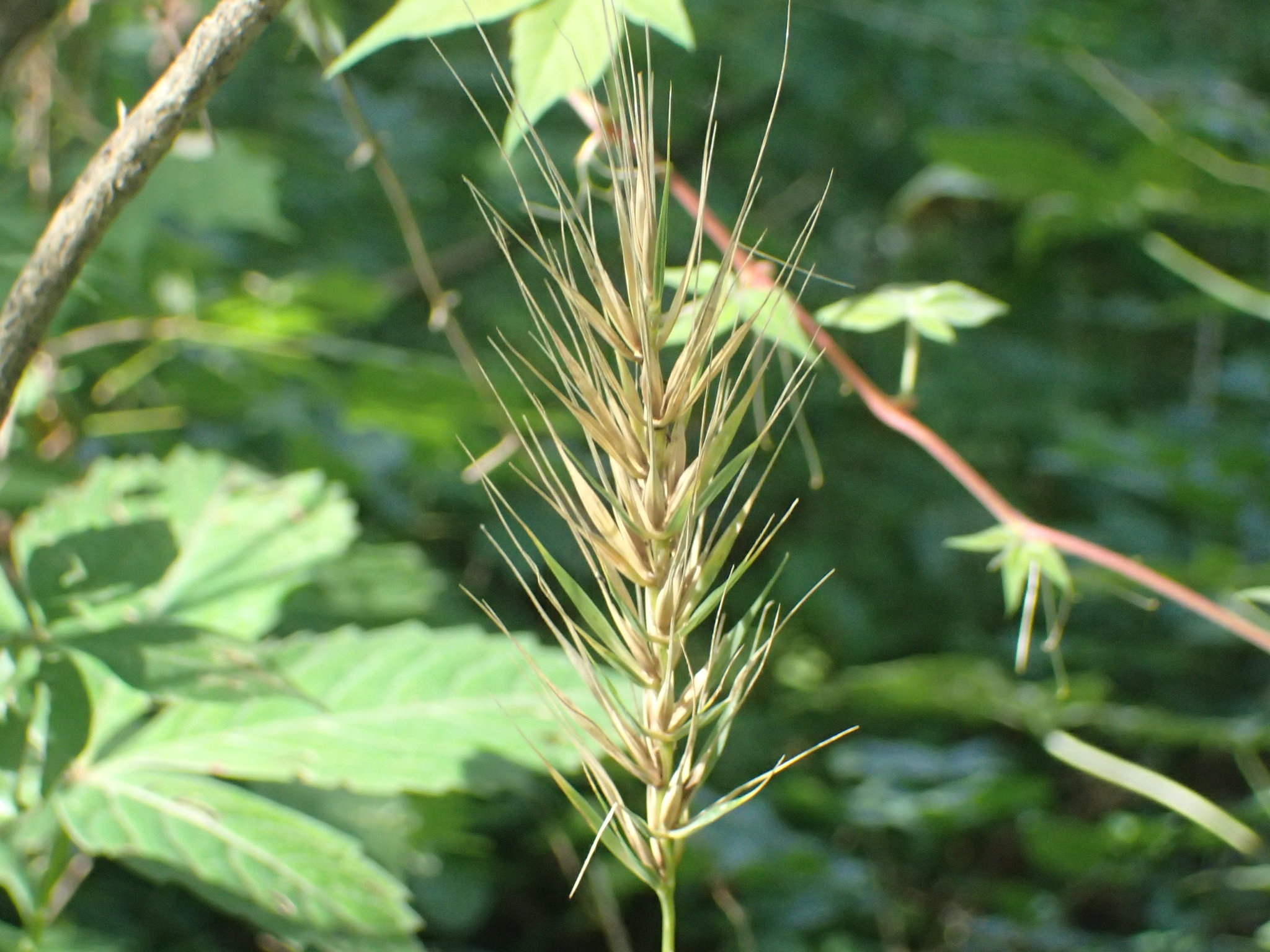

Scientific classification
- Kingdom: Plantae
- Clade: Tracheophytes
- Clade: Angiosperms
- Clade: Monocots
- Clade: Commelinids
- Order: Poales
- Family: Poaceae
- Subfamily: Pooideae
- Genus: Elymus
- Species: E. macgregorii

Binomial name
- Elymus macgregorii R.E.Brooks & J.J.N.Campb.

= Elymus macgregorii =

Species of grass

Elymus macgregorii, also known as early wildrye and Macgregor's wildrye, is a species of grass found in North America, usually east of the 100th meridian. It hybridizes readily with Elymus virginicus and Elymus hystrix.

== Description ==
Elymus macgregorii is a perennial, facultative wetland species that grows about 4 feet (1.2 m) tall.

It is often found alongside sugar maple, white ash, and American linden. It flowers and fruits from mid-May to late June.
