= Bottletop (disambiguation) =

Bottletop or Bottle Tops or variation, may refer to:

- Bottle top or bottle cap
- The Bottletop Band, a supergroup
- Bottle Tops, an accessory for capping opened aluminum cans
- Pogs or bottletops, a game using bottle cap tops

== See also ==
- Bottle (disambiguation)
- Top (disambiguation)
