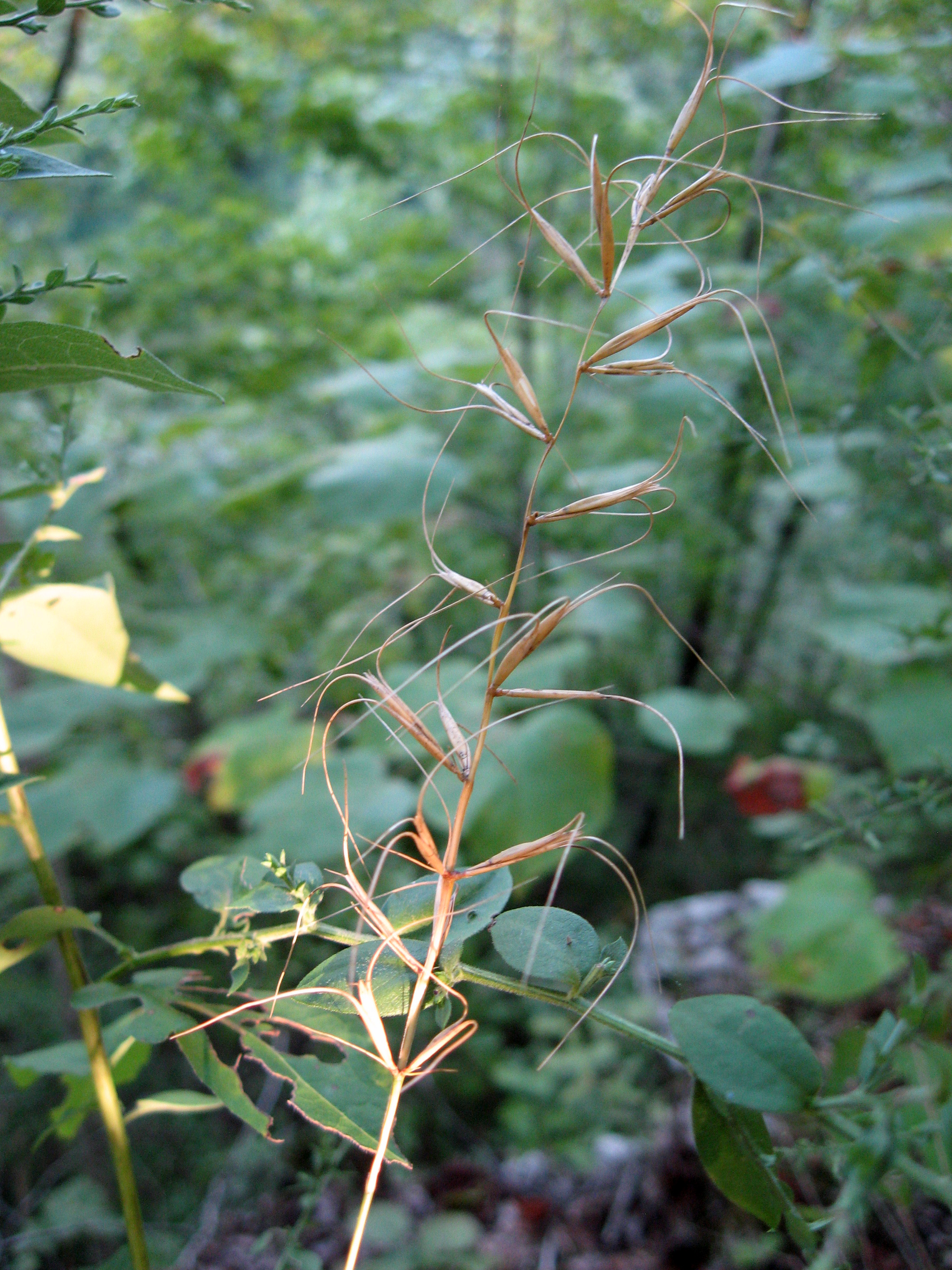

Conservation status
- Vulnerable (NatureServe)

Scientific classification
- Kingdom: Plantae
- Clade: Tracheophytes
- Clade: Angiosperms
- Clade: Monocots
- Clade: Commelinids
- Order: Poales
- Family: Poaceae
- Subfamily: Pooideae
- Genus: Elymus
- Species: E. svensonii

Binomial name
- Elymus svensonii G.L. Church

= Elymus svensonii =

Species of grass

Elymus svensonii, commonly called Svenson's wildrye, is a species of flowering plant in the grass family (Poaceae). It is native to United States, where it is endemic to the Interior Low Plateau of Kentucky and Tennessee. Its natural habitat is on dry, rocky, limestone river bluffs.

It is a rare species, with a restricted range and narrow suitable habitat. Because of these reasons it is considered to be "Vulnerable" (G3) by NatureServe. However, estimating population size is difficult due to its habitat on sheer cliffs, which are dangerous for researchers to access. It is possible that in hard-to-reach areas, populations may be reasonably large.

Elymus svensonii is a perennial grass. It is similar to Elymus hystrix, with which it sometimes hybridizes. It can be distinguished from Elymus hystrix by its curving lemma awns, generally larger glumes, and nodding spikes.
