= Chionodes figurella =

Scientific classification
- Kingdom: Animalia
- Phylum: Arthropoda
- Clade: Pancrustacea
- Class: Insecta
- Order: Lepidoptera
- Family: Gelechiidae
- Genus: Chionodes
- Species: C. figurella

Binomial name
- Chionodes figurella (Busck, 1912)

Synonyms
- Gelechia figurella Busck, 1912

Species of moth

Chionodes figurella is a moth in the family Gelechiidae. It is found in North America, where it has been recorded from Washington to California and Nevada.

The wingspan is 15–21 mm. The forewings are ochreous, thickly suffused with stone-grey and dark ochreous scales, which totally obscure the ground-color except on the veins, which are visible as thin whitish ochreous lines. The hindwings are silvery white.

The larvae feed on Elymus species, including Elymus glaucus.
