= Apamea atriclava =

Scientific classification
- Kingdom: Animalia
- Phylum: Arthropoda
- Clade: Pancrustacea
- Class: Insecta
- Order: Lepidoptera
- Superfamily: Noctuoidea
- Family: Noctuidae
- Genus: Apamea
- Species: A. atriclava

Binomial name
- Apamea atriclava Barnes & McDunnough, 1913

Synonyms
- Apamea lignicolora atriclava

Species of moth

Apamea atriclava is a moth of the family Noctuidae and Genus Aparmea. It is found in parts of North America, mainly the United States and parts of Canada. The moth's wingspan is about 43 mm (1.7 in) and it was formerly considered to be a subspecies of Apamea lignicolora. It is not known to have any special economic importance and is not extensively studied.

== Habitat and distribution ==
A. atriclava is found along portions of the North American Pacific coast, with specimens collected between southern British Columbia and down through Washington State, Oregon and California to the Northern Sierra Nevada. It is not commonly collected, but can be moderately common in parts of its habitat, including wooded regions of Oregon. Its northern range limit is East-Central Vancouver Island. The species is endemic to moist conifer forests at low to middle elevations of the Rocky Mountains (on its western side) and in forest grasslands. Two aberrant specimens are known, one from interior British Columbia and one from the Montana - Idaho Border.

== Description ==
See Glossary of entomology terms

A. atriclava is a broad winged species, with a wingspan of 43mm and a forewing length of 19 to 23mm, and a slightly scalloped outer wing margin. It molts medium-dark orange brown with darker spots around along the costa (anterior margin of forewing), cell (portion of wing surrounded by veins) and fold distal of claviform spot (elongated spot). Most of its terminal area is gray-brown, apart from the apex, and it is divided by a W mark on its subterminal. In general, the forewings have an orange brown colouration with fainter brown crosslines, its veins have darker colouring and dark angled segment. Orbicular, Reniform, and Claviform spots are rather small with reniform spots having a distinct blue-gray patch. Its hindwings are light-orange tan with dark brown-gray outer dark veins, a yellow-orange or rust coloured fringe with a thin post medial line. Its head and thorax have brown edges thought they themselves are orange brown with males possessing a bead like antennae.

== Life history ==
In its larval form, it is a cutworm that lives in the sub soil surface and feeds on grasses (Poaceae, mainly Elytrigia) while in its adult form, it is single brooded and flies during the summer months. It has mostly been recorded between Mid-June and August, with a single specimen collected in March.
