= Bottle (disambiguation) =

A bottle is a narrow-necked container made of an impermeable material.

Also commonly (in context) simply referred to as "bottle" is a baby bottle, used to feed infants.

Bottle or Bottles may also refer to:

== Music ==
- The Bottles, a 1970s pop duo
- "The Bottle", a song by American soul artist Gil Scott-Heron and musician Brian Jackson
- "Bottle", a song on the album DAAS Icon by the Doug Anthony All Stars

== Places ==
=== United States ===
- The Bottle, Alabama, a community in Auburn
- Bottle Mountain, a mountain in New York
- Bottle Beach, the western shore of Dead Horse Bay, Brooklyn, New York
- Bottle Beach, in Bottle Beach State Park, Washington state

=== Elsewhere ===
- Bottle Island, an island in Scotland
- Hat Khuat (Thai: หาดขวด, "Bottle Beach"), a beach in Thailand
- Bottle Lake (Nova Scotia), Canada

== Other uses ==
- The Bottle (etchings), an 1847 series of etchings by George Cruikshank
- Bottle, a character from the fourth season of Battle for Dream Island, an animated web series
- "Bottles", nickname of Ralph Capone (1894–1974), Italian-American mobster and older brother of Al Capone

== See also ==
- Bottle tree (disambiguation)
