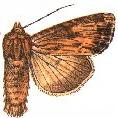

Scientific classification
- Domain: Eukaryota
- Kingdom: Animalia
- Phylum: Arthropoda
- Class: Insecta
- Order: Lepidoptera
- Superfamily: Noctuoidea
- Family: Noctuidae
- Genus: Apamea
- Species: A. lignicolora

Binomial name
- Apamea lignicolora (Guenée, 1852)

Synonyms
- Xylophasia lignicolora

= Apamea lignicolora =

Wood-coloured Quaker

Species of moth

Apamea lignicolora, the wood-coloured Quaker or wood-coloured apamea, is a moth of the family Noctuidae. The species was first described by Achille Guenée in 1852. It is native to North America, where it is distributed across much of Canada and the United States.

The wingspan is 45 to 50 mm.

The larva feeds on a various grasses, including couch grass (Agropyron repens).

== Subspecies ==
- Apamea lignicolora lignicolora
- Apamea lignicolora quaesita

Apamea atriclava was formerly considered a subspecies of A. lignicolora.
