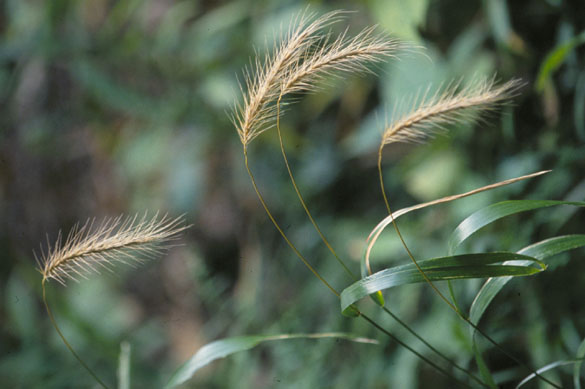

Scientific classification
- Kingdom: Plantae
- Clade: Tracheophytes
- Clade: Angiosperms
- Clade: Monocots
- Clade: Commelinids
- Order: Poales
- Family: Poaceae
- Subfamily: Pooideae
- Genus: Elymus
- Species: E. villosus

Binomial name
- Elymus villosus Muhl. ex Willd., 1809

= Elymus villosus =

Species of plant

Elymus villosus is a species of wild rye known by the common names silky wild rye, downy wild rye, or hairy wild rye. It is native to eastern North America.
