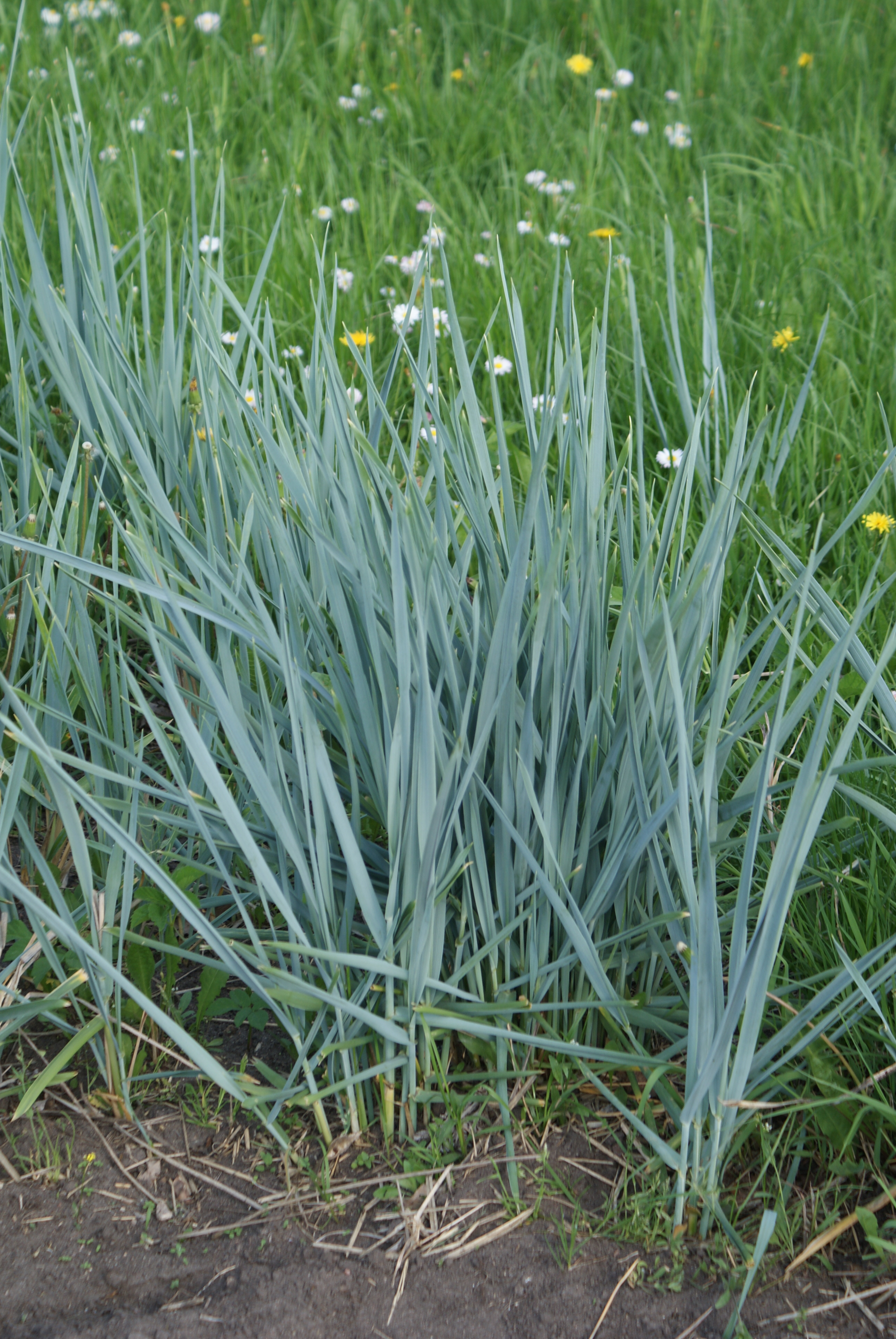

Scientific classification
- Kingdom: Plantae
- Clade: Tracheophytes
- Clade: Angiosperms
- Clade: Monocots
- Clade: Commelinids
- Order: Poales
- Family: Poaceae
- Subfamily: Pooideae
- Genus: Elymus
- Species: E. magellanicus

Binomial name
- Elymus magellanicus (Desv.) Á.Löve

= Elymus magellanicus =

Species of grass

Elymus magellanicus, the Magellan wheatgrass, is a clump-forming grass native to South America. It grows 1½-ft high and wide and has metallic blue leaves. Nearly evergreen in mild climates, it is a good container plant.

== Gallery ==
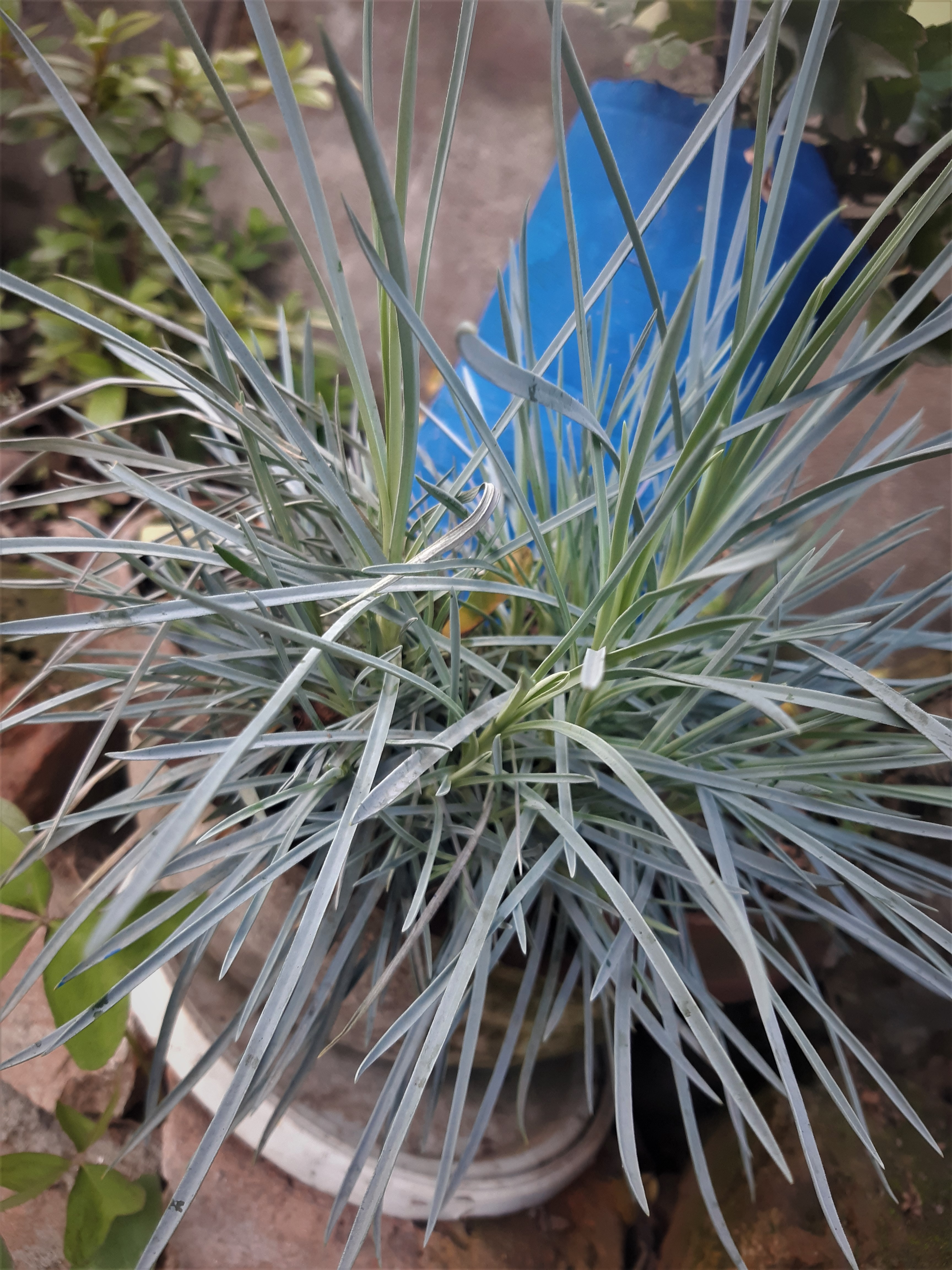
Elymus magellanicus

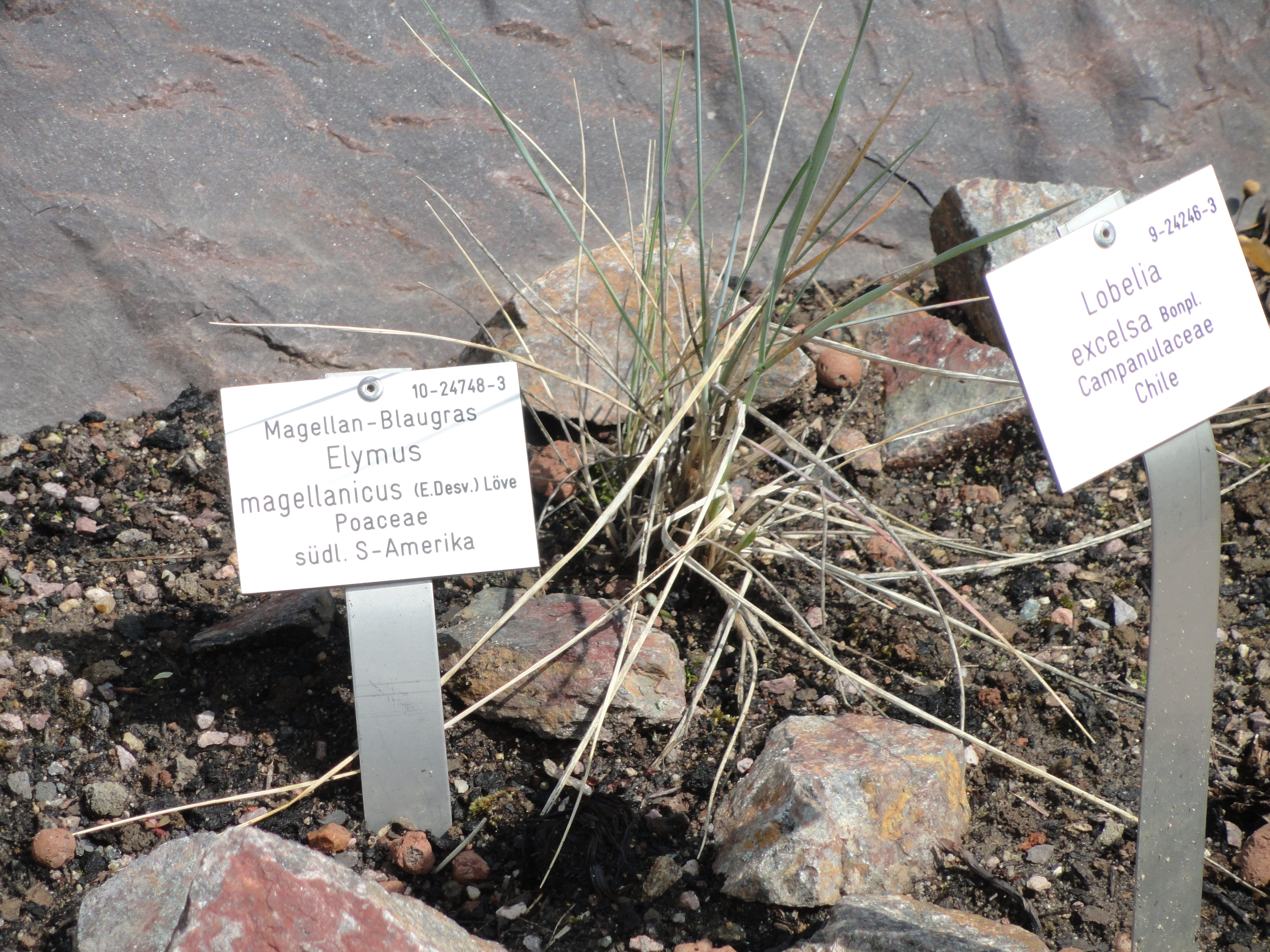
