= List of plants known as bottlebrush =

Bottlebrush is a common name used to refer to several genera of plants. These include:

- Callistemon, a genus of shrubs and trees from Australia
- Beaufortia, a genus of shrubs from Australia
- Elymus hystrix, a species of bunchgrass from North America
- Elymus californicus, a species of bunch grass from North America known as California bottlebrush grass
