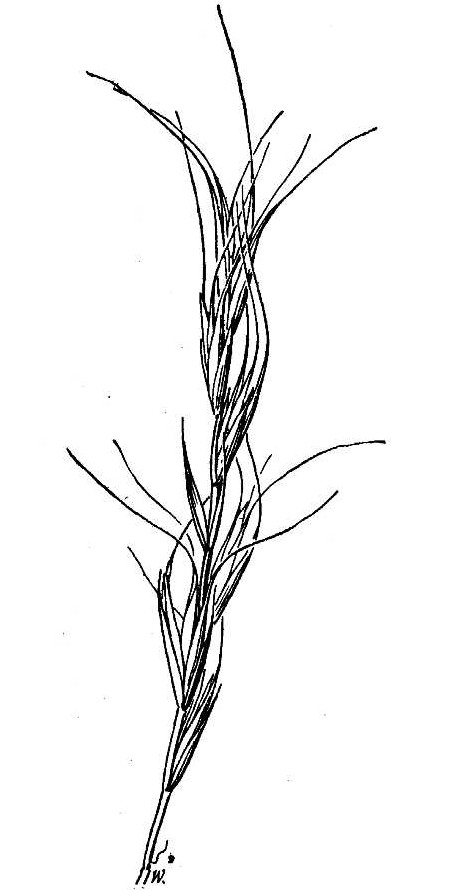

Scientific classification
- Kingdom: Plantae
- Clade: Tracheophytes
- Clade: Angiosperms
- Clade: Monocots
- Clade: Commelinids
- Order: Poales
- Family: Poaceae
- Subfamily: Pooideae
- Genus: Elymus
- Species: E. violaceus

Binomial name
- Elymus violaceus (Hornem.) J.Feilberg

Synonyms
- List: Agropyron andinum (Scribn. & J.G.Sm.) Rydb.; Agropyron atbassaricum Golosk.; Agropyron biflorum subsp. andinum (Scribn. & J.G.Sm.) Piper; Agropyron biflorum subsp. latiglume (Scribn. & J.G.Sm.) Piper; Agropyron biflorum var. hornemannii B.Fedtsch., nom. superfl.; Agropyron brevifolium Scribn.; Agropyron caninoides var. pubescens Scribn. & J.G.Sm.; Agropyron caninoides (Ramaley) Beal; Agropyron caninum subsp. latiglume (Scribn. & J.G.Sm.) Pease & A.H.Moore; Agropyron caninum subsp. majus (Vasey) C.L.Hitchc., nom. illeg.; Agropyron caninum var. andinum (Scribn. & J.G.Sm.) Pease & A.H.Moore; Agropyron caninum var. hornemannii Pease & A.H.Moore, nom. superfl.; Agropyron caninum var. latiglume (Scribn. & J.G.Sm.) C.L.Hitchc.; Agropyron caninum var. mitchellii S.L.Welsh; Agropyron caninum var. pubescens Scribn. & J.G.Sm.; Agropyron caninum var. richardsonii (Schrad.) M.E.Jones; Agropyron caninum var. tenerum (Vasey) Pease & A.H.Moore; Agropyron caninum var. unilaterale Vasey; Agropyron gmelinii var. pringlei Scribn. & J.G.Sm.; Agropyron latiglume var. alboviride Hultén; Agropyron latiglume var. andinum (Scribn. & J.G.Sm.) Malte; Agropyron latiglume var. pilosiglume Hultén; Agropyron latiglume (Scribn. & J.G.Sm.) Rydb.; Agropyron novae-angliae Scribn.; Agropyron pauciflorum subsp. majus (Vasey) Melderis; Agropyron pauciflorum subsp. novae-angliae (Scribn.) Melderis; Agropyron pauciflorum subsp. teslinense (A.E.Porsild & Senn) Melderis; Agropyron pauciflorum (Schwein.) Hitchc., nom. illeg.; Agropyron pringlei (Scribn. & J.G.Sm.) Hitchc.; Agropyron pseudorepens pseudorepens var. . & J.G.Sm.; Agropyron pseudorepens pseudorepens var. in; Agropyron repens var. novae-angliae Scribn. & J.G.Sm., pro syn.; Agropyron repens var. tenerum (Vasey) Beal; Agropyron richardsonii var. ciliatum Scribn. & J.G.Sm.; Agropyron richardsonii (Schrad.) Scribn. & J.G.Sm.; Agropyron spicatum var. pringlei (Scribn. & J.G.Sm.) M.E.Jones; Agropyron subsecundum var. andinum (Scribn. & J.G.Sm.) Hitchc.; Agropyron subsecundum (Link) Hitchc.; Agropyron tenerum subsp. magnum (Scribn. & J.G.Sm.) Piper; Agropyron tenerum subsp. magnum (Scribn. & J.G.Sm.) Piper; Agropyron tenerum subsp. majus (Vasey) Piper; Agropyron tenerum subsp. trichocoleum Piper, nom. superfl.; Agropyron tenerum var. ciliatum Scribn. & J.G.Sm.; Agropyron tenerum var. longifolium Scribn. & J.G.Sm.; Agropyron tenerum var. novae-angliae (Scribn.) Farw.; Agropyron tenerum Vasey; Agropyron teslinense A.E.Porsild & Senn; Agropyron trachycaulon Steud., pro syn.; Agropyron trachycaulum var. caerulescens Malte; Agropyron trachycaulum var. ciliatum (Scribn. & J.G.Sm.) Malte; Agropyron trachycaulum var. fernaldii (Pease & A.H.Moore) Malte; Agropyron trachycaulum var. glaucescens Malte; Agropyron trachycaulum var. glaucum (Pease & A.H.Moore) Malte; Agropyron trachycaulum var. hirsutum Malte; Agropyron trachycaulum var. latiglume (Scribn. & J.G.Sm.) Beetle; Agropyron trachycaulum var. majus (Vasey) Fernald; Agropyron trachycaulum var. novae-angliae (Scribn.) Fernald; Agropyron trachycaulum var. pilosiglume Malte; Agropyron trachycaulum var. richardsonii (Schrad.) Malte ex H.F.Lewis; Agropyron trachycaulum var. tenerum (Vasey) Malte; Agropyron trachycaulum var. trichocoleum Malte, nom. superfl.; Agropyron trachycaulum var. unilaterale (Vasey) Malte; Agropyron trachycaulum (Link) Malte ex H.F.Lewis; Agropyron unilaterale Cassidy, nom. illeg.; Agropyron violacescens (Ramaley) Beal; Agropyron violaceum subsp. andinum (Scribn. & J.G.Sm.) Melderis; Agropyron violaceum var. andinum Scribn. & J.G.Sm.; Agropyron violaceum var. latiglume Scribn. & J.G.Sm.; Agropyron violaceum var. majus Vasey; Agropyron violaceum var. virescens Lange; Agropyron violaceum (Hornem.) Lange; Crithopyrum trachycaulon Steud., pro syn.; Cryptopyrum richardsonii Heynh., pro syn.; Elymus alaskanus subsp. latiglumis (Scribn. & J.G.Sm.) Á.Löve; Elymus charkeviczii Prob.; Elymus donianus subsp. subsecundus (Link) Á.Löve & D.Löve; Elymus donianus subsp. virescens (Lange) Á.Löve & D.Löve; Elymus kamczadalorum (Nevski) Tzvelev; Elymus novae-angliae (Scribn.) Tzvelev; Elymus pauciflorus subsp. subsecundus (Link) Gould; Elymus pauciflorus (Schwein.) Gould, nom. illeg.; Elymus pringlei Scribn. & Merr.; Elymus sierrae Gould; Elymus subsecundus (Link) Á.Löve & D.Löve; Elymus trachycaulus subsp. andinus (Scribn. & J.G.Sm.) Á.Löve & D.Löve; Elymus trachycaulus subsp. glaucus (Pease & A.H.Moore) Cody; Elymus trachycaulus subsp. kamczadalorum (Nevski) Tzvelev; Elymus trachycaulus subsp. latiglumis (Scribn. & J.G.Sm.) Barkworth & D.R.Dewey, no basionym not cited.; Elymus trachycaulus subsp. major (Vasey) Tzvelev; Elymus trachycaulus subsp. novae-angliae (Scribn.) Tzvelev; Elymus trachycaulus subsp. sierrae (Gould) Á.Löve; Elymus trachycaulus subsp. stefanssonii (Melderis) Á.Löve & D.Löve; Elymus trachycaulus subsp. subsecundus (Link) Á.Löve & D.Löve; Elymus trachycaulus subsp. teslinensis (A.E.Porsild & Senn) Á.Löve; Elymus trachycaulus subsp. violaceus (Hornem.) Á.Löve & D.Löve, nom. superfl.; Elymus trachycaulus subsp. virescens (Lange) Á.Löve & D.Löve; Elymus trachycaulus var. andinus (Scribn. & J.G.Sm.) Dorn; Elymus trachycaulus var. latiglumis (Scribn. & J.G.Sm.) Beetle; Elymus trachycaulus var. major (Vasey) Beetle; Elymus trachycaulus var. unilateralis (Vasey) Beetle; Elymus trachycaulus var. violaceus (Hornem.) S.L.Welsh, nom. superfl.; Elymus trachycaulus (Link) Gould; Elymus violaceus subsp. andinus (Scribn. & J.G.Sm.) Tzvelev; Elymus violaceus subsp. latiglumis (Scribn. & J.G.Sm.) Tzvelev; Roegneria doniana var. stefanssonii Melderis; Roegneria kamczadalorum Nevski; Roegneria latiglumis (Scribn. & J.G.Sm.) Nevski; Roegneria novae-angliae (Scribn.) Jurtzev & V.V.Petrovsky; Roegneria pauciflora (Schwein.) Hyl.; Roegneria subsecunda (Link) Melderis; Roegneria trachycaulon (Link) Nevski; Roegneria violacea (Hornem.) Melderis; Roegneria virescens (Lange) Böcher, Holmen & Jakobsen; Triticum biflorum var. hornemannii W.D.J.Koch, nom. superfl.; Triticum caninum var. violaceum (Hornem.) Laest.; Triticum latiglume (Scribn. & J.G.Sm.) F.Herm.; Triticum pauciflorum Schwein.; Triticum repens var. tenerum Vasey, nom. nud.; Triticum repens var. violaceum (Hornem.) Hartm.; Triticum richardsonii Schrad.; Triticum subsecundum Link; Triticum trachycaulum Link; Triticum violaceum Hornem.; Zeia richardsonii (Schrad.) Lunell; Zeia tenera (Vasey) Lunell

= Elymus violaceus =

Species of grass

Elymus violaceus, many synonyms including Elymus sierrae, is a species of wild rye.

It is a perennial grass with stems growing 30 to 50 centimeters long and decumbent along the ground at maturity. The inflorescence is a series of single-spikelet nodes a few centimeters long, each spikelet with an outward-curved awn up to 2.5 centimeters long.

== Distribution ==
Elymus violaceus is very widely distributed, being native from eastern Siberia to the Russian Far East, and to most of North America. It has been introduced to much of Europe and temperate Asia.

== Conservation ==
Under the synonym Elymus sierrae and known as Sierra wild rye, it has been considered to be restricted to California and Nevada and vulnerable. Plants of the World Online regards Elymus sierrae as a synonym of Elymus violaceus, which has a very widespread distribution.
