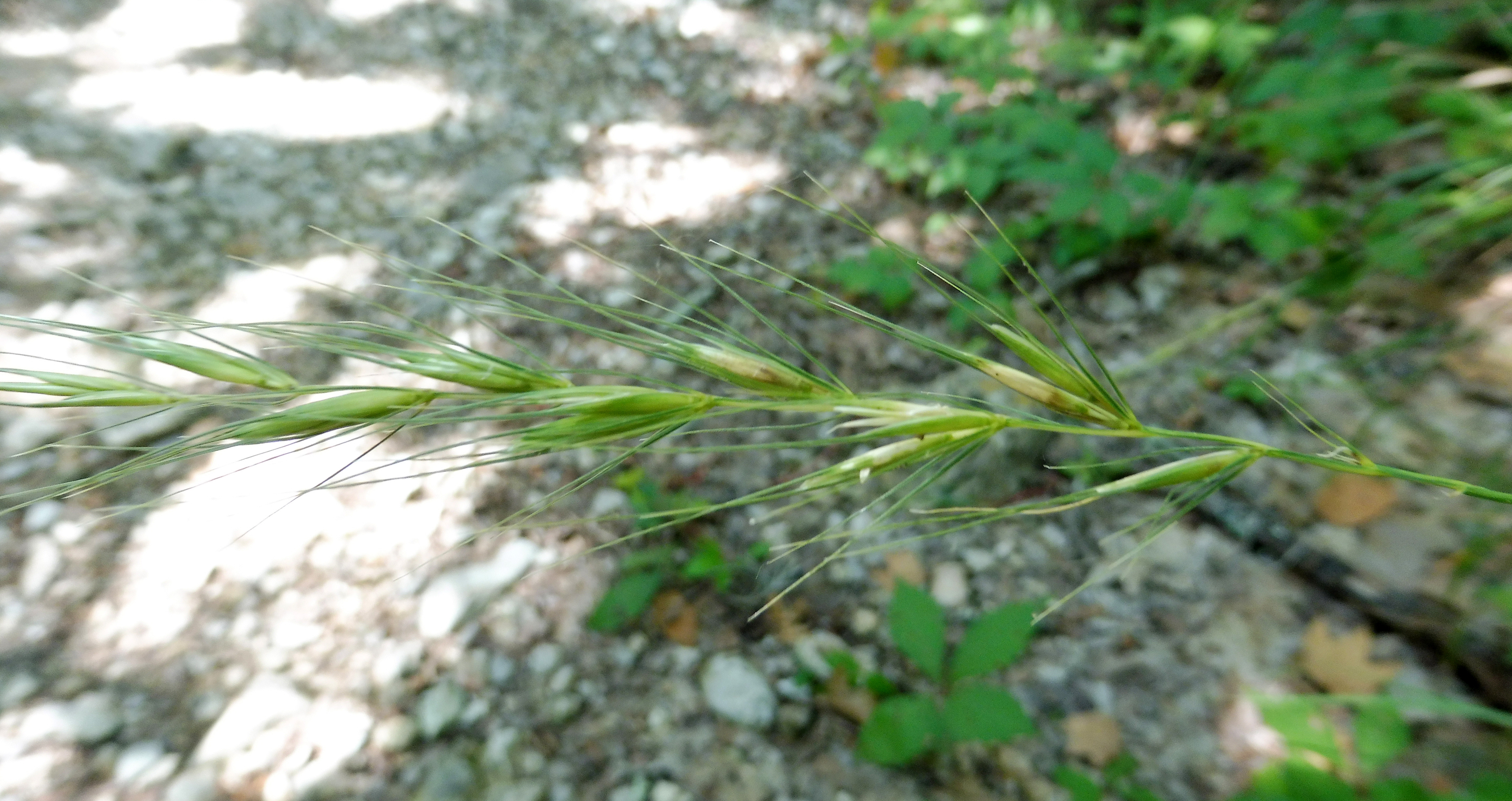

Conservation status
- Critically Imperiled (NatureServe)

Scientific classification
- Kingdom: Plantae
- Clade: Tracheophytes
- Clade: Angiosperms
- Clade: Monocots
- Clade: Commelinids
- Order: Poales
- Family: Poaceae
- Subfamily: Pooideae
- Genus: Elymus
- Species: E. texensis

Binomial name
- Elymus texensis J.J.N. Campb.

= Elymus texensis =

Species of grass

Elymus texensis, commonly called Texas wildrye, is a species of flowering plant in the grass family (Poaceae). It is native to United States, where it is endemic to the Edwards Plateau of Texas. Its natural habitat is on calcareous bluffs in Juniperus woodlands and grassy areas.

Elymus texensis is a recently discovered and poorly known species. It was described to science in 2006. It is currently only documented from three collections, although further surveys will likely reveal more localities. It appears to be most morphologically similar to Elymus pringlei, which is found further south in Mexico.
