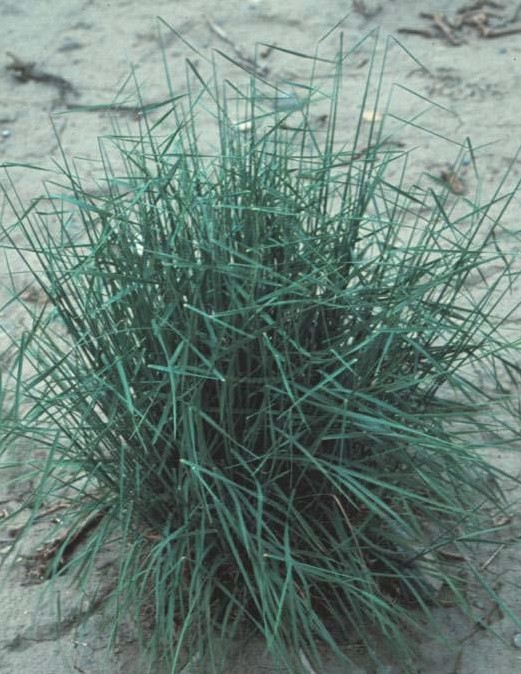

Scientific classification
- Kingdom: Plantae
- Clade: Tracheophytes
- Clade: Angiosperms
- Clade: Monocots
- Clade: Commelinids
- Order: Poales
- Family: Poaceae
- Subfamily: Pooideae
- Genus: Elymus
- Species: E. wawawaiensis

Binomial name
- Elymus wawawaiensis J. Carlson & Barkworth

= Elymus wawawaiensis =

Species of flowering plant

Elymus wawawaiensis is a species of grass known by the common name Snake River wheatgrass. It is native to western North America, where it occurs in the Pacific Northwest. It is native to eastern Washington and Oregon and parts of Idaho.

The Elymus wawawaiensis grass is long-lived and drought-tolerant. There are cultivars available, including 'Secar', which is especially tolerant of drought. Other cultivars include 'Discovery'.

== Uses ==
Elymus wawawaiensis is good for binding soil to prevent erosion. It can be added to a mix of native seed and sown on dikes and ditches. It is tolerant of cold conditions and of fire. It is also popular for use in rangeland and habitat restoration throughout the American West.

This grass is a good graze forage for livestock and wild ungulates. It can have up to 20% protein in the spring.
