= Spar (mineralogy) =

Crystal that has readily discernible faces

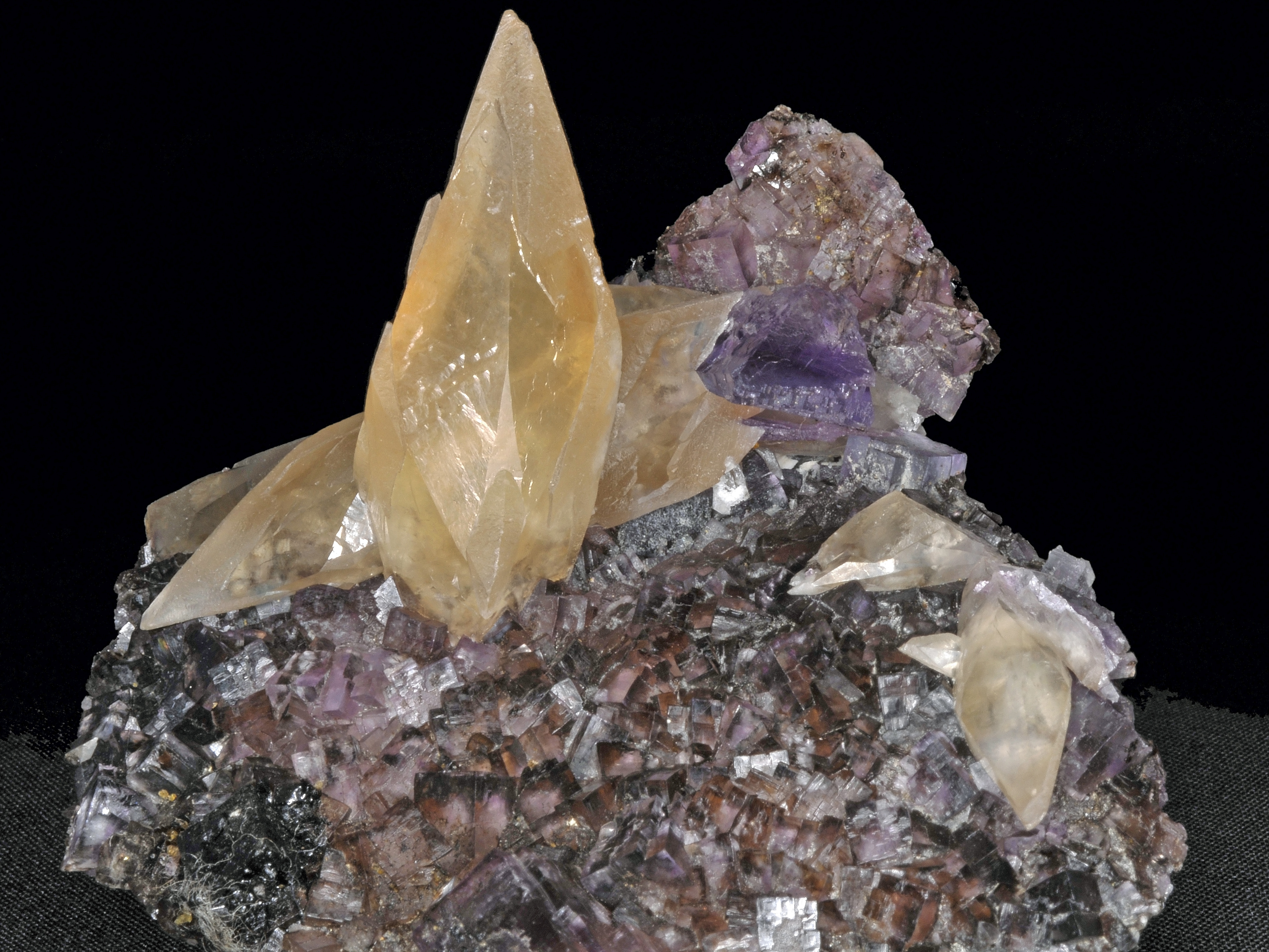
Dogtooth spar with fluorite from the Elmwood Mine in Tennessee

Spar is an old mining or mineralogy term used to refer to crystals that have readily discernible faces. A spar will easily break or cleave into rhomboidal, cubical, or laminated fragments with smooth shiny surfaces.

The various spar minerals were a historical term among miners and alchemists for any nonmetallic mineral akin to gypsum, known in Old English as spærstān, (lit. 'spear stone') referring to its crystalline projections. Thus, the word spar in mineralogy has the same root as "spear".

Amongst miners the term "spar" today is frequently used alone to express any bright crystalline substance. Most frequently, spar describes easily cleaved, lightly colored nonmetallic minerals such as feldspar, calcite or baryte. Baryte (BaSO_{4}), the main source of barium, is also called "heavy spar" (Greek "barys" means "heavy"). Calcite often forms the dogtooth spar crystals found in vugs and caves.

== Formation underwater ==
Generally, a spar will form underwater, either in a phreatic zone, or below the water table, the essential place where most caves form, or in standing pools, as pool spar. If a cave floods and a pool forms, that submerges stalactites, a formation known as bottlebrushes may form. Mineral component ions dissolved in water are mostly deposited as minerals such as calcite and gypsum, and sometimes even halite, quartz, and fluorite, through the course of thousands of years, building up on each other.

== Formation in the air ==
Sometimes, spar will form in the air due to solutions seeping out of the cave's walls or through porous sediments. When grown in the air, it is often made of gypsum or selenite. Sometimes it will form as small needles found in sediments. Other spars can be found on the tips of gypsum chandeliers.

== See also ==
- Iceland spar
