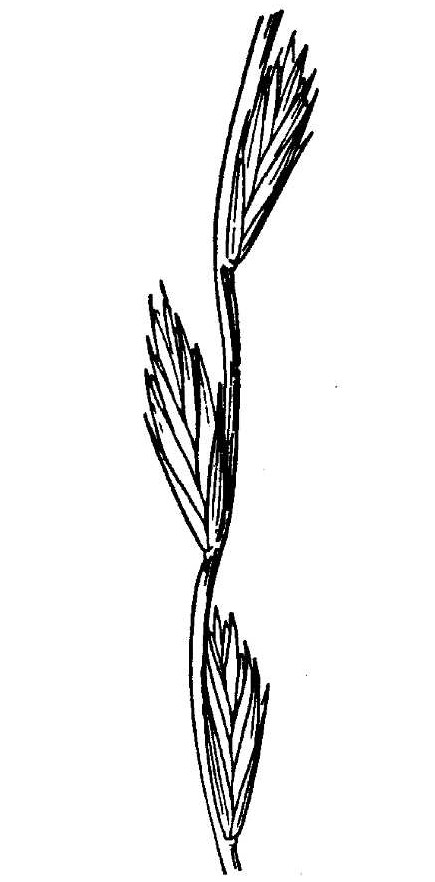

Scientific classification
- Kingdom: Plantae
- Clade: Tracheophytes
- Clade: Angiosperms
- Clade: Monocots
- Clade: Commelinids
- Order: Poales
- Family: Poaceae
- Subfamily: Pooideae
- Genus: Elymus
- Species: E. stebbinsii

Binomial name
- Elymus stebbinsii Gould

= Elymus stebbinsii =

Species of grass

Elymus stebbinsii is a species of wild rye known by the common name Parish wheatgrass. It is endemic to California, where it grows in the forests and chaparral of many of the coastal and inland mountain ranges. It is a perennial grass growing up to 1.2 meters tall. The inflorescence is a narrow, linear series of single-spikelet nodes up to 25 centimeters long. Each spikelet is up to 2 centimeters long with a short awn of just a few millimeters.
