= Kengyilia =

Scientific classification
- Kingdom: Plantae
- Clade: Tracheophytes
- Clade: Angiosperms
- Clade: Monocots
- Clade: Commelinids
- Order: Poales
- Family: Poaceae
- Subfamily: Pooideae
- Supertribe: Triticodae
- Tribe: Triticeae
- Genus: Kengyilia; C.Yen & J.L.Yang

Type species
- Kengyilia gobicola C.Yen & J.L.Yang

Genus of grasses

Kengyilia is a genus of Asian plants in the grass family. The genus is named in honor of Yi Li Keng.

Species

- Kengyilia alatavica (Drobow) J.L.Yang, C.Yen & B.R.Baum - Gansu, Xinjiang, Tibet, Mongolia, Kazakhstan, Kyrgyzstan
- Kengyilia batalinii (Krasn.) J.L.Yang, C.Yen & B.R.Baum - Xinjiang, Tibet, Mongolia, Kazakhstan, Uzbekistan, Tajikistan, Kyrgyzstan, Afghanistan
- Kengyilia eremopyroides Nevski ex C.Yen, J.L.Yang & B.R.Baum - Qinghai
- Kengyilia geminata (Keng & S.L.Chen) S.L.Chen - Qinghai
- Kengyilia gobicola C.Yen & J.L.Yang - Xinjiang
- Kengyilia grandiglumis (Keng & S.L.Chen) J.L.Yang, C.Yen & B.R.Baum - Qinghai
- Kengyilia guidenensis C.Yen, J.L.Yang & B.R.Baum - Qinghai
- Kengyilia habahenensis B.R.Baum, C.Yen & J.L.Yang - Xinjiang
- Kengyilia hejingensis L.B.Cai & D.F.Cui - Xinjiang
- Kengyilia hirsuta (Keng) J.L.Yang, C.Yen & B.R.Baum - Gansu, Qinghai, Xinjiang
- Kengyilia kaschgarica (D.F.Cui) L.B.Cai - Xinjiang
- Kengyilia kokonorica (Keng) J.L.Yang, C.Yen & B.R.Baum - Gansu, Ningxia, Qinghai, Xinjiang, Tibet
- Kengyilia kryloviana (Schischk.) C.Yen, J.L.Yang & B.R.Baum - Kazakhstan, Altai Krai
- Kengyilia laxiflora (Keng) S.L.Chen - Gansu, Qinghai, Sichuan
- Kengyilia laxistachya L.B.Cai, D.F.Cui - Xinjiang
- Kengyilia melanthera (Keng & S.L.Chen) J.L.Yang, C.Yen & B.R.Baum - Qinghai
- Kengyilia mutica (Keng & S.L.Chen) J.L.Yang, C.Yen & B.R.Baum - Qinghai
- Kengyilia pamirica J.L.Yang & C.Yen - Xinjiang
- Kengyilia pendula L.B.Cai - Qinghai
- Kengyilia pulcherrima (Grossh.) C.Yen, J.L.Yang & B.R.Baum - Kazakhstan, Uzbekistan, Turkmenistan, Iran, Turkey, Caucasus
- Kengyilia rigidula (Keng) S.L.Chen - Gansu, Qinghai, Tibet
- Kengyilia shawanensis L.B.Cai - Xinjiang
- Kengyilia stenachyra (Keng) S.L.Chen - Gansu, Qinghai
- Kengyilia tahelacana J.L.Yang, C.Yen & B.R.Baum - Xinjiang
- Kengyilia thoroldiana (Oliv.) J.L.Yang, C.Yen & B.R.Baum - Gansu, Qinghai, Xinjiang, Tibet, Sikkim
- Kengyilia zadoiensis S.L.Lu & Y.H.Wu - Qinghai
- Kengyilia zhaosuensis J.L.Yang, C.Yen & B.R.Baum - Xinjiang

formerly included

- Kengyilia leiantha - Elymus macrourus
