= Elymus macrourus =

Conservation status
- Secure (NatureServe)

Scientific classification
- Kingdom: Plantae
- Clade: Tracheophytes
- Clade: Angiosperms
- Clade: Monocots
- Clade: Commelinids
- Order: Poales
- Family: Poaceae
- Subfamily: Pooideae
- Genus: Elymus
- Species: E. macrourus

Binomial name
- Elymus macrourus (Turcz.) Tzvelev

Synonyms
- Agropyron macrourum Triticum macrourum

Species of grass

Elymus macrourus is a species of grass known by the common names tufted wheatgrass and thickspike wildrye. It is native to northwestern North America in Alaska, Yukon, and the Northwest Territories. It is also present in eastern Siberia.

This perennial grass grows in tufts of narrow, erect stems up to about 80 centimeters tall. It grows from a rhizome, resprouting to form new tufts. It also reproduces by seed.

This grass occurs in moist habitat types such as riverbanks, sand bars, and woodlands, often alongside willow species (Salix spp.). It is also associated with prickly rose (Rosa acicularis), western river alder (Alnus incana), highbush cranberry (Viburnum edule), raspberry (Rubus idaeus), northern bedstraw (Galium boreale), alpine bluegrass (Poa alpina), common fireweed (Epilobium angustifolium), Tilesius wormwood (Artemisia tilesii), and rough bentgrass (Agrostis scabra).

This grass easily colonizes disturbed habitat, such as areas recently cleared by fire. It is a useful species for revegetation in appropriate habitat. It helps prevent erosion.
