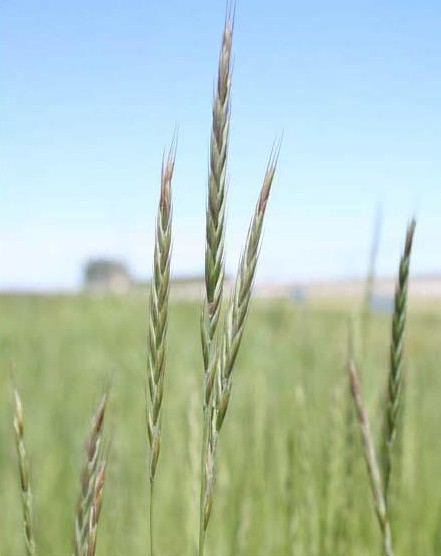
- 'NewHy'

Scientific classification
- Kingdom: Plantae
- Clade: Tracheophytes
- Clade: Angiosperms
- Clade: Monocots
- Clade: Commelinids
- Order: Poales
- Family: Poaceae
- Subfamily: Pooideae
- Genus: Elymus
- Species: E. hoffmannii

Binomial name
- Elymus hoffmannii K.B.Jensen & K.H.Asay

= Elymus hoffmannii =

Species of grass

Elymus hoffmannii is a species of grass known by the common name RS wheatgrass. It was described as a new species in 1996. It became known to science when some grasses were collected in Turkey in 1979 and one type was successfully bred out, proving to be a natural hybrid. E. hoffmannii is derived from this hybrid between Elymus repens and the bluebunch wheatgrasses (Pseudoroegneria spp.) of Turkey, such as Pseudoroegneria spicata.

This is a rhizomatous perennial grass with stems up to 1.35 m tall. The spikes are up to half a metre long with spikelets up to 2.7 cm in length. This species can be distinguished from its relative, E. repens, by its smaller rhizomes, longer leaves, and shorter awns.

This grass is used for grazing livestock. There are several cultivars available, including 'NewHy', which combines "the vigor, productivity, salt tolerance and persistence of quackgrass with the drought resistance, growth habit, seed quality and forage quality of bluebunch wheatgrass." It remains edible for livestock later in the season than other wheatgrasses, and it withstands grazing pressure. It can produce two or more hay harvests. Another cultivar is 'AC Saltlander', which is especially tolerant of higher soil salinity.
