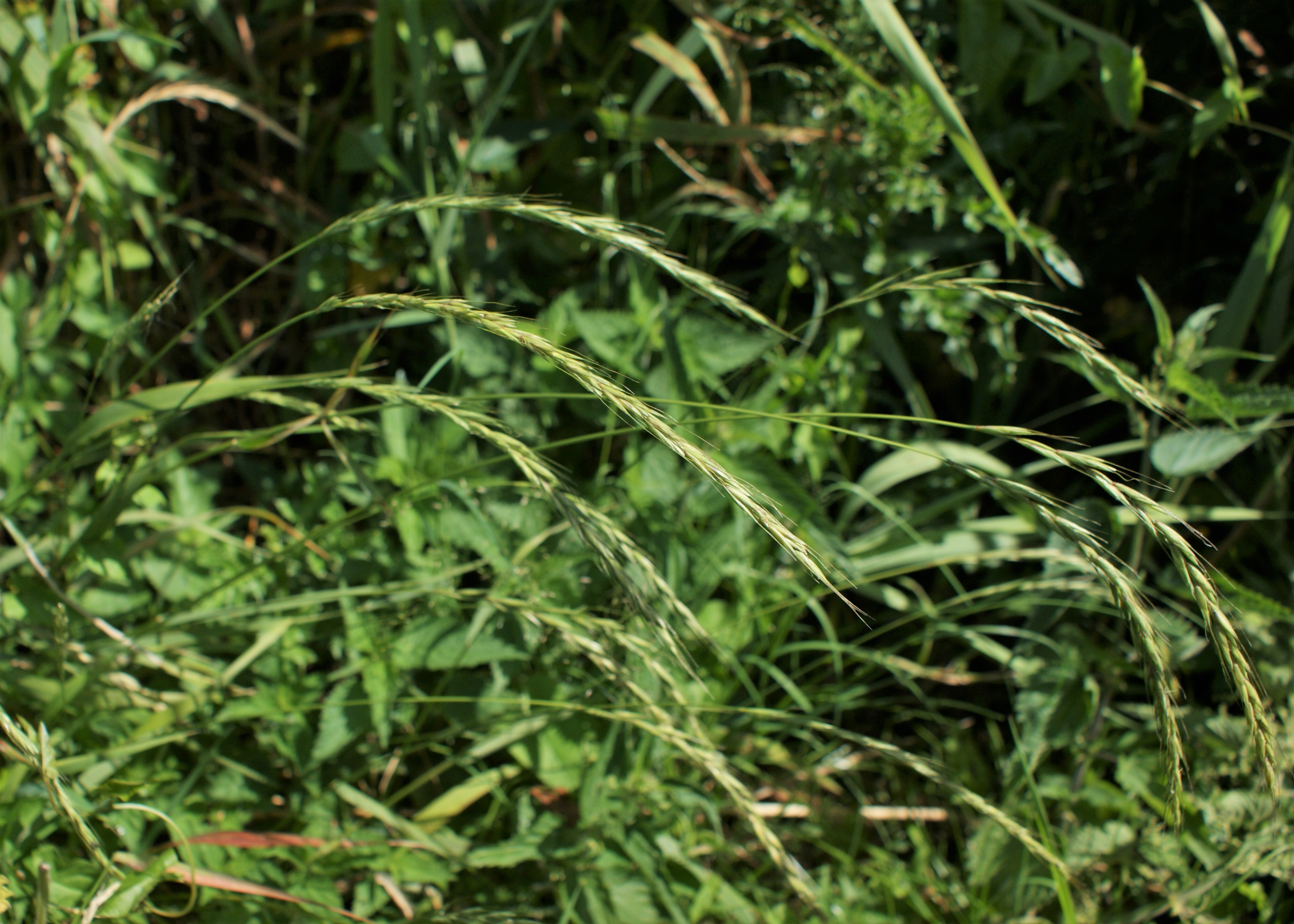

Scientific classification
- Kingdom: Plantae
- Clade: Tracheophytes
- Clade: Angiosperms
- Clade: Monocots
- Clade: Commelinids
- Order: Poales
- Family: Poaceae
- Subfamily: Pooideae
- Genus: Elymus
- Species: E. caninus

Binomial name
- Elymus caninus L.

Synonyms
- Agropyron caninum (L.) P. Beauv.; Triticum caninum L.; Roegneria canina (L.) Nevski

= Elymus caninus =

Species of grass

Elymus caninus, the bearded couch or bearded wheatgrass, is a species of flowering plant in the family Poaceae that is native to Europe including the UK but can be found introduced in the US states of Oregon and Washington. E. caninus has been observed in two morphotypes; the first population being "pauciflorum," with the second being "caninus."

Found in the forest regions throughout Europe and stretching as far as west Asia, Elymus caninus is a type of self-pollinating wheatgrass. It is described as green, lax-leafed, and caespitose. The widespread distribution of E. caninus has led to sizable differences in morphology, isozyme, prolamine, and DNA levels. Morphological differences seen throughout E. caninus populations include: the number of florets per spikelet, the length of lemma awn, and the pubescence of leaves and their sheaths. Populations from China, Italy, Pakistan, and Russia were determined to have the lowest levels of intra-population variation among E. caninus morphologies. These lower levels may be due to selection factors, population bottlenecks, genetic drift, or a combination of the bunch.

While generally a self-pollinating perennial, the rate of outcrossing varies among Elymus caninus populations. This outcrossing occurs when the species florets are open during anthesis. Researchers determined that when E. caninus is grown near or among other Elymus species (specifically studied were E. mutabilis and E. fibrosus), hybridization occurred and these hybrids were mainly found to be sterile. Populations of E. caninus grown among other Elymus species showed higher levels of variation when compared to populations grown alone. This finding shows that gene flow may be occurring between the Elymus species’ and that the gene flow is one-sided (E. mutabilis to E. caninus).

Backing up the one-sided gene flow into Elymus caninus, an introgression study of Triticum aestivum into E. caninus populations was performed in order to determine if a hybridization would occur in which no spontaneous hybridizations were shown. This concludes that an introgression of the T. aestivum traits into the E. caninus population were improbable, disregarding the fact that these populations tend to grow in the same vicinity.

Being an allotetraploid, E. caninus derives its genome (StStHH) from both new and old world Pseudoroegneria (St) as well as from the small-seeded Hordeum (H) species. A study completed in 1999 concluded that the fixed heterozygosity without segregation leads to the conclusion that E. caninus is allotetraploid by nature. A fixed heterozygosity occurs when the diploid parental genomes are homozygous for different alleles, and this trait has been reported in other Elymus species.
