= Elymus alaskanus =

Scientific classification
- Kingdom: Plantae
- Clade: Tracheophytes
- Clade: Angiosperms
- Clade: Monocots
- Clade: Commelinids
- Order: Poales
- Family: Poaceae
- Subfamily: Pooideae
- Genus: Elymus
- Species: E. alaskanus

Binomial name
- Elymus alaskanus (Scribn. & Merr.) Á.Löve

Species of grass

Elymus alaskanus, more commonly known as Alaskan wheatgrass, is an autogamous perennial that is native to North America and part of the family Poaceae. This complex is widespread and has diverged into different taxa based on morphological and cytological studies.
