= Bottle tree =

Bottle tree or bottle-tree may refer to:

- Adenium obesum subsp. socotranum, (Apocynaceae), of Socotra
- Adansonia species, the baobabs
  - Adansonia gregorii (the boab)
- Pachypodium lealii, (Apocynaceae), the bottle tree of Namibia and Angola;
- The genus Moringa, (Moringaceae), of the Madagascar spiny thickets and elsewhere;
- Brachychiton species, (Malvaceae), of Australia;
- Ceiba species, the floss silk tree or palo borracho of South America.
- Cavanillesia platanifolia (Malvaceae) of South America.
- Several genera of the Caricaceae have the habit of a "bottle tree"
- An artificial tree made of glass bottles, usually of colored glass. Associated with Hoodoo and primarily found in the Southern United States; see Hoodoo (folk magic)#Bottle tree

== See also ==
- List of plants known as bottlebrush
