= Dogtooth spar =

Large clusters of precripitated cave crystals

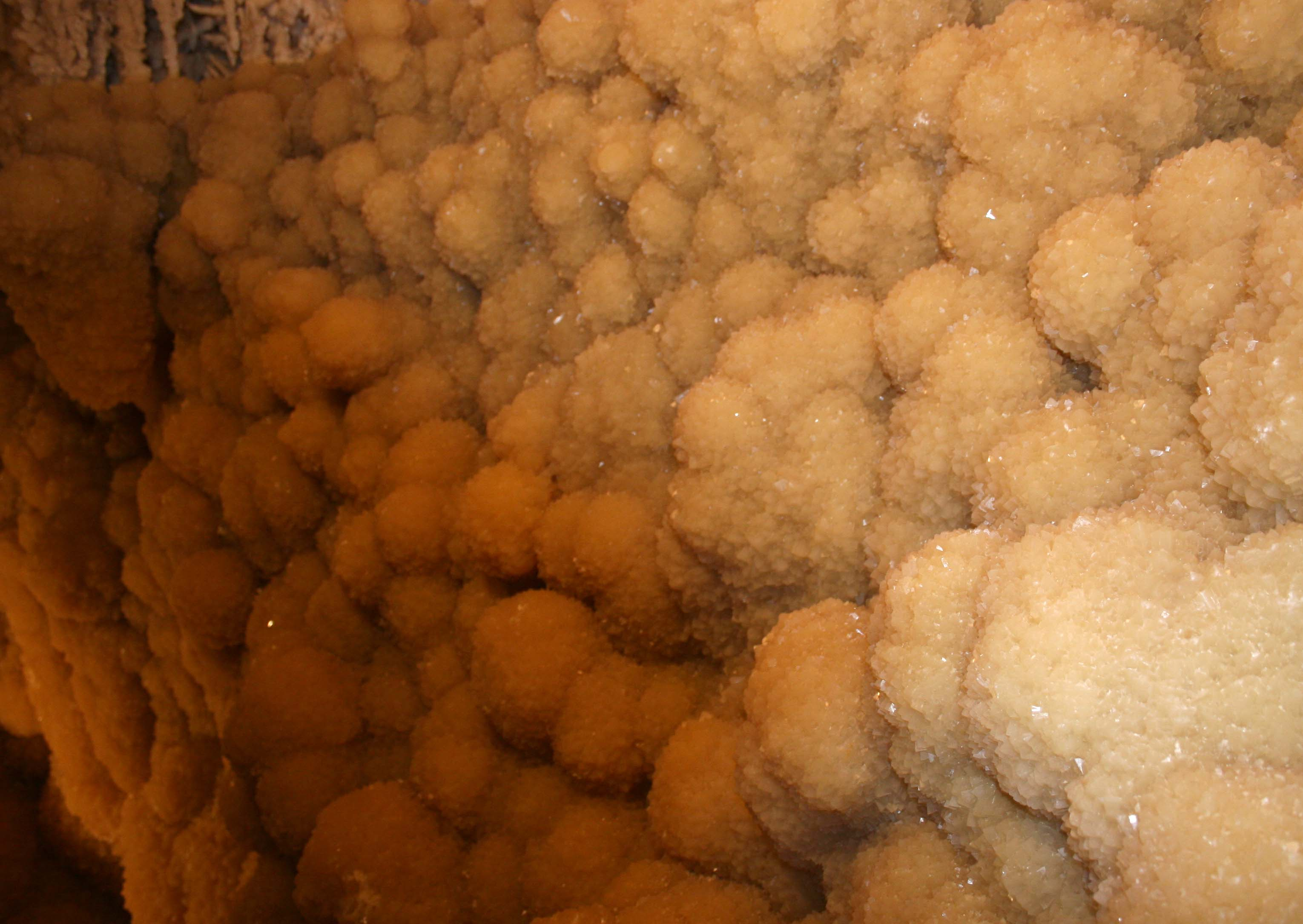
Dogtooth spar deposited on the walls of a part of the Caverns of Sonora near Sonora, Texas. The former water level can be seen in the upper left hand corner.

Dogtooth spar is a speleothem that consists of large calcite crystals that form through mineral precipitation of water-borne calcite. Dogtooth spar crystals are found in caves, open spaces including veins and fractures, and geodes. They are so named for their resemblance to dog's teeth.

The crystals are generally centimeters long, but anomalous samples decimeters long exist, notably in Sitting Bull Crystal Caverns. A layer of crystalline calcite can be found underneath the surface of crystal points.

The crystals typically consist of acute scalenohedrons, twelve triangular crystal faces that ideally form scalene triangles. However, modification of these faces is common, and some may have many more than three edges. Calcite crystallizes in the rhombohedral system, and the most common scalenohedron form has the Miller index [213̅1].

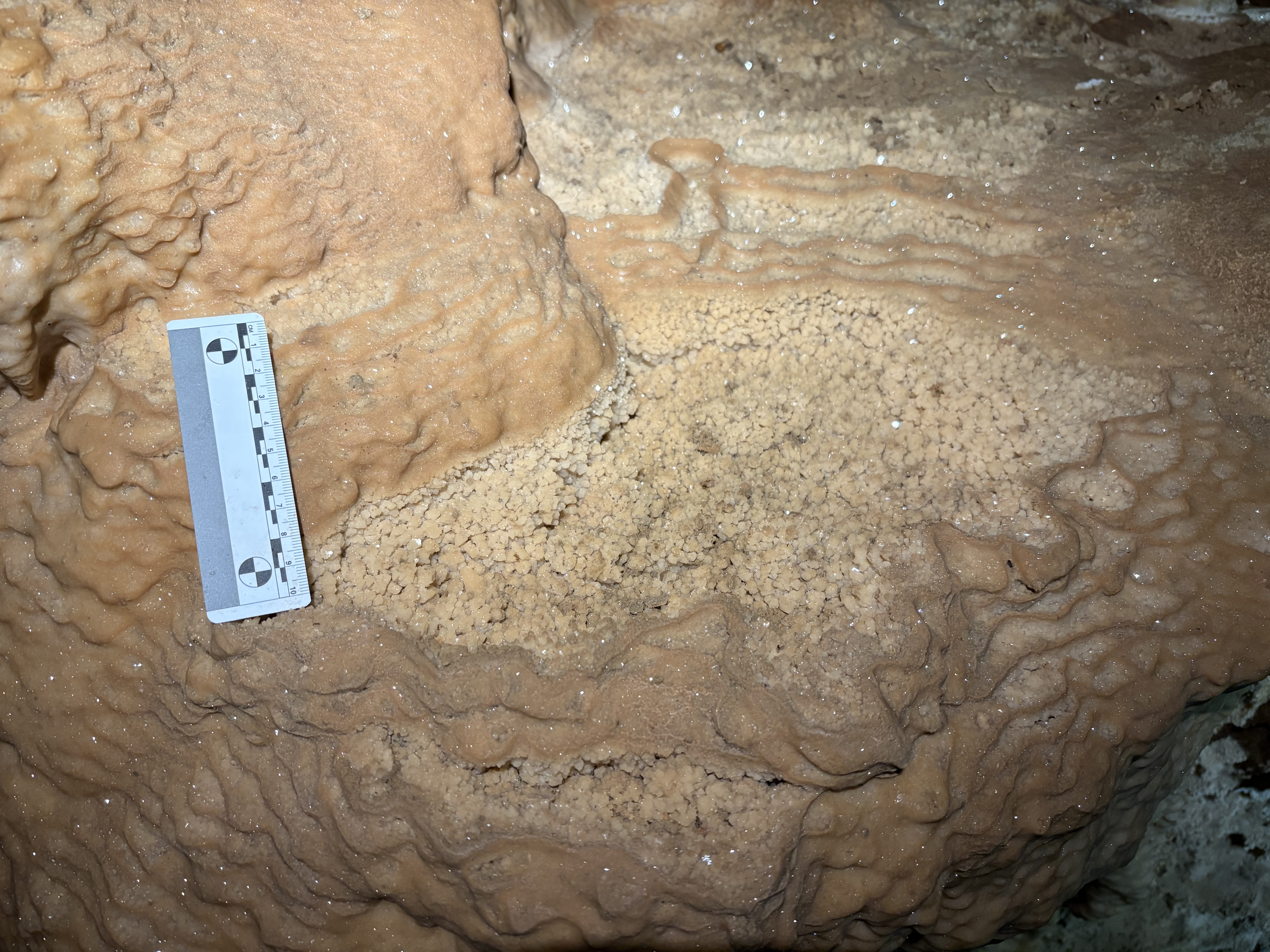
Pool spar with 10cm scale, from Bristol Caverns

Dogtooth spars can form in both a subaerial and a subaqueous manner. The subaerial variant forms when water is seeping out of the bedrock, similar to how cave crusts form. While the subaqueous variant can form in the lower phreatic section of a pool, making a phreatic spar, or in the upper oversaturated section of the pool, making a pool spar.

Spar is a general term for transparent to translucent, generally light-colored, and vitreous crystalline minerals.
