= Yi Li Keng =

Chinese botanist

Yi-Li Keng (Chinese: 耿以礼 Gěng Yi-Li; 1897, Nanjing – 1975) was a Chinese botanist, specializing in the study of grasses (the family Poaceae), particularly the tribe Triticeae of the Poaceae.

Yi-Li Keng graduated in 1927 with B.Sc. from Nanjing University (called at that time National Southeastern University). After graduation, he collected plants in Zhejiang Province with Hsen-Hsu Hu and Sung-Shu Chien. At George Washington University Keng graduated with A.M. in 1932 and Ph.D. in 1933.

His thesis, The Grasses of China (1933), provides treatments of 154 genera and 536 species.

In 1934 he became a professor and researcher at Nanjing University (called at that time Central National University) and at the Institute of Zoology and Botany, Academia Sinica. He retained his professorship for the remainder of his career, including the war years when Nanjing University's academic staff evacuated Nanjing.

Based on the specimens of the Institute of Zoology and Botany, KENG completed a study of Pleioblastus (Poaceae) in southwestern China in 1935, describing six new species.

In order to collect seeds of pasture grasses, he joined, during July and August 1935, the Roerich Expedition to Inner Mongolia. During the expedition, seeds were collected from about 50 different species of grasses, and Keng published descriptions of 6 of the species as new to science.

His son, Pai-Chieh Keng (b. 1917), also became a botanist and the two of them jointly published several works.

Keng's work in describing grasses in China was incorporated into the Chinese-language Flora Reipublicae Popularis Sinicae, an effort to complete the Flora of China. An English translation and update of the Poaceae chapter was released in 2007.

== Eponyms ==
- (Poaceae) Kengyilia C.Yen & J.L.Yang

== Selected publications ==
- Keng, Y. L. (1931). "New grasses from China". Journal of the Washington Academy of Sciences. 21 (8): 155–160. JSTOR 24523565.
- Keng, Y. L. (1931). "The Genus Chikusichloa of Japan and China". Journal of the Washington Academy of Sciences. 21 (21): 526–530. JSTOR 24525812.
- Keng, Y. L. (1940). "Oxytenanthera felix, a new species of bamboo from Yunan, China". Journal of the Washington Academy of Sciences. 30 (10): 425–426.
- Keng, Y. L. (1940). "New species and new names of grasses from Lower Yangtze Valley". Sinensia. 11 (5–6). Nanking: 407–414.
- Keng, Yi-li; Keng, Kwan-hou (1945). "Kokonoria, a new genus of Plantaginaceae from Tsinghai Province, China". Journal of the Washington Academy of Sciences. 35 (12): 374–378. JSTOR 24533208.
- Keng, Yi-Li Keng; Keng, Pai-Chieh (1946). "New bamboos from Szechwan Province, China". Journal of the Washington Academy of Sciences. 36 (3): 76–86.
- Keng, Y. L. (1958). "Two new genera of grasses from China". Journal of the Washington Academy of Sciences. 48 (4): 115–118. JSTOR 24534530.
- Keng, Yi-Li; Keng, Pai-Chieh (1965). "A New Combination of the Chinese Species in the Genus Duthiea Hackel (Gramineae)". Journal of Systematics and Evolution. 10 (2): 182.
