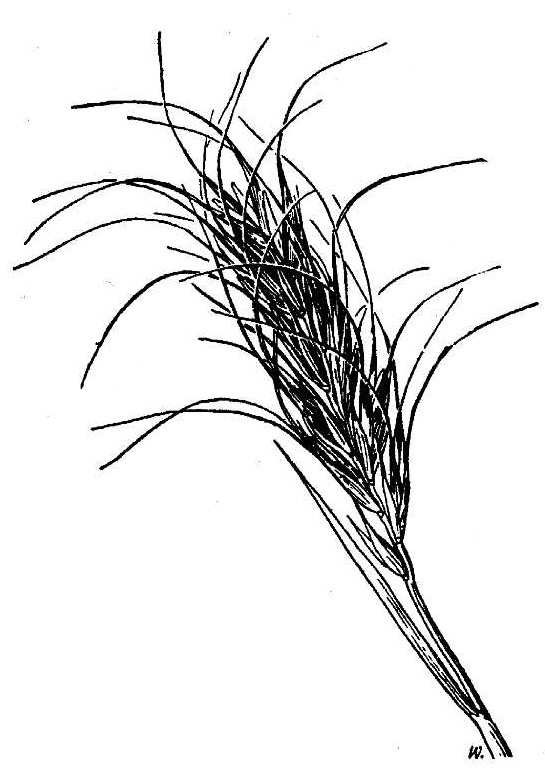

Scientific classification
- Kingdom: Plantae
- Clade: Tracheophytes
- Clade: Angiosperms
- Clade: Monocots
- Clade: Commelinids
- Order: Poales
- Family: Poaceae
- Subfamily: Pooideae
- Genus: Elymus
- Species: E. scribneri

Binomial name
- Elymus scribneri (Vasey) M.E.Jones

= Elymus scribneri =

Species of grass

Elymus scribneri is a species of wild rye known by the common names spreading wheatgrass and Scribner's wheatgrass. It is native to much of the western United States and parts of central Canada where it grows in several types of habitat including alpine mountain peaks.

== Description ==
Elymus scribneri is a perennial grass with stems reaching about half a meter long and generally lying prostrate at ground level when mature. The inflorescence is an arrangement of consecutive single-spikelet nodes which break apart when dry. Each spikelet has an awn up to 2.5 centimeters long which curves outward.
