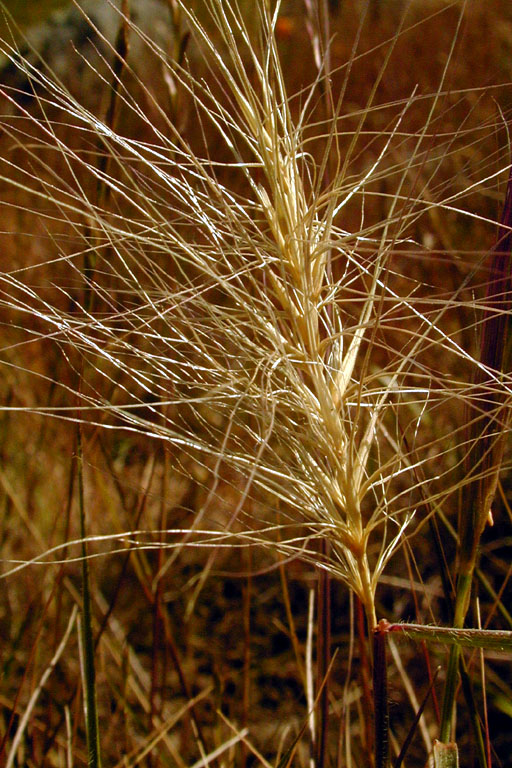

Scientific classification
- Kingdom: Plantae
- Clade: Tracheophytes
- Clade: Angiosperms
- Clade: Monocots
- Clade: Commelinids
- Order: Poales
- Family: Poaceae
- Subfamily: Pooideae
- Genus: Elymus
- Species: E. multisetus

Binomial name
- Elymus multisetus M.E.Jones

Synonyms
- Sitanion jubatum

= Elymus multisetus =

Species of flowering plant

Elymus multisetus is a species of wild rye known by the common name big squirreltail.

== Description ==
Elymus multisetus is native to the western United States where it grows in many types of habitat. It is a perennial grass reaching 60 centimeters in maximum height. The inflorescence is an array of spikelets each with several long, hairlike awns which may be up to 20 centimeters long.
