= Hat Khuat =

Beach on Koh Phangan, Thailand

Hat Khuat หาดขวด (Thai) Bottle Beach
- Beach
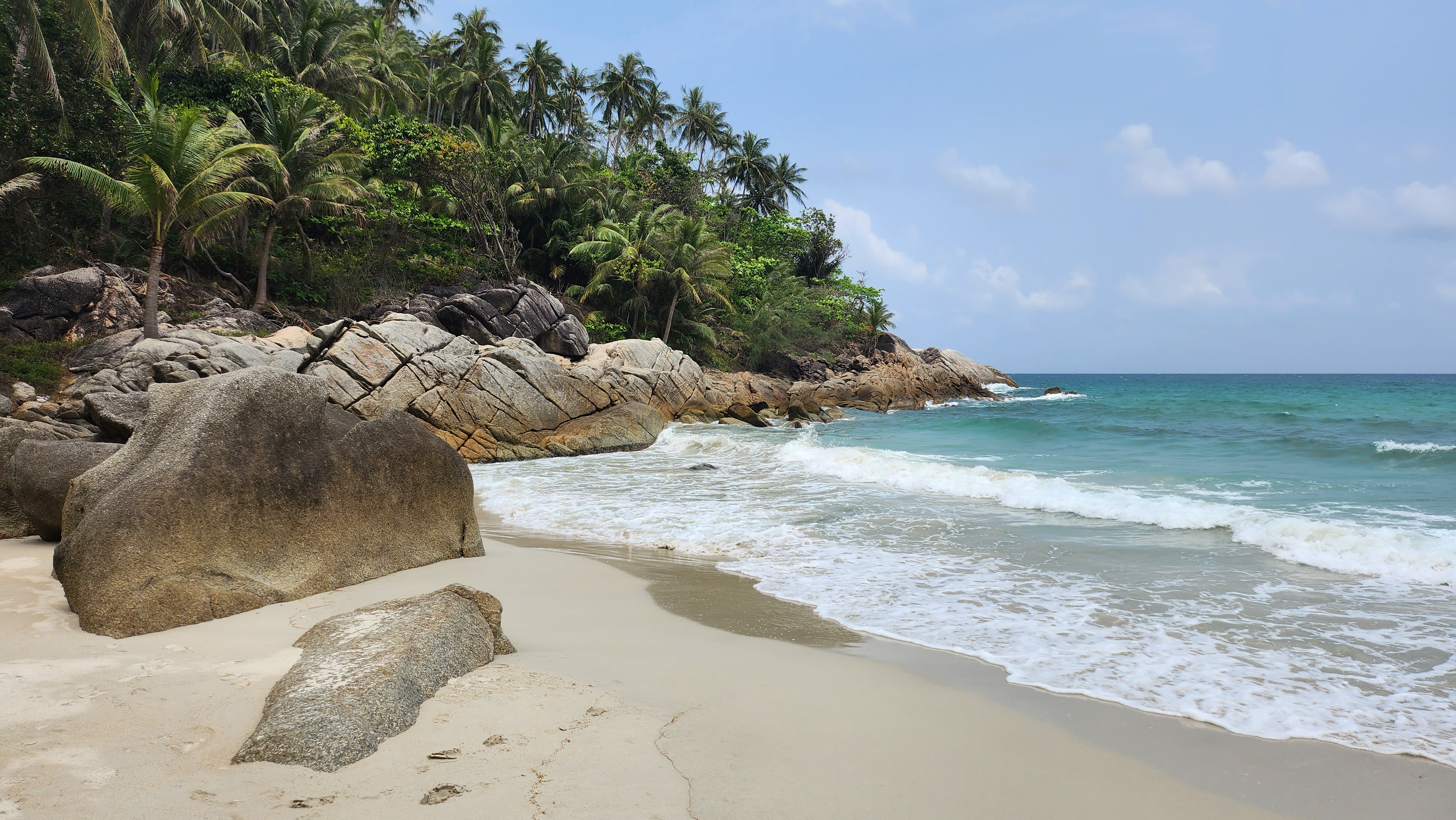

- Hat Khuat in Thailand
- Coordinates: 9.7924°N 100.0354°E
- Location: Ko Pha-ngan, Surat Thani, Thailand
- Part of: Ko Pha-ngan
- Offshore water bodies: Gulf of Thailand
- Etymology: Bottle beach

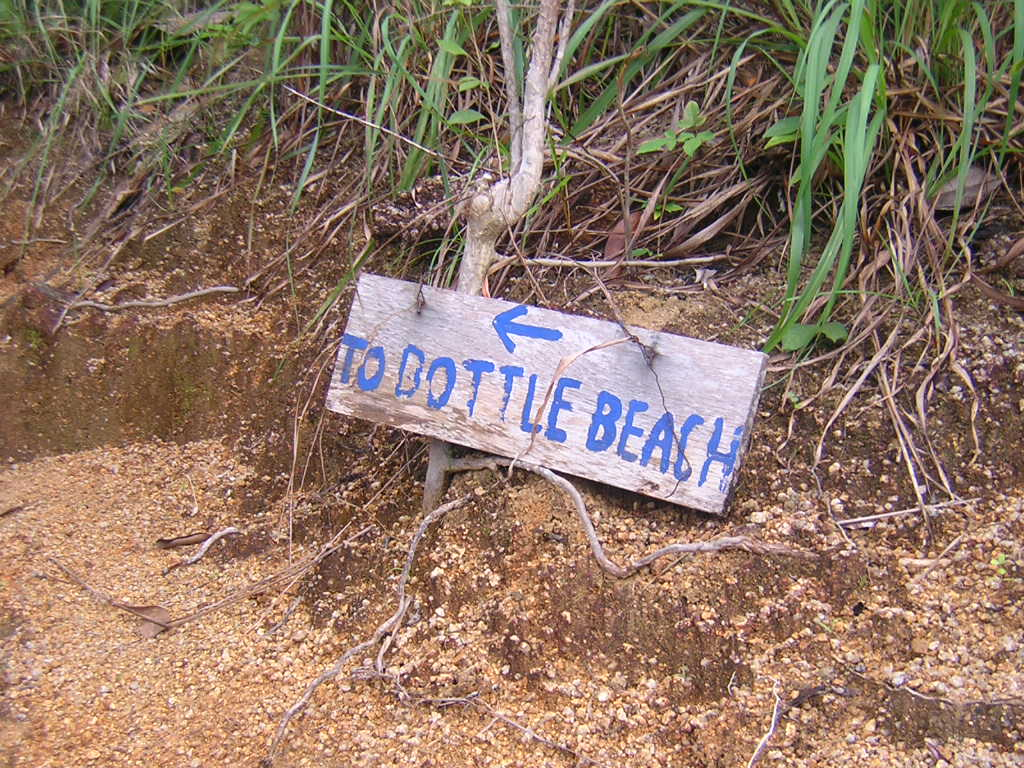
Sign marking the path to Hat Khuat

Hat Khuat (Thai: หาดขวด, "Bottle Beach") is a beach on the northern portion of Ko Pha-ngan, Thailand. It was named Bottle Beach for its protected cove and due to the shape of the cove which can be seen from the rock, which resembles the shape of a bottle. There is a rough track to the beach but it is easiest to reach by boat.
