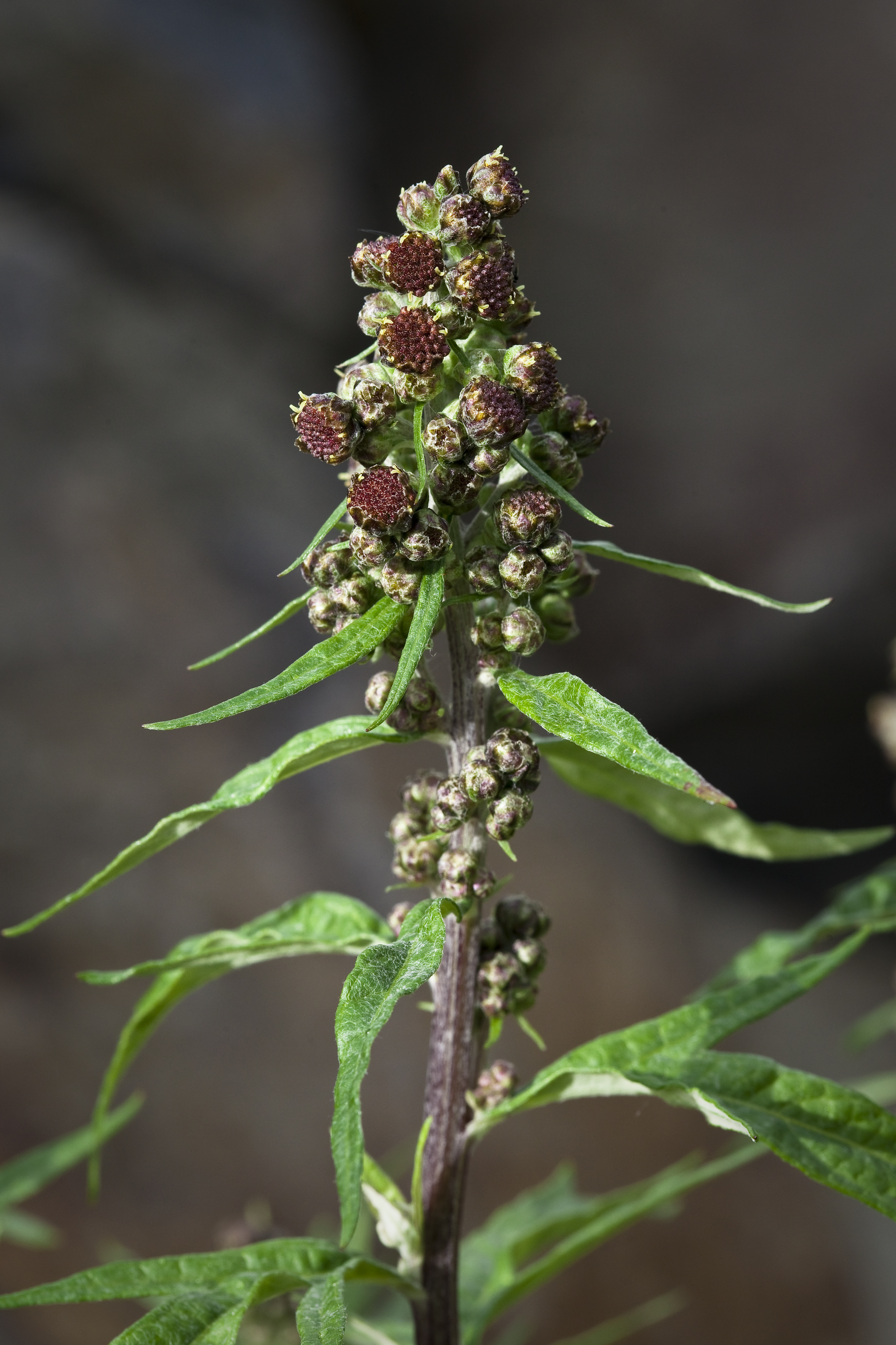
- Denali National Park and Preserve, Alaska

Conservation status
- Secure (NatureServe)

Scientific classification
- Kingdom: Plantae
- Clade: Tracheophytes
- Clade: Angiosperms
- Clade: Eudicots
- Clade: Asterids
- Order: Asterales
- Family: Asteraceae
- Genus: Artemisia
- Species: A. tilesii

Binomial name
- Artemisia tilesii Ledeb. 1814 not DC. 1838

Synonyms
- Synonymy: Artemisia elatior (Torr. & A.Gray) Rydb.; Artemisia gormanii Rydb.; Artemisia hookeriana Besser; Artemisia hultenii M.M.Maximova; Artemisia nipponica (Nakai) Pamp.; Artemisia unalaskensis Rydb.

= Artemisia tilesii =

Species of flowering plant

Artemisia tilesii is an Asian and North American species of flowering plant in the aster family. Its common names include Tilesius' wormwood, Aleutian mugwort, and stinkweed. It is native to Russia, Japan, and northern North America (from Alaska, east as far as Nunavut and south to Nevada).

== Description ==
Artemisia tilesii is a perennial herb growing from a tough rhizome. It produces one to three stems up to 80 centimeters in maximum height. The stems may be white with a coating of woolly hairs. The leaves and inflorescences are quite variable, and the species is sometimes divided into several subtaxa based on these differences. The leaves are often bicolored white and green with the distribution of hairs on the surfaces. The inflorescence may be small and compact or wide, open, and branching. Each bell shaped flower head is about half a centimeter long and lined with purplish phyllaries. It contains many yellow flowers.

The plant is aromatic, with a scent that inspired the common name "stinkweed" but is considered agreeable to some people. It can be mild or strong enough to overpower the smell of fish.

In experiments, simulated acid rain droplets were neutralized by the leaves of the plant, possibly due to the presence of various cations such as calcium.

== Uses ==
The cultivar 'Caiggluk' was developed in Alaska for use in revegetation and erosion control. It tolerates a range of soil pH and can grow on waste land made toxic by mining operations. It is easy to grow and attractive. Caiggluk is the Yupik name for the wild plant. Sargiġruaq or Salgiġruaq is the Iñupiaq name for the plant.

Artemisia tilesii has a number of historical uses in the traditional medicine systems of Alaska Native peoples. It has been used to treat fever, infection, tumors, arthritis and other joint pains, bleeding, congestion, and tuberculosis, and as a laxative and general tonic. Native American Ethnobotany. University of Michigan, Dearborn.

Native Alaskans also used A. tilesii as a deodorizer after the preparation of fish. It was used in steambaths and sweat lodges. They chewed it with tobacco and ate the roots with seal oil.
