= Bottlebrush (cave formation) =

A bottlebrush is a cave formation which results when a stalactite is immersed in rising water which is supersaturated with calcium carbonate. The stalactite becomes coated with pool spar.
