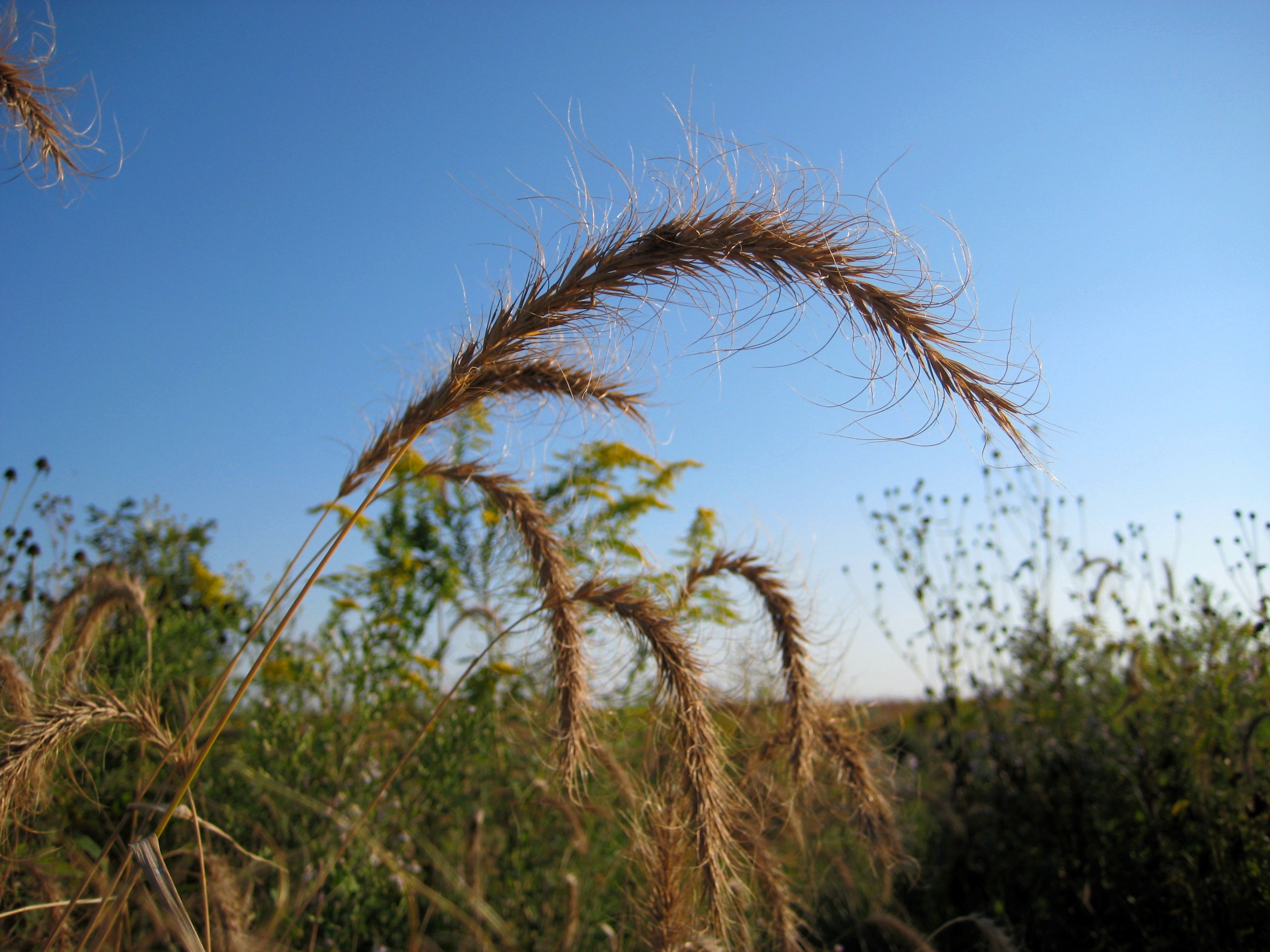
- In cultivation for habitat restoration

Conservation status
- Secure (NatureServe)

Scientific classification
- Kingdom: Plantae
- Clade: Embryophytes
- Clade: Tracheophytes
- Clade: Angiosperms
- Clade: Monocots
- Clade: Commelinids
- Order: Poales
- Family: Poaceae
- Subfamily: Pooideae
- Genus: Elymus
- Species: E. canadensis

Binomial name
- Elymus canadensis L.

Synonyms
- Clinelymus canadensis (L.) Nevski; Elymus brachystachys Scribn. & C.R.Ball; Elymus canadensis subsp. wiegandii (Fernald) Á.Löve; Elymus crescendus (Ramaley) C.F.Wheeler; Elymus glaucifolius Muhl. ex Willd.; Elymus philadelphicus L.; Elymus robustus Scribn. & J.G.Sm.; Elymus wiegandii Fernald; Hordeum canadense (L.) Asch. & Graebn.; Hordeum patulum Moench, nom. superfl.; Roegneria canadensis (L.) Hyl.; Sitanion brodei Piper; Terrellia canadensis (L.) Lunell

= Elymus canadensis =

Species of grass

Elymus canadensis commonly known as Canada wild rye or Canadian wildrye, is a species of wild rye native to much of North America. It is most abundant in the central plains and Great Plains. It grows in a number of ecosystems, including woodlands, savannas, dunes, and prairies, sometimes in areas that have been disturbed.

== Description ==
Canada wild rye is a perennial bunchgrass reaching heights of 1 to 1.5 metres (3 ft 3 in to 4 ft 11 in). It grows from a small rhizome, forms a shallow, fine root network, and is a facultative mycotroph, receiving about 25% of its nutrients on average from symbiotic mycorrhizae. Its stems are hollow and tough at maturity and bear rough, flat leaves. The leaves can reach 15 mm (0.59 in) in width and are 20 to 30 cm (8 to 12 in) in length.

The inflorescence is a nodding spike up to 25 cm (10 in) long containing 5 to 20 spikelets. Each spikelet is 1 to 2 cm (1/2 to 3/4 in) long, not counting the sharp, hard, curling awn which may exceed 3 cm (1 1/4 in) in length.

Many forms and varieties have been named, but none are accepted at Kew's Plants of the World Online.

== Genetic application ==
The gene pool of Elymus canadensis can provide information on promoting disease resistance in Hordeum vulgare (barley). In two different Elymus canadensis × Hordeum vulgare hybrid groups, the ones with Elymus canadensis cytoplasm were missing a chromosome that was homologous to the barley chromosome 7, and the ones with the Hordeum vulgare cytoplasm were missing a chromosome homologous to barley chromosome 3. The lack of each of the chromosomes in the hybrids was not random, and were caused by differences in DNA methylation. Thus, further research can use these differences in order to figure out what exactly makes Elymus canadensis so hardy, and be able to integrate its hardiness into barley so that the crop can withstand more environmental stress.

Elymus canadensis has also been shown to contain a novel high molecular weight (HMW) glutenin subunit (GS) allele. HMW-GS has been shown in wheat and other crops to determine its overall quality. Thus, further research could elaborate on the E. canadensis allele in order to improve our knowledge of HMW-GS' structural differentiation in different species, and its evolutionary history, in an attempt to increase crop quality through these alleles.

Elymus canadensis has a familiar relationship as a host with a variety of endophytic fungi. Such a symbiotic relationship could be part of the reason why E. canadensis has been so successful as a prairie grass, and may have played a large influence in the grass's evolutionary history. In fact, research suggests that the Epichloe do not hinder seed production in the host plant, so the fungi do not obstruct E. canadensis's reproduction, and may in fact aid the process. Further research can expand upon this fungal symbiotic relationship, perhaps to improve the success of agricultural crops. Specifically, research can examine if the different varieties of Epichloe will provide E. canadensis with agronomic qualities such as drought tolerance and field production. If this is supported, epichloe may be able to be used to improve the sustainability of crop populations that have a similar genetic makeup to E. canadensis.

== Use ==
Canada wild rye is sometimes used for stabilizing eroded areas and for vegetating metal-rich soils in reclaimed mines.

Elymus canadensis is an allotetraploid, which mainly reproduces by self-pollination, but can cross-pollinate with several other strains of Elymus in order to provide more genetic variation. In addition, because of its ability to cross-pollinate, new species can emerge through nature or breeding programs, thereby contributing more plants that could potentially lead to novel crops.

The cultivar 'Homestead' produces larger amounts of forage and has higher digestibility than "another adapted experimental strain" that it was compared against. The current primary use of 'Homestead' is intended for "conservation, roadside, and grassland seeding mixtures".
