= Elymus californicus =

Scientific classification
- Kingdom: Plantae
- Clade: Tracheophytes
- Clade: Angiosperms
- Clade: Monocots
- Clade: Commelinids
- Order: Poales
- Family: Poaceae
- Subfamily: Pooideae
- Genus: Elymus
- Species: E. californicus

Binomial name
- Elymus californicus (Bol.) Gould

Species of grass

Elymus californicus is a species of wild rye known by the common name California bottlebrush grass. This grass is endemic to California where it is an uncommon species known from a few counties in the San Francisco Bay Area. It grows between one and two meters in height. The tall, erect stem is nearly naked, bearing the occasional sheathing leaf with a blade 10 to 20 centimeters long. It bears an erect inflorescence which curves as it becomes heavier in grain. Each inflorescence is divided into three or four nodes with three or four spikelets per node. Each spikelet is between one and two centimeters long, not counting a long awn about two centimeters long.
