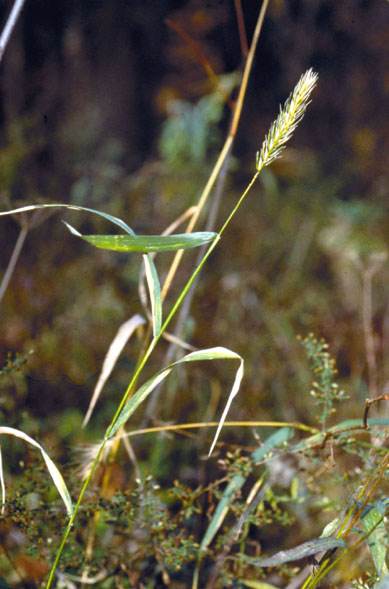

Scientific classification
- Kingdom: Plantae
- Clade: Tracheophytes
- Clade: Angiosperms
- Clade: Monocots
- Clade: Commelinids
- Order: Poales
- Family: Poaceae
- Subfamily: Pooideae
- Genus: Elymus
- Species: E. virginicus

Binomial name
- Elymus virginicus L.

= Elymus virginicus =

Species of grass

Elymus virginicus (common names Virginia wildrye, common eastern wild rye, terrell grass) is a perennial bunchgrass native to the eastern United States. Virginia wild rye is one of the few cool season native grasses found in the east Texas area. It is extremely palatable to livestock and will decrease without proper grazing management. It spreads via seed and tillering. It can be confused with Canadian wild rye which is a more robust plant with longer awns. It should be cut early in the season when used for hay to avoid ergot contamination. Northern Missouri Germplasm Virginia wild rye was released in 1999 by the Missouri Plant Material Center for use in northern Missouri.

Virginia wildrye, when sown in combination with Prairie cordgrass, has shown promise in competing with the invasive Japanese Knotweed.

== Description ==
- Cool season
- Perennial
- Bunch grass
- Variable color, green - silver blue
- 2 – 4 feet tall
- Seed head has dense, medium length awns
- Seed head 2 - 6 inches in length

Uses

- Pasture and hay
- Restoration
- Erosion control
- Wildlife habitat
- Buffer strips

Key characteristics

- Seed head remains straight at maturity
- Short, membranous, rigid ligule
- Densely awned, wheat like head
- No hair on stems or leaves
- Color variable, green waxy, blue-green or silver
- Flowers May - July

== Distribution ==
Virginia wildrye is found throughout the eastern 2/3rds of the United States and all of the southern Canadian provinces. It is typically found in moister sites than Canadian wildrye, and will tolerate more shading. It prefers heavy, fertile soils, but is extremely adaptable.
