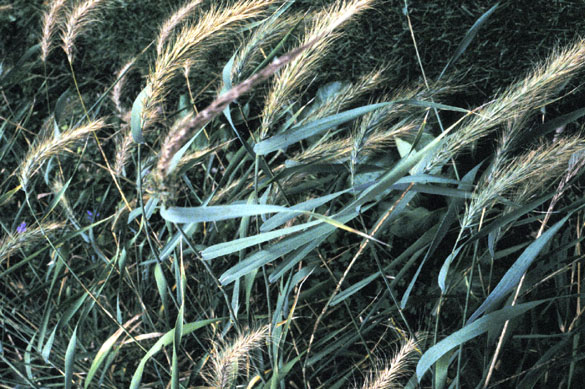
- Elymus canadensis

Scientific classification
- Kingdom: Plantae
- Clade: Embryophytes
- Clade: Tracheophytes
- Clade: Angiosperms
- Clade: Monocots
- Clade: Commelinids
- Order: Poales
- Family: Poaceae
- Subfamily: Pooideae
- Supertribe: Triticodae
- Tribe: Triticeae
- Genus: Elymus; L.

Type species
- Elymus sibiricus L.

Synonyms
- Asperella Humb.; Braconotia Godr.; Campeiostachys Drobow; Chretomeris Nutt. ex J.G. Sm. nom. inval.; Clinelymus (Griseb.) Nevski; Crithopyrum Steud.; Cryptopyrum Heynh. nom. inval.; Elysitanion Bowden nom. illeg.; Elytrigia Desv.; Elytrigium Benth.; Goulardia Husn.; Gymnostichum Schreb.; Hystrix Moench; Lophopyrum Á.Löve; Pascopyrum Á.Löve; Peridictyon Seberg; Polyantherix Nees; Psammopyrum Á.Löve; Pseudoroegneria (Nevski) Á.Löve; Roegneria K.Koch; Semeiostachys Drobow.; Sitanion Raf.; Sitospelos Adans.; Terrellia Lunell; × Elymotrigia Hyl.; × Elysitanion Bowden; × Pseudelymus Barkworth & D.R.Dewey; × Terrelymus B.R.Baum

= Elymus (plant) =

Genus of grasses

Elymus is a genus of perennial plants with approximately 150 species in the grass family, related to rye, wheat, and other widely grown cereal grains.

Elymus is a cosmopolitan genus, represented by species across all continents of the world. Common names include couch grass, wild rye and wheatgrass.

The genus name Elymus comes from the Greek ἔλυμος (élumos) "foxtail millet, Setaria italica".

== Species ==
As of 2024, Plants of the World Online accepted 173 species and 19 hybrids:

- Elymus abolinii (Drobow) Tzvelev
- Elymus aenaeanus (Hohla & H.Scholz) W.Lippert & Meierott ex Hohla
- Elymus afghanicus (Melderis) G.Singh
- Elymus africanus Á.Löve
- Elymus alaskanus (Scribn. & Merr.) Á.Löve
- Elymus albicans (Scribn. & J.G.Sm.) Á.Löve
- Elymus alienus (Keng) S.L.Chen
- Elymus alpinus L.B.Cai
- Elymus altissimus (Keng & S.L.Chen) Á.Löve ex B.Rong Lu
- Elymus amgensis Tzvelev
- Elymus angsaiensis S.L.Lu & Y.H.Wu
- Elymus angulatus J.Presl
- Elymus angustispiculatus S.L.Chen & G.H.Zhu
- Elymus anthosachnoides (Keng & S.L.Chen) Á.Löve ex B.Rong Lu
- Elymus antiquus (Nevski) Tzvelev
- Elymus × apiculatus (F.A.Tscherning) Barina
- Elymus arcuatus (Golosk.) Tzvelev
- Elymus arizonicus (Scribn. & J.G.Sm.) Gould
- Elymus atratus (Nevski) Hand.-Mazz.
- Elymus bakeri (E.E.Nelson) Á.Löve
- Elymus barbicallus (Ohwi) S.L.Chen
- Elymus barystachyus L.B.Cai
- Elymus × bobrovicus (Kotukhov) Olshanskyi
- Elymus borianus (Melderis) Cope
- Elymus × brachyphyllus (Boiss. & Hausskn.) Á.Löve
- Elymus brevipes (Keng & S.L.Chen) S.L.Chen
- Elymus burchan-buddae (Nevski) Tzvelev
- Elymus buschianus (Roshev.) Tzvelev
- Elymus cacuminis B.Rong Lu & B.Salomon
- Elymus caesifolius Á.Löve ex S.L.Chen
- Elymus caianus S.L.Chen & G.H.Zhu
- Elymus californicus (Bol. ex Thurb.) Gould, California bottlebrush grass
- Elymus canadensis L.
- Elymus caninus (L.) L.
- Elymus caucasicus (K.Koch) Tzvelev
- Elymus cheniae (L.B.Cai) G.H.Zhu
- Elymus churchii J.J.N.Campb.
- Elymus ciliaris (Trin.) Tzvelev
- Elymus clivorum Melderis
- Elymus colorans (Melderis) Á.Löve
- Elymus confusus (Roshev.) Tzvelev
- Elymus cordilleranus Davidse & R.W.Pohl
- Elymus coreanus Honda
- Elymus curtiaristatus (L.B.Cai) S.L.Chen & G.H.Zhu
- Elymus curvatiformis (Nevski) Á.Löve
- Elymus curvatus Piper
- Elymus × czilikensis (Drobow) Tzvelev
- Elymus czimganicus (Drobow) Tzvelev
- Elymus debilis (L.B.Cai) S.L.Chen & G.H.Zhu
- Elymus dentatus (Hook.f.) Tzvelev
- Elymus diversiglumis Scribn. & C.R.Ball
- Elymus dolichatherus (Keng) S.L.Chen
- Elymus dolichorhachis S.L.Lu & Y.H.Wu
- Elymus × dorei (Bowden) Barkworth & D.R.Dewey
- Elymus dorudicus (Assadi) Assadi
- Elymus durus (Keng) S.L.Chen
- Elymus duthiei (Melderis) G.Singh
- Elymus × ebingeri G.C.Tucker
- Elymus edelbergii (Melderis) O.Andersson & Podlech
- Elymus elymoides (Raf.) Swezey
- Elymus erosiglumis Melderis
- Elymus × fedoronchukii Olshanskyi
- Elymus fedtschenkoi Tzvelev
- Elymus festucoides (Maire) Ibn Tattou
- Elymus fibrosus (Schrenk) Tzvelev
- Elymus formosanus (Honda) Á.Löve
- Elymus glaberrimus (Keng & S.L.Chen) S.L.Chen
- Elymus glaucissimus (Popov) Tzvelev
- Elymus glaucus Buckley
- Elymus gmelinii (Trin.) Tzvelev
- Elymus grandis (Keng) S.L.Chen
- Elymus × hansenii Scribn.
- Elymus hirsutus J.Presl
- Elymus hitchcockii Davidse
- Elymus hoffmannii K.B.Jensen & Asay
- Elymus hondae (Kitag.) S.L.Chen
- Elymus hongyuanensis (L.B.Cai) S.L.Chen & G.H.Zhu
- Elymus hordeoides (Suksd.) Barkworth & D.R.Dewey
- Elymus humilis (Keng & S.L.Chen) S.L.Chen
- Elymus hybridus (Keng) S.L.Chen
- Elymus hystrix L.
- Elymus × incertus H.Hartmann
- Elymus × interjacens (Melderis) G.Singh
- Elymus interruptus Buckley
- Elymus intramongolicus (Shan Chen & W.Gao) S.L.Chen
- Elymus ircutensis Peschkova
- Elymus jacquemontii (Hook.f.) Tzvelev
- Elymus jacutensis (Drobow) Tzvelev
- Elymus karakabinicus Kotukhov
- Elymus kasteki (Popov) Sennikov
- Elymus khokhrjakovii Tzvelev
- Elymus kuramensis (Melderis) Cope
- Elymus lancangensis S.L.Lu & Y.H.Wu
- Elymus lanceolatus (Scribn. & J.G.Sm.) Gould
- Elymus laxinodis (L.B.Cai) S.L.Chen & G.H.Zhu
- Elymus lazicus (Boiss.) Melderis
- Elymus leiotropis (Keng) S.L.Chen
- Elymus lenensis (Popov) Tzvelev
- Elymus lolioides (P.Candargy) Melderis
- Elymus longearistatus (Boiss.) Tzvelev
- Elymus longifolius (J.G.Sm.) Gould
- Elymus macgregorii R.E.Brooks & J.J.N.Campb.
- Elymus macrochaetus (Nevski) Tzvelev
- Elymus macrourus (Turcz. ex Steud.) Tzvelev
- Elymus magellanicus (É.Desv.) Á.Löve
- Elymus magnicaespes D.F.Cui
- Elymus magniherbosus Charit.
- Elymus magnipodus (L.B.Cai) S.L.Chen & G.H.Zhu
- Elymus × maltei Bowden
- Elymus margaritae A.V.Agaf., Kobozeva & B.Salomon
- Elymus maroccanus (Font Quer & Pau) Rivas Mart., Molero Mesa, Marfíl & G.Benítez
- Elymus medius Charit.
- Elymus mendocinus (Parodi) Á.Löve
- Elymus × mossii (Lepage) Barkworth & D.R.Dewey
- Elymus multisetus (J.G.Sm.) Burtt Davy
- Elymus mutabilis (Drobow) Tzvelev
- Elymus nakaii (Kitag.) S.L.Chen
- Elymus nepalensis (Melderis) Melderis
- Elymus nipponicus Jaaska
- Elymus nodosus (Steven ex Griseb.) Melderis
- Elymus × nothus (Melderis) G.Singh
- Elymus × palmerensis (Lepage) Barkworth & D.R.Dewey
- Elymus panormitanus (Parl.) Tzvelev
- Elymus patagonicus Speg.
- Elymus pendulinus (Nevski) Tzvelev
- Elymus petrovii Tzvelev
- Elymus praeruptus Tzvelev
- Elymus probatovae Tzvelev
- Elymus pseudocaninus G.H.Zhu & S.L.Chen
- Elymus × pseudorepens (Scribn. & J.G.Sm.) Barkworth & D.R.Dewey
- Elymus puberulus (Keng) S.L.Chen
- Elymus pulanensis (H.L.Yang) S.L.Chen
- Elymus pungens (Pers.) Melderis
- Elymus purpurascens (Keng) S.L.Chen
- Elymus qingnanensis S.L.Lu & Y.H.Wu
- Elymus repens (L.) Gould
- Elymus retroflexus B.Rong Lu & B.Salomon
- Elymus rhodopaeus Delip.
- Elymus riparius Wiegand
- Elymus russellii (Melderis) Cope
- Elymus sajanensis (Nevski) Tzvelev
- Elymus × saundersii Vasey
- Elymus × saxicola Scribn. & J.G.Sm.
- Elymus scabridulus (Ohwi) Tzvelev
- Elymus scabrifolius (Döll) J.H.Hunz.
- Elymus scabriglumis (Hack.) Á.Löve
- Elymus schugnanicus (Nevski) Tzvelev
- Elymus sclerophyllus (Nevski) Tzvelev
- Elymus scribneri (Vasey) M.E.Jones
- Elymus semicostatus (Steud.) Melderis
- Elymus serotinus (Keng) Á.Löve ex B.Rong Lu
- Elymus serpentinus (L.B.Cai) S.L.Chen & G.H.Zhu
- Elymus shandongensis B.Salomon
- Elymus shirazicus Assadi
- Elymus shouliangiae (L.B.Cai) S.L.Chen & G.H.Zhu
- Elymus sibinicus Kotukhov
- Elymus sibiricus L.
- Elymus sikkimensis (Melderis) Melderis
- Elymus sinkiangensis D.F.Cui
- Elymus sinoflexuosus S.L.Chen & G.H.Zhu
- Elymus sinosubmuticus S.L.Chen
- Elymus smithii (Rydb.) Gould
- Elymus × spurius (Melderis) G.Singh
- Elymus stebbinsii Gould
- Elymus stenostachyus (Melderis) O.Andersson & Podlech
- Elymus strictus (Keng) S.L.Chen
- Elymus svensonii Church
- Elymus sylvaticus (Keng & S.L.Chen) S.L.Chen
- Elymus tenuis (Buchanan) Á.Löve & Connor
- Elymus tenuispicatus Charit.
- Elymus tenuispicus (J.L.Yang & Y.H.Zhou) S.L.Chen
- Elymus texensis J.J.N.Campb.
- Elymus tibeticus (Melderis) G.Singh
- Elymus tilcarensis (J.H.Hunz.) Á.Löve
- Elymus transhyrcanus (Nevski) Tzvelev
- Elymus trichospicula (L.B.Cai) S.L.Chen & G.H.Zhu
- Elymus troctolepis (Nevski) Tzvelev
- Elymus uralensis (Nevski) Tzvelev
- Elymus × versicolor A.P.Khokhr.
- Elymus villosus Muhl. ex Willd.
- Elymus violaceus (Hornem.) J.Feilberg
- Elymus virginicus L.
- Elymus viridulus (Keng & S.L.Chen) S.L.Chen
- Elymus vulpinus Rydb.
- Elymus wawawaiensis J.R.Carlson & Barkworth
- Elymus yangiae B.Rong Lu
- Elymus yubaridakensis (Honda) Ohwi
- Elymus × yukonensis (Scribn. & Merr.) Á.Löve
- Elymus yushuensis (L.B.Cai) S.L.Chen & G.H.Zhu
- Elymus zadoiensis S.L.Lu & Y.H.Wu
- Elymus zejensis Prob.
- Elymus zhui S.L.Chen

=== Older classifications ===
Many species once considered members of Elymus are now regarded as better suited to other genera: Agropyron, Anthosachne, Brachypodium, Cenchrus, Crithopsis, Heteranthelium, Jouvea, Kengyilia, Leymus, Psathyrostachys, Stenostachys, Taeniatherum, Thinopyrum etc.
