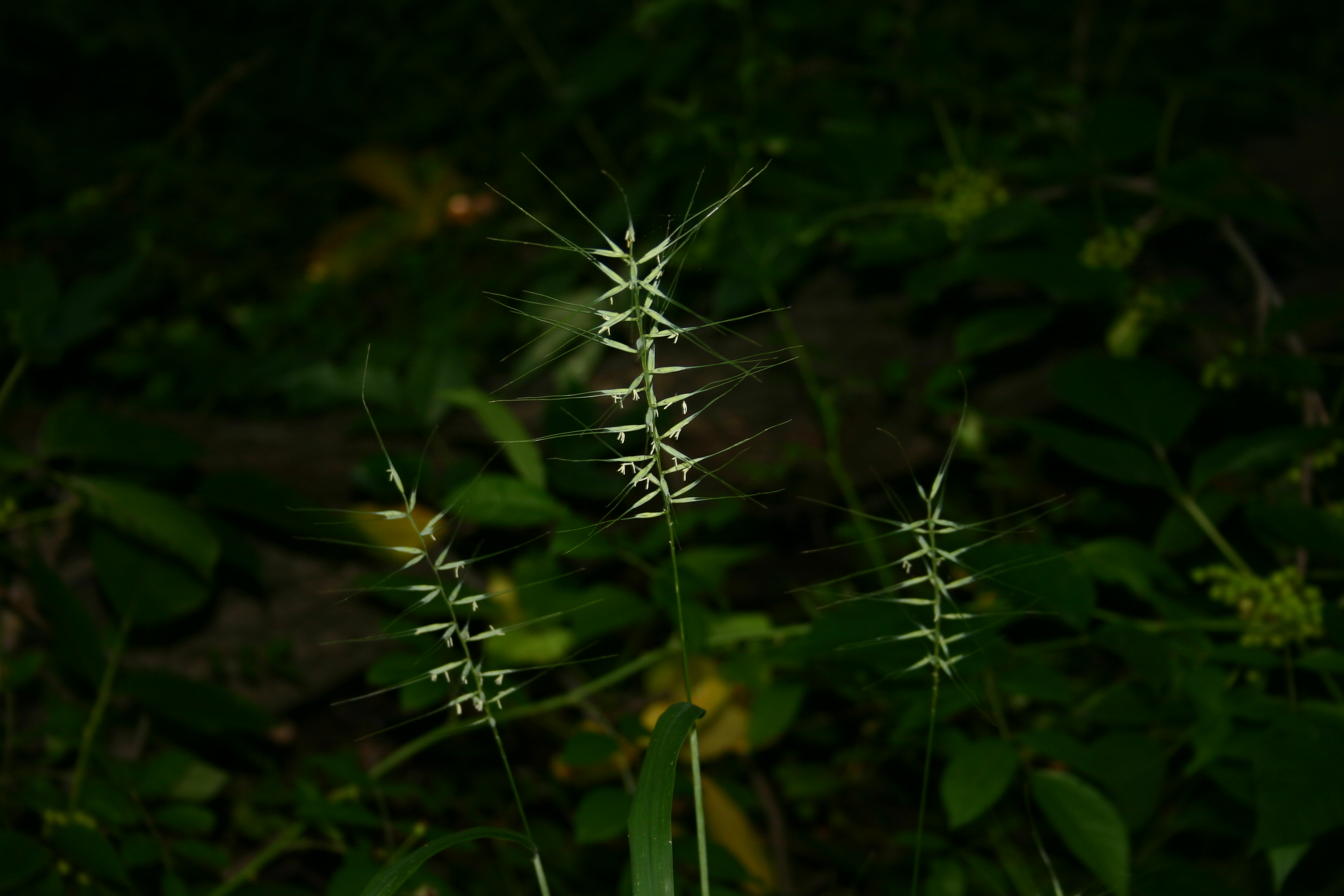
- Inflorescences

Scientific classification
- Kingdom: Plantae
- Clade: Tracheophytes
- Clade: Angiosperms
- Clade: Monocots
- Clade: Commelinids
- Order: Poales
- Family: Poaceae
- Subfamily: Pooideae
- Genus: Elymus
- Species: E. hystrix

Binomial name
- Elymus hystrix L.

Synonyms
- Hystrix patula Moench

= Elymus hystrix =

Bottlebrush grass

Species of plant

Elymus hystrix, known as eastern bottlebrush grass, or bottle-brush-grass, is a bunchgrass in the grass family, Poaceae. It is native to the Eastern United States and Eastern Canada.

== Description ==
Elymus hystrix is a herbaceous plant with alternate, simple leaves, on erect stems. The flowers are white and bloom in spring. Elymus hystrix ranges from approximately two and a half to four and a half feet in height. There are usually two spikelets at each of the five to nine nodes of the plant. Unlike some similar native grasses, the blades of Elymus hystrix do not have glumes surrounding its spikelets.

Elymus hystrix is self-compatible; that is, it can reproduce using its own pollen. Elymus hystrix is a perennial meaning it does not completely die at the end of each season, but comes back the next year.

Elymus hystrix has four copies of its genome, exhibiting a type of polyploidy called tetraploidy.

== Taxonomy ==
Elymus hystrix was first described by Carl Linnaeus in 1753. It was transferred to the new genus Hystrix as the type species Hystrix patula by Conrad Moench in 1794. Genomic studies from the 1960s onwards showed that it does in fact belong in Elymus.

== Distribution and habitat ==
Elymus hystrix is found in the United States east of the Great Plains as well as in Eastern Canada. It is usually found in rocky, wet, and partially shaded habitat such as near rivers, creeks, or woods. Elymus hystrix does not grow well in heavily shaded areas and often inhabits the regions on the edge of shaded wooded areas such as forests. Growth of Elymus hystrix appears to be inhibited by excess shade, but is relatively resistant to soil compaction when compared to other herbaceous plant species.

== Potential as a food crop ==
Mus musculus, or mice, feed on Elymus seeds. It is reasonable that through domestication and enhancement of seed size and nutritional value seeds of Elymus hystrix could be useful for consumption by other vertebrates such as humans. Similar species of grasses are eaten by livestock throughout the United States. Other Elymus species have been found to be high in crude protein when compared to other native grasses, but research is needed to investigate whether specifically Elymus hystrix also exhibits this trait. It is also not immediately evident how nutritious the herbaceous grassy portion of the plant would be to humans, but potential for Elymus hystrix as a food source for livestock is also of interest.

== Ecology ==
It is a larval host to the northern pearly eye.

== See also ==
- Bunchgrasses of North America
- Data related to Elymus hystrix at Wikispecies
