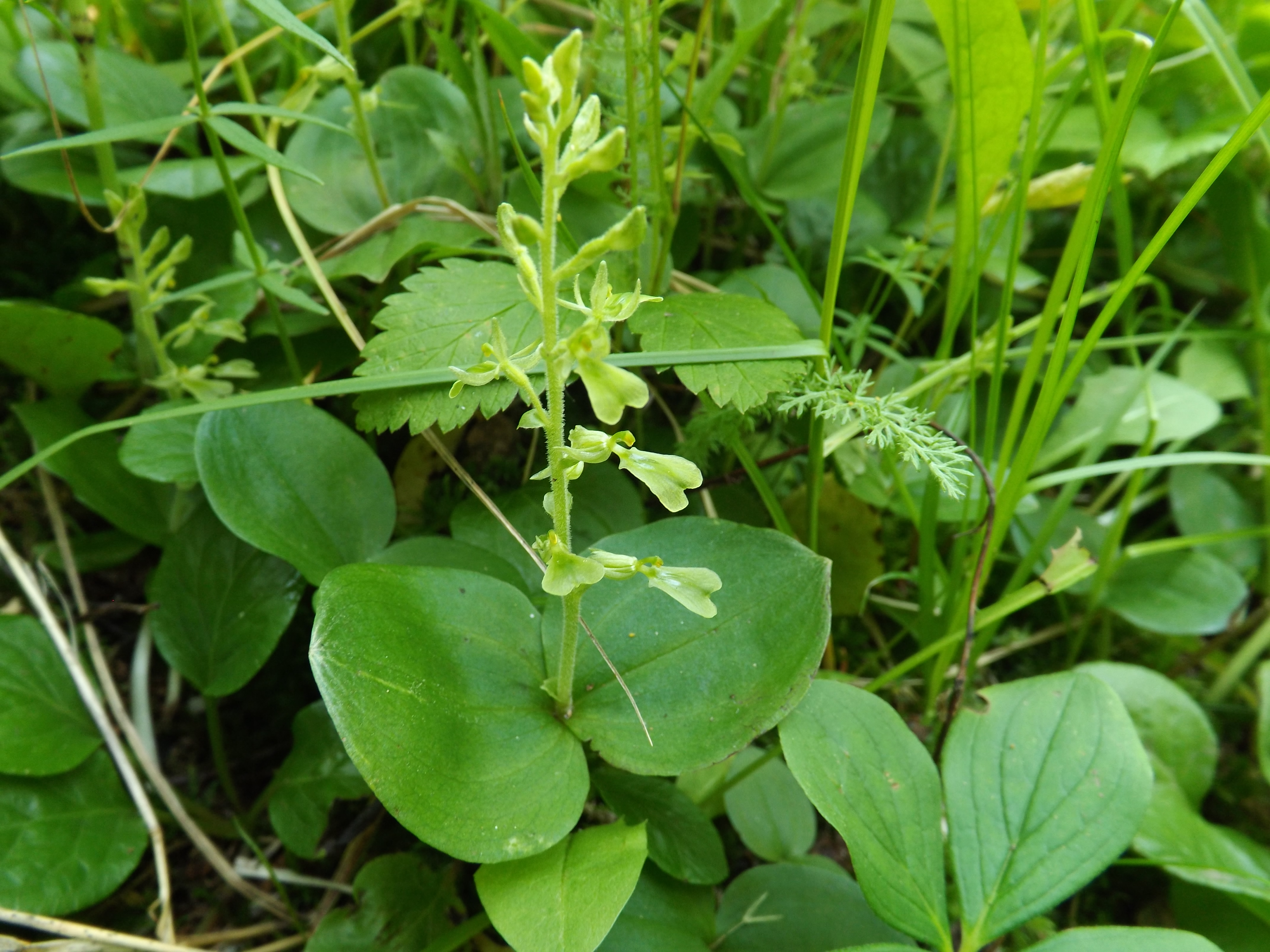

Conservation status
- Secure (NatureServe)

Scientific classification
- Kingdom: Plantae
- Clade: Embryophytes
- Clade: Tracheophytes
- Clade: Angiosperms
- Clade: Monocots
- Order: Asparagales
- Family: Orchidaceae
- Subfamily: Epidendroideae
- Genus: Neottia
- Species: N. convallarioides

Binomial name
- Neottia convallarioides (Sw.) Rich.

Synonyms
- List: Bifolium convallarioides; Diphryllum convallarioides; Epipactis convallarioides; Listera convallarioides; Listera convallarioides subsp. euconvallarioides; Ophrys convallarioides; Serapias convallarioides

= Neottia convallarioides =

Species of orchid

Neottia convallarioides is a species of orchid known by the common names broad-lipped twayblade and broad-leaved twayblade. It was formerly placed in the genus Listera, but molecular phylogenetic studies have shown that Neottia nidus-avis, the bird's-nest orchid, evolved within the same group, and all species of Listera have been moved to Neottia.

== Description ==
It is a rhizomatous perennial herb growing 10 to 35 centimeters tall. It has one pair of green oval leaves 2 to 7 cm long near the base of the stem. The inflorescence is a small raceme of green or yellow-green flowers. Each has 3 reflexed lance-shaped sepals, 2 similar petals, and a lobed, wedge-shaped labellum that measures 9 to 13 mm long. The plant sometimes forms large colonies, creating a groundcover. It is known to hybridize with Neottia auriculata.

== Taxonomy ==
Neottia convallarioides was initially given the scientific name Epipactis convallarioides by Olof Swartz in 1800. In 1817 it was moved to the genus Neottia by Louis Claude Richard, giving the species its accepted name. Together with its genus it is classified in the family Orchidaceae. It has no accepted subspecies, but there is one among its 12 synonyms.

Table of Synonyms
| Name | Year | Rank | Notes |
|---|---|---|---|
| Bifolium convallarioides (Sw.) Nieuwl. | 1913 | species | ≡ hom. |
| Diphryllum convallarioides (Sw.) Kuntze | 1891 | species | ≡ hom. |
| Diphryllum eschscholtzianum (Cham. & Schltdl.) Kuntze | 1891 | species | = het. |
| Epipactis convallarioides Sw. | 1800 | species | ≡ hom. |
| Listera convallarioides (Sw.) Nutt. | 1818 | species | ≡ hom. |
| Listera convallarioides subsp. euconvallarioides Beauverd | 1925 | subspecies | ≡ hom., not validly publ. |
| Listera convallarioides f. trifolia P.M.Br. | 1995 | form | = het. |
| Listera eschscholziana Cham. & Schltdl. | 1828 | species | = het. |
| Neottia convallarioides f. trifolia (P.M.Br.) P.M.Br. | 2019 | form | = het. |
| Neottia eschscholziana (Cham. & Schltdl.) Steud. | 1841 | species | = het. |
| Ophrys convallarioides (Sw.) W.Wight ex House | 1905 | species | ≡ hom. |
| Serapias convallarioides (Sw.) Steud. | 1821 | species | ≡ hom. |
Notes: ≡ homotypic synonym; = heterotypic synonym

== Distribution and habitat ==
Neottia convallarioides can be found in moist habitats such as woods, forests, swamps, and streambanks. It is native to much of Canada and in parts of the United States (Alaska, the Great Lakes Region, New England, and the mountains of the West: Rockies, Cascades, Sierra Nevada, etc.). It also reportedly occurs in Saint Pierre and Miquelon and on the Komandor Islands in the Bering Sea, part of the Russian Far East.
