= Neottia bifolia =

Scientific classification
- Kingdom: Plantae
- Clade: Tracheophytes
- Clade: Angiosperms
- Clade: Monocots
- Order: Asparagales
- Family: Orchidaceae
- Subfamily: Epidendroideae
- Tribe: Neottieae
- Genus: Neottia
- Species: N. bifolia

Binomial name
- Neottia bifolia (Raf.) Baumbach

Synonyms
- Listera australis Lindl.; Neottia australis (Lindl.) Rchb.f. in W.G.Walpers 1852, illegitimate homonym, not R. Br. 1810; Diphryllum bifolium Raf.; Diphryllum australe (Lindl.) Kuntze; Ophrys australis (Lindl.) House; Bifolium australe (Lindl.) Nieuwl.; Listera australis f. trifolia P.M.Br

Species of orchid

Neottia bifolia (syn. Listera australis), common name southern twayblade, is a species of terrestrial orchid found in eastern Canada (from Nova Scotia to Ontario) and the eastern United States (from Florida west to eastern Texas and north to Vermont).
