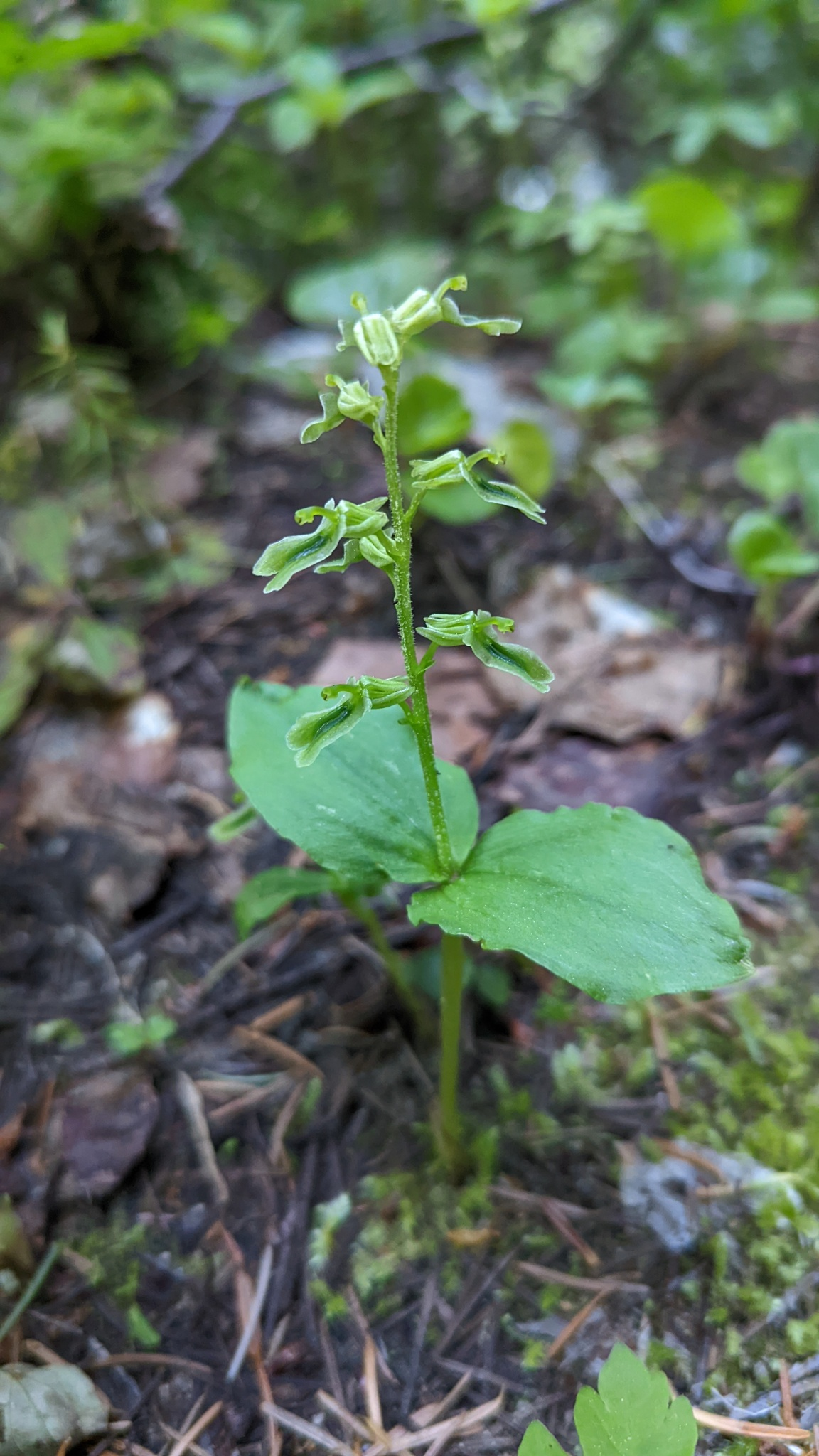

Conservation status
- Secure (NatureServe)

Scientific classification
- Kingdom: Plantae
- Clade: Tracheophytes
- Clade: Angiosperms
- Clade: Monocots
- Order: Asparagales
- Family: Orchidaceae
- Subfamily: Epidendroideae
- Tribe: Neottieae
- Genus: Neottia
- Species: N. borealis

Binomial name
- Neottia borealis (Morong) Szlach.

Synonyms
- Listera borealis Morong; Ophrys borealis (Morong) Rydb.

= Neottia borealis =

Northern twayblade

North American species of orchid

Neottia borealis (syn. Listera borealis), the northern twayblade, is a species of terrestrial orchid found in North America. It is widespread across much of Canada, including the three Arctic territories, and also occurs in the mountains of the western United States from Alaska to northern New Mexico.

== Taxonomy ==
Neottia borealis was scientifically described in 1893 by Thomas Morong who named it Listera borealis. It was moved to the genus Ophrys in 1905 by Per Axel Rydberg and finally to Neottia in 1995 by Dariusz Szlachetko. It has no accepted subspecies.
