= Kõrgessaare Nature Reserve =

Protected area in Estonia

- Location within Estonia
- Location: Estonia
- Nearest city: Kärdla
- Coordinates: 58°58′29″N 22°30′37″E
- Area: 69 ha (170 acres)

Kõrgessaare Nature Reserve is a nature reserve situated on Hiiumaa island in western Estonia, in Hiiu County.

The nature reserve has been formed to protect an area of old-growth forest, springs, coastal meadows and a karst area. It is notable for its abundance of different species of orchid; around 15 are known to grow in the nature reserve, including lesser twayblade, lady's slipper, fly orchid and musk orchid. It is also known as a breeding spot and stopover for migratory birds.
