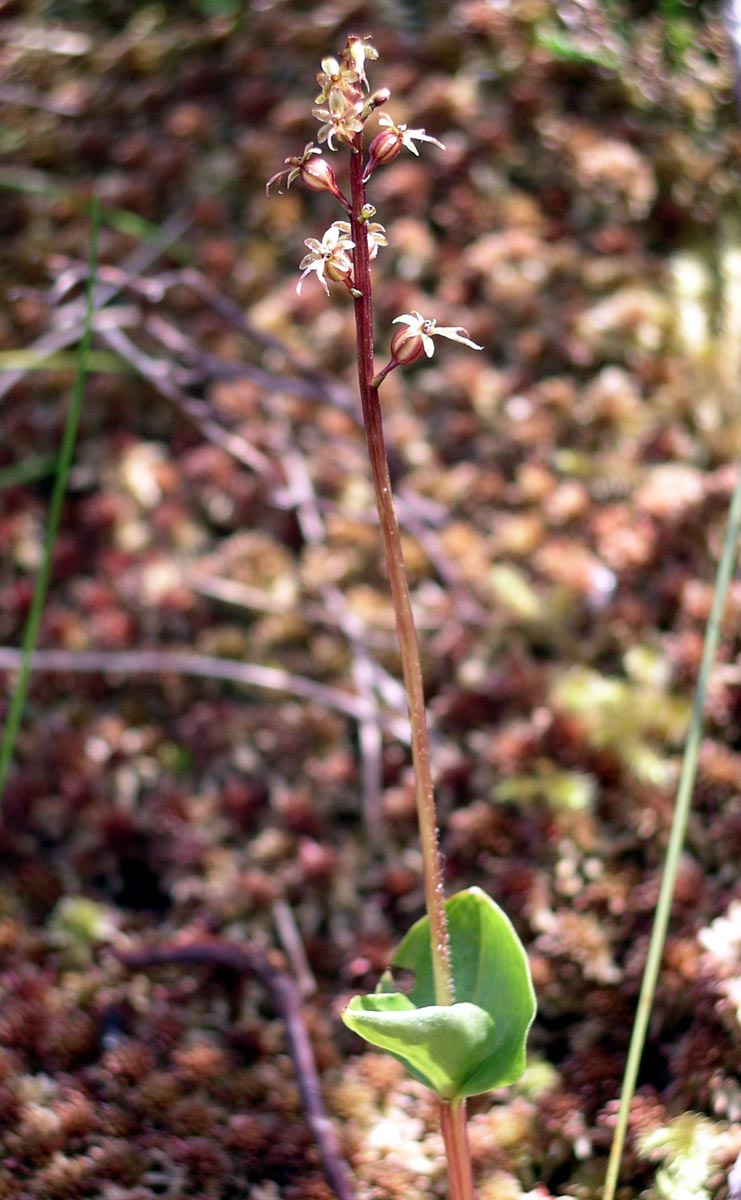

Conservation status
- Secure (NatureServe)

Scientific classification
- Kingdom: Plantae
- Clade: Tracheophytes
- Clade: Angiosperms
- Clade: Monocots
- Order: Asparagales
- Family: Orchidaceae
- Subfamily: Epidendroideae
- Genus: Neottia
- Species: N. cordata

Binomial name
- Neottia cordata (L.) Rich.

Synonyms
- List: Bifolium cordatum; Cymbidium cordatum; Diphryllum cordatum; Distomaea cordata; Epipactis cordata; Helleborine cordata; Listera cordata; Ophrys cordata; Pollinirhiza cordata; Serapias cordata

= Neottia cordata =

Species of orchid

Neottia cordata, the lesser twayblade or heartleaf twayblade, is an orchid of upland bogs and mires. It was formerly placed in the genus Listera, but molecular phylogenetic studies have shown that Neottia nidus-avis, the bird's-nest orchid, evolved within the same group.

It is never very common but may be frequently overlooked because of its small size and a tendency to grow underneath heather on sphagnum moss.

== Description ==
Heartleaf twayblade is a herbaceous plant that has flowering stems that are between 3 and 33 centimeters (1.2 and 13.0 in), though more often 5 to 10 cm (2.0 to 3.9 in). Usually each plant has just one flowering stem, but rarely there can be as many as three. The stem is hairless, succulent, and green to purple–red; it is clasped by the leaves about a third to halfway up a flowering stem or at the top of a non-flowering stem.

The glossy green leaves are a shiny dark-green on the upper side and ovate to cordate, shaped like an egg or like a heart. They measure 0.9–4 cm long by 0.7–3.8 cm wide, although they are usually less than 2 cm long and wide. Very often there are two leaves that are almost paired, but very rarely a single stem will have as many as four leaves.

The inflorescence most often has three to fifteen blooms on the upper 1.5 to 4 cm of the stem, but they will sometimes have as many as 25 flowers. The flowers are quite small, measuring just 2–3 millimeters across. The petals are yellow-green, green, or reddish purple. The smell of the flowers is quite strong. Botanists have described it as, "truly repulsive," and resembling, "molluscs beginning to go bad."

== Taxonomy ==
Neottia cordata was given the scientific name Ophrys cordata in 1753 by Carl Linnaeus. In 1817 Louis Claude Richard moved the species to the genus Neottia, creating what became the species accepted name. Though until the 2000s it was generally placed in the genus Listera. The similarity between the two groups due to flower structure was long recognized, but formerly all the species in Neottia lacked chlorophyll. Studies of the genetics showed they should be united into one genus. Together with its genus it is classified in the family Orchidaceae. The name Neottia cordata is listed as accepted in Plants of the World Online, World Flora Online, the Database of Vascular Plants of Canada, and World Plants. However, the name Listera cordata is still encountered in some sources such as the Flora of North America.

It has no accepted subspecies, but there are two in its 31 synonyms.

Table of Synonyms
Name	Year	Rank	Notes
Bifolium cordatum (L.) Nieuwl.	1913	species	≡ hom., nom. illeg.
Cymbidium cordatum (L.) Londes	1811	species	≡ hom.
Diphryllum cordatum (L.) Kuntze	1891	species	≡ hom.
Distomaea cordata (L.) Spenn.	1825	species	≡ hom.
Epipactis cordata (L.) All.	1785	species	≡ hom.
Helleborine cordata (L.) F.W.Schmidt	1793	species	≡ hom.
Listera cordata (L.) R.Br.	1813	species	≡ hom.
Listera cordata f. appendiculata Honda	1946	form	= het.
Listera cordata var. chlorantha Beauverd	1925	variety	= het.
Listera cordata f. crassa V.N.Vassil.	1957	form	= het.
Listera cordata f. disjuncta Lepage	1946	form	= het.
Listera cordata subsp. japonica (H.Hara) F.Maek.	1971	subspecies	= het.
Listera cordata var. japonica H.Hara	1938	variety	= het.
Listera cordata subsp. nephrophylla (Rydb.) Á.Löve & D.Löve	1965	subspecies	= het.
Listera cordata var. nephrophylla (Rydb.) Hultén	1937	variety	= het.
Listera cordata f. pallida C.G.H.Thed.	1889	form	= het.
Listera cordata f. rubescens P.M.Br.	1995	form	= het.
Listera cordata f. tenuis V.N.Vassil.	1957	form	= het.
Listera cordata f. tetraphylla Lavoie	1984	form	= het.
Listera cordata f. trifolia (Asch. & Graebn.) Pauca & Stefur.	1972	form	= het.
Listera cordata f. trifolia P.M.Br.	1995	form	= het., nom. illeg.
Listera cordata lusus trifolia Asch. & Graebn.	1907	sport	= het.
Listera cordata f. variegata P.M.Br.	1995	form	= het.
Listera cordata f. viridens P.M.Br.	1995	form	= het.
Listera nephrophylla Rydb.	1900	species	= het.
Neottia cordata f. rubescens (P.M.Br.) P.M.Br.	2019	form	= het.
Neottia nephrophylla (Rydb.) Szlach.	1995	species	= het.
Ophrys cordata L.	1753	species	≡ hom.
Ophrys nephrophylla (Rydb.) Rydb.	1905	species	= het.
Pollinirhiza cordata (L.) Dulac	1867	species	≡ hom.
Serapias cordata (L.) Steud.	1821	species	≡ hom.
Notes: ≡ homotypic synonym; = heterotypic synonym

=== Names ===
The species name, cordata, is Botanical Latin meaning "heart shaped". Similarly, it is known by the common name heart-leaved twayblade. Other common names include heartleaf twayblade, western heart-leaved twayblade, lesser twayblade, and simply twayblade. Although, Neottia ovata is also known as twayblade.

== Distribution ==
It has a circumpolar distribution being found in Europe, Asia and large parts of North America. In the United Kingdom its distribution is largely western and northern, becoming most common in the western Highlands of Scotland, Snowdonia in Wales, and the Lake District and the Pennines in England, but also a small population as far south as Exmoor.

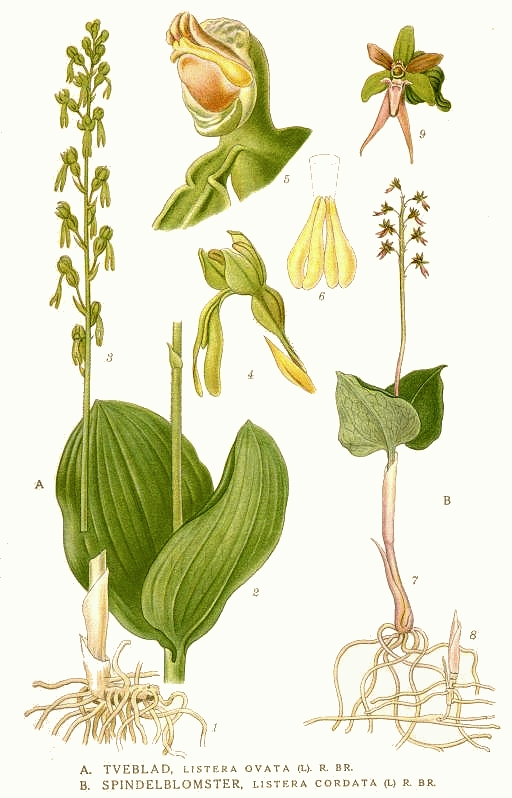
Neottia cordata (as Listera cordata) from Bilder ur Nordens Flora

== Ecology ==
The flowers produce nectar and are pollinated principally by fungus gnats in the groups Mycetophilidae and Sciaridae.

Mycorrhizal partners are almost exclusively fungi in the Sebacinales clade Serendipitaceae. There may also be some association with Ceratobasidiaceae and/or Tulasnellaceae.
