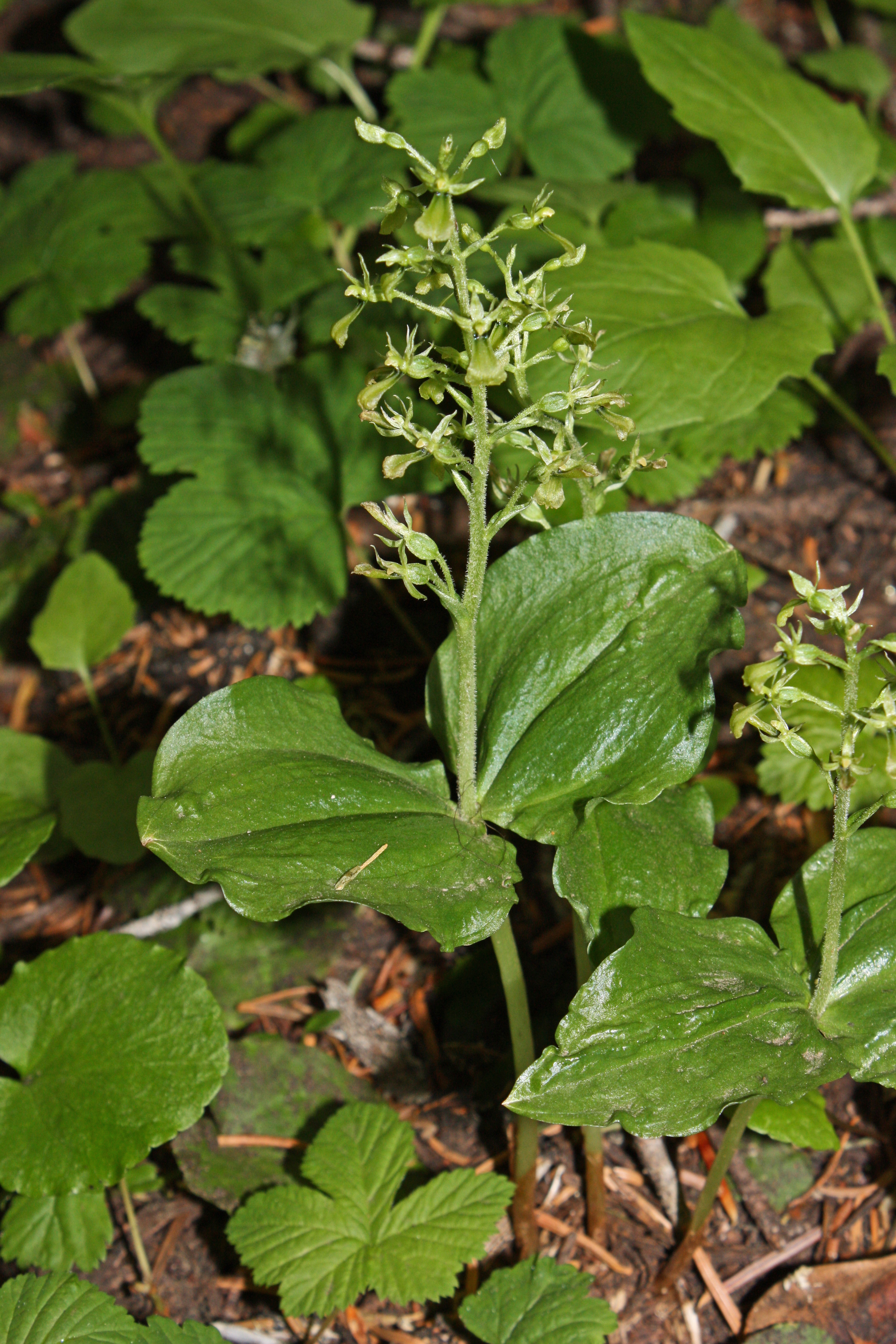
- Listera caurina in Mount Rainier National Park

Scientific classification
- Kingdom: Plantae
- Clade: Tracheophytes
- Clade: Angiosperms
- Clade: Monocots
- Order: Asparagales
- Family: Orchidaceae
- Subfamily: Epidendroideae
- Genus: Neottia
- Species: N. banksiana

Binomial name
- Neottia banksiana (Lindl.) Rchb.f.

Synonyms
- Listera banksiana Lindl.; Listera caurina Piper; Neottia caurina (Piper) Szlach.; Ophrys caurina (Piper) Rydb.

= Neottia banksiana =

Species of orchid

Neottia banksiana is a species of orchid known by the common name northwestern twayblade. It was formerly placed in the genus Listera, but molecular phylogenetic studies have shown that Neottia nidus-avis, the bird's-nest orchid, evolved within the clade formerly containing only Listera species, so all species of Listera have been formally moved to Neottia, the older genus. Some continue to refer to this species by its previous genus; older scientific names include Listera banksiana and Listera caurina.

Neottia banksiana is native to northwestern North America from Alaska through the Pacific Northwest to the Grand Teton Range of Wyoming and to Mendocino County, California. It can be found in moist, dim habitat, such as mountain forest understory. It is a rhizomatous perennial herb growing erect 10 to 30 centimetres (4 to 12 in) tall. It has one pair of green oval leaves each up to 7 centimetres (3 in) long near the base of the stem. The inflorescence is a small raceme of green or yellow-green flowers. Each has usually 3 lance-shaped sepals, 2 similar petals, and one petal known as the lip, which is longer and rounded at the end.
