= Neottia confusa =

Conservation status
- Critically Endangered (IUCN 3.1)

Scientific classification
- Kingdom: Plantae
- Clade: Tracheophytes
- Clade: Angiosperms
- Clade: Monocots
- Order: Asparagales
- Family: Orchidaceae
- Subfamily: Epidendroideae
- Genus: Neottia
- Species: N. confusa

Binomial name
- Neottia confusa Bhaumik

Species of orchid

Neottia confusa is a critically endangered species of orchid endemic to northeastern India. It was found in three small clusters in temperate and subalpine forests in the Dihang-Dibang Biosphere Reserve. Discovered in 2010 and described in 2012, it was named for its small, undivided lip, atypical among other Neottia species.

== Description ==
Neottia confusa is a terrestrial orchid found on the forest floor. It reaches a height of 12–15.5 centimetres (5–6 in), with less variation in height as compared to other Neottia species. The stem is ridged, with a pair of oppositely arranged cauline leaves toward its base. The leaves are sessile (attached without stalks) and oval shaped with rounded apices, measuring 8–12 millimetres (0.3–0.5 in) long and 6–11 millimetres (0.2–0.4 in) wide.

Flowering and fruiting occur from July to August. Between 15 and 20 flowers are arranged in a raceme at the end of the stem. These flowers are greenish and 3–4 millimetres (0.12–0.16 in) long. The peduncle, a stalk supporting the inflorescence, is 5–22 millimetres (0.2–0.9 in) in length, circular in cross-section, and covered in glandular hairs. Each individual flower is borne on a pedicel subtended by two to three acuminate (narrow-ended) bracts, although these are sometimes absent. Their pedicels and ovaries are smooth and together about 2–3 millimetres (0.08–0.1 in) in length.

As with other orchids, the flowers of N. confusa have three sepals and three petals, with the median petal called the labellum or lip. The lateral petals are oblong to elliptical, with a rounded apex, 2.2 by 1 millimetre (0.09 in × 0.04 in). The lip is simple and triangular, measuring around 1.2–1.5 by 1 millimetre (0.05 in–0.06 in × 0.04 in). The lip has a very small claw (the stalklike base of the lip) with the mesochile (middle portion of the lip) narrowing into an undivided epichile (the labellum tip). The sepals are similar in shape to the lateral petals but vary in size: the dorsal sepal is 2–2.5 by 0.8–1.3 millimetres (0.08 in–0.1 in × 0.03 in–0.05 in), while the lateral sepals are slightly smaller, at 1.8–2 by 0.6–1 millimetre (0.07 in–0.08 in × 0.02 in–0.04 in). Like with other orchids, the reproductive parts of the flower are fused, forming a structure called the column. In N. confusa, the column is straight and 0.8–1 millimetre (0.03–0.04 in) long.

== Taxonomy ==
Neottia confusa was first collected in July and August 2010 during a botanical survey in the Dihang-Dibang Biosphere Reserve. The collector, Indian botanist M. Bhaumik, later compared collections of Neottia from the survey with species descriptions and determined that the type specimens of N. confusa and N. dihangensis represented new species, which he described in 2012. The epithet confusa refers to the flower's unusual lip morphology, which differs from the bilobed or heavily emarginate (with a long central notch) lip shapes characteristic of most other members of the genus.

N. confusa belongs to the genus Neottia, which contains both autotrophic and myco-heterotrophic plants. N. confusa is autotrophic, and also has smaller lips than other species in the genus. Since the 1990s, Neottia has been combined with Listera, which for much of the 19th and 20th centuries was considered a separate genus. N. confusa has been described as intermediate between the species originally classified as Listera and Neottia. It bears the closest similarities to Neottia taizanensis, although the small lips and undivided epichile most closely resemble Neottia acuminata and Neottia taibaishanensis.

== Distribution and conservation ==
Neottia confusa is known only from the type locality, a region occupying 4 square kilometres (1.5 sq mi) in the Dihang-Dibang Biosphere Reserve in the Upper Siang district of Arunachal Pradesh. The area has an elevation of 3,200–3,800 metres (10,500–12,500 ft) and is located within the temperate to subalpine biome. It grows in moist moss on the forest floor alongside other herbaceous plants, including Neottia acuminata and Juncus, with an canopy dominated by Rhododendron and Abies.

When N. confusa was first discovered in 2010, three groups of 10–15 mature individuals were observed; no subsequent populations have been documented. The IUCN has estimated the global population as consisting of 40–50 plants but recognises that research is needed in order to establish a more accurate estimate of the population size and population trends. Because the plant's known range is contained entirely in a remote protected area, Bhaumik proposed assessing its conservation status as least concern in his 2012 description of the species. While no immediate threats to the conservation of N. confusa have been identified, the small number of known occurrences of the plant led to its classification as critically endangered under Criterion D by the IUCN. As with all other orchids, its trade is regulated under the CITES treaty.
