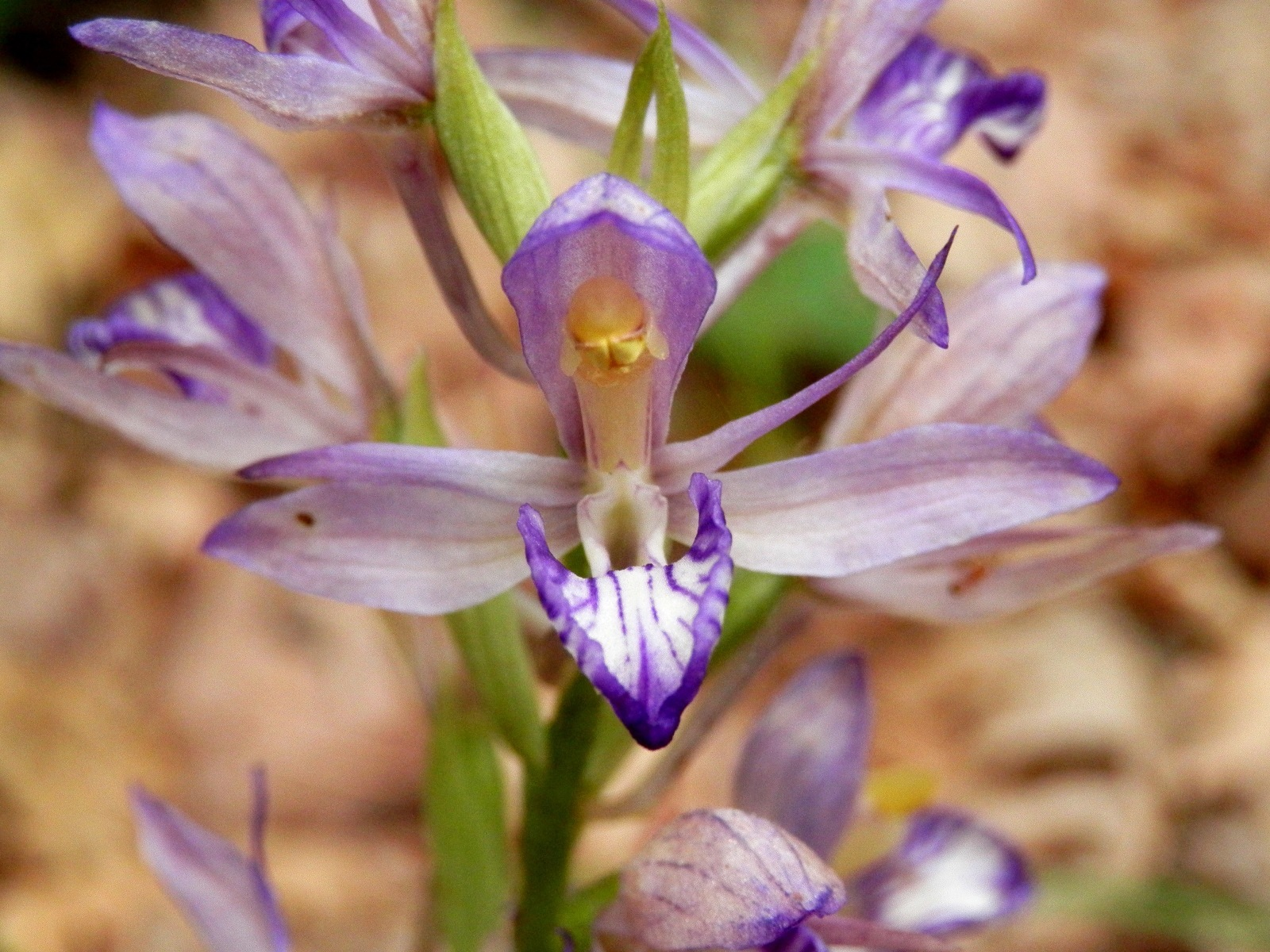

Scientific classification
- Kingdom: Plantae
- Clade: Tracheophytes
- Clade: Angiosperms
- Clade: Monocots
- Order: Asparagales
- Family: Orchidaceae
- Subfamily: Epidendroideae
- Genus: Limodorum
- Species: L. abortivum

Binomial name
- Limodorum abortivum (L.) Sw. (1799)

= Limodorum abortivum =

Species of orchid

Limodorum abortivum, also known as violet limodore or violet bird's-nest orchid, is a species of myco-heterotrophic, achlorophyllous orchid and is native to mainland Europe, western Asia and the Mediterranean area.

It is a rhizomatous herbaceous plant growing to 85 cm, with an inflorescence of 10-20 violet flowers produced from April to June. The leaves are reduced to scales and, although Limodorum contains photosynthetic pigments, these are insufficient to support the nutrition of the adult plant which is believed to rely entirely on a mycoheterotrophic or parasitic relationship with fungi, primarily of the family Russulaceae. Seeds are among the largest produced by orchids and seedlings develop very slowly, remaining entirely below ground for 8–10 years before flowering.

Typical Mediterranean habitat is open woodland of evergreen oak, pine and chestnut on alkaline soil from sea level to 1,300 metres.
