= Neottia smithiana =

Conservation status
- Endangered (IUCN 3.1)

Scientific classification
- Kingdom: Plantae
- Clade: Tracheophytes
- Clade: Angiosperms
- Clade: Monocots
- Order: Asparagales
- Family: Orchidaceae
- Subfamily: Epidendroideae
- Genus: Neottia
- Species: N. smithiana

Binomial name
- Neottia smithiana Schltr.

Synonyms
- Archineottia smithiana (Schltr.) S.C.Chen; Holopogon smithianus (Schltr.) S.C.Chen; Neottia kungii Tang & F.T.Wang

Species of orchid

Neottia smithiana is a species of flowering plant in the family Orchidaceae. It is endemic to China.
