= Thaia saprophytica =

Scientific classification
- Kingdom: Plantae
- Clade: Tracheophytes
- Clade: Angiosperms
- Clade: Monocots
- Order: Asparagales
- Family: Orchidaceae
- Subfamily: Epidendroideae
- Tribe: Thaieae; X.H.Jin & X.G.Xiang
- Genus: Thaia; Seidenf.
- Species: T. saprophytica

Binomial name
- Thaia saprophytica Seidenf.

Species of orchid

Thaia is a monotypic genus of flowering plants from the orchid family, Orchidaceae. The sole species is Thaia saprophytica, native to Laos and Thailand.

Thaia was previously tentatively placed in the tribe Neottieae, but is now placed as the only genus in the tribe Thaieae.

== See also ==
- List of Orchidaceae genera
