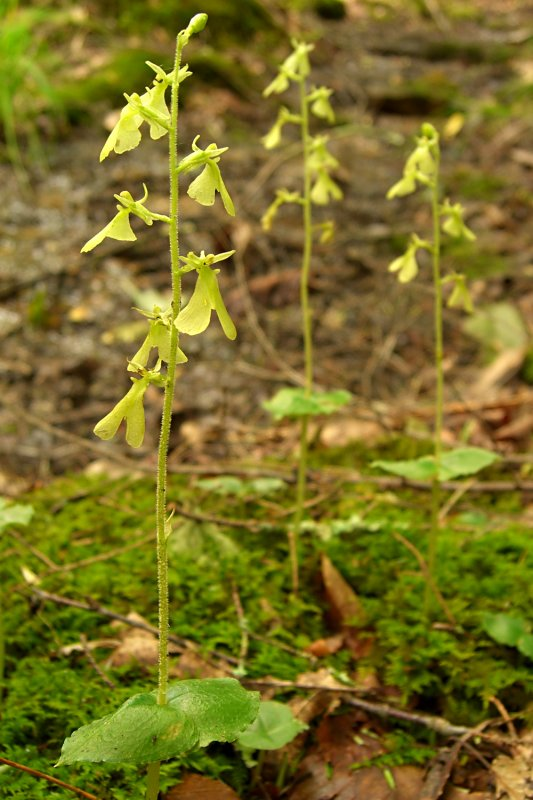
- Neottia smallii blooming

Scientific classification
- Kingdom: Plantae
- Clade: Tracheophytes
- Clade: Angiosperms
- Clade: Monocots
- Order: Asparagales
- Family: Orchidaceae
- Subfamily: Epidendroideae
- Genus: Neottia
- Species: N. smallii

Binomial name
- Neottia smallii (Wiegand) Szlach.

Synonyms
- Listera smallii Wiegand; Ophrys smallii (Wiegand) House; Bifolium smallii (Wiegand) Nieuwl.; Listera reniformis Small 1897, illegitimate homonym, not D. Don 1825; Listera smallii f. variegata P.M.Br.

= Neottia smallii =

Species of orchid

Neottia smallii (syn. Listera smallii), the kidneyleaf twayblade or Appalachian twayblade, is a species of terrestrial orchid found in the eastern United States. It occurs in the Appalachian Mountains from northern New Jersey to northeastern Georgia.
