= Neottia gaudissartii =

Conservation status
- Critically Endangered (IUCN 3.1)

Scientific classification
- Kingdom: Plantae
- Clade: Tracheophytes
- Clade: Angiosperms
- Clade: Monocots
- Order: Asparagales
- Family: Orchidaceae
- Subfamily: Epidendroideae
- Genus: Neottia
- Species: N. gaudissartii

Binomial name
- Neottia gaudissartii Hand.-Mazz.

Synonyms
- Archineottia gaudissartii (Hand.-Mazz.) S.C.Chen; Holopogon gaudissartii (Hand.-Mazz.) S.C.Chen; Diplandrorchis sinica S.C.Chen

Species of orchid

Neottia gaudissartii is a species of plant in the family Orchidaceae. It is endemic to China.
