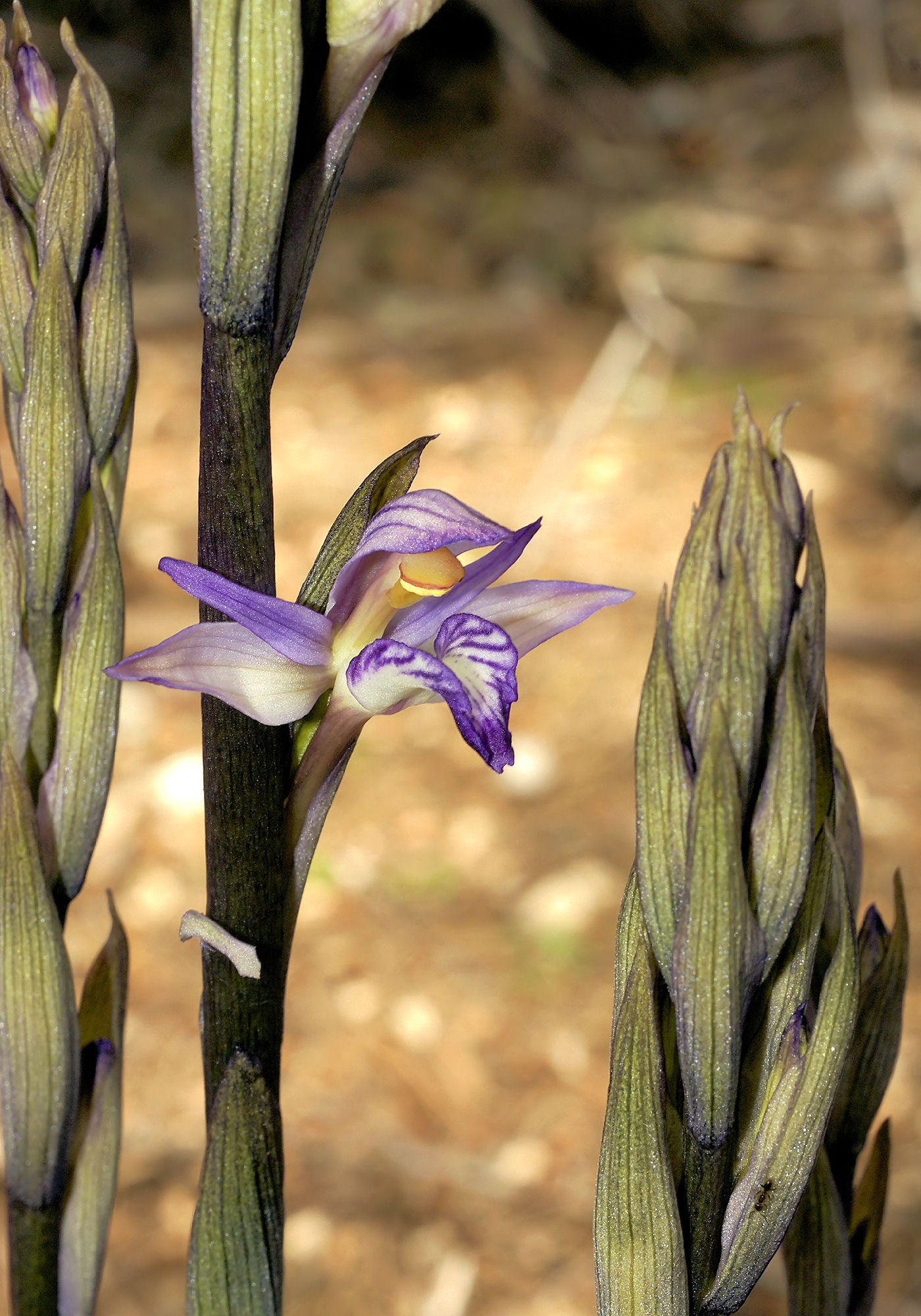
- Limodorum abortivum

Scientific classification
- Kingdom: Plantae
- Clade: Tracheophytes
- Clade: Angiosperms
- Clade: Monocots
- Order: Asparagales
- Family: Orchidaceae
- Subfamily: Epidendroideae
- Tribe: Neottieae
- Genus: Limodorum; Boehm. (1760)

Type species
- Limodorum abortivum

Synonyms
- Centrosis Sw., illegitimate name; Jonorchis Beck, illegitimate name; Limodoron St.-Lag.; Lequeetia Bubani

= Limodorum =

Genus of orchids

Limodorum is a genus of myco-heterotrophic orchids. All species are temperate terrestrial plants and occur across much of Europe, North-West Africa, the Mediterranean Islands, and as far east as Iran. Plants have evolved away from photosynthesis and as a result their leaves are reduced to scales. There is still chlorophyll present but the plants are believed to be solely dependent on their fungal partner for nutrients. They spend most of their life underground as a short stem with fleshy roots, the unbranched inflorescence can appear in April to June if conditions are favourable.

The name finds its origin in "haemodoron", first applied by Theophrastus and later adopted by Jacques Daléchamps to refer to parasitic plants most likely in Orobanche. The name is derived from the Greek “leimo-” (meadow) and “dōron,” (gift).

== Species ==
A very long list of names has been proposed over the years. Most of these species, once part of Limodorum, have been transferred to other genera. There are currently three recognised species in Limodorum:

- Limodorum abortivum (L.) Swartz - Central Europe, the Mediterranean region as far east as Iran and the Caucasus
- Limodorum trabutianum Bartolo & Pulv. - Turkey
- Limodorum rubriflorum Batt. - Spain, Portugal, Balearic Islands, Sardinia, Sicily, mainland Italy, Algeria, Morocco

== See also ==
- List of myco-heterotrophic genera
- List of Orchidaceae genera
