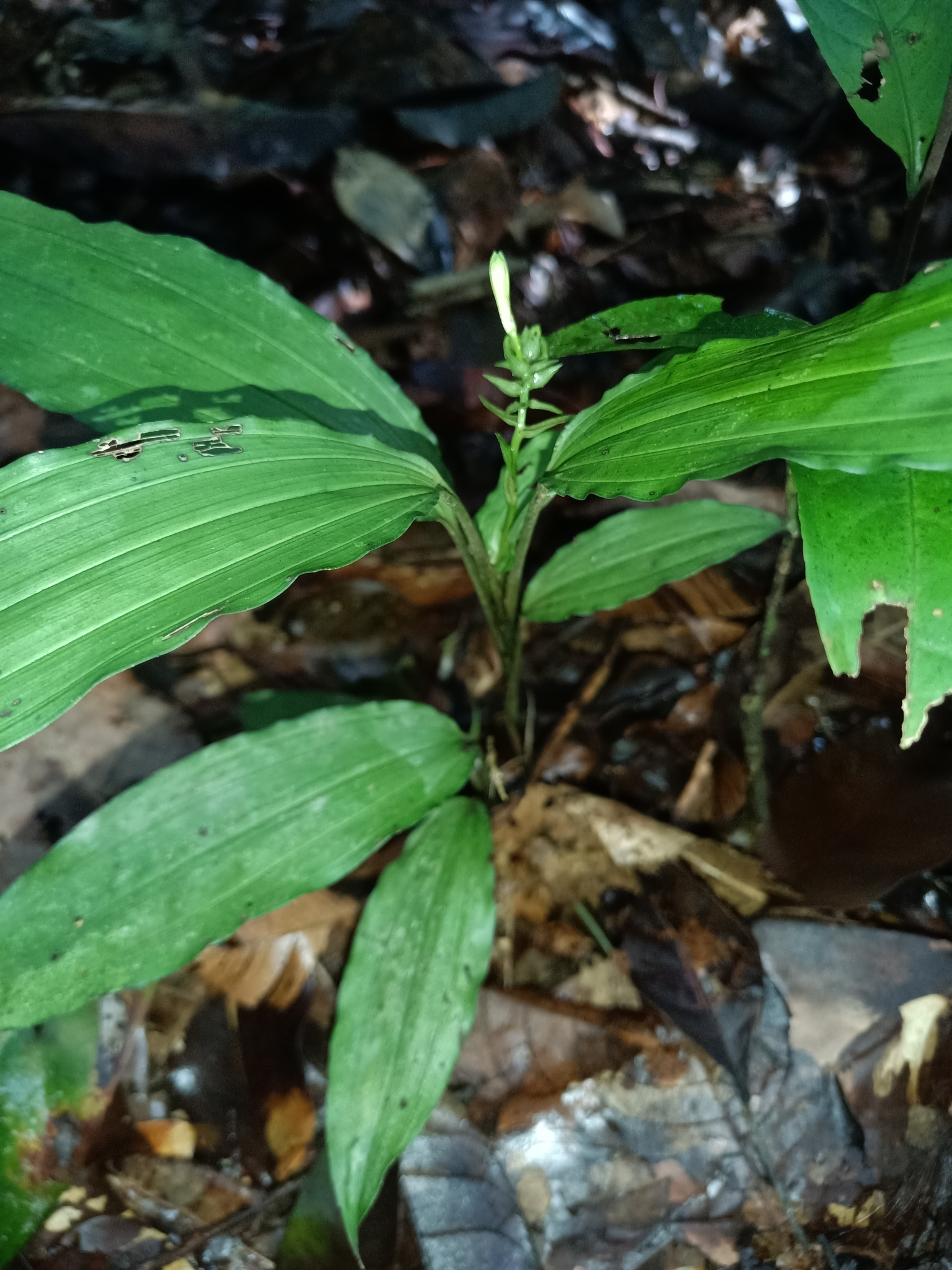
- Palmorchis pabstii

Scientific classification
- Kingdom: Plantae
- Clade: Tracheophytes
- Clade: Angiosperms
- Clade: Monocots
- Order: Asparagales
- Family: Orchidaceae
- Subfamily: Epidendroideae
- Tribe: Neottieae
- Genus: Palmorchis; Barb. Rodr.

Type species
- Palmorchis trinotata

Synonyms
- Jenmania Rolfe, illegitimate homonym; Rolfea Zahlbr.; Neobartlettia Schltr.

= Palmorchis =

Genus of orchids

Palmorchis is a genus of flowering plants from the orchid family, Orchidaceae. It is native to South America, Central America and Trinidad.

1. Palmorchis antioquiensis Szlach., Baranow & Dudek
2. Palmorchis blancae Damian
3. Palmorchis carlos-parrae Szlach. & Baranow
4. Palmorchis caxiuanensis Rocha, S.S.Almeida & Freitas - Pará
5. Palmorchis chocoensis Szlach., S.Nowak & Baranow
6. Palmorchis colombiana Garay - Colombia
7. Palmorchis deceptoria Veyret & Szlach. - Colombia
8. Palmorchis dressleriana Szlach., Baranow & Dudek
9. Palmorchis duckei Hoehne - Brazil
10. Palmorchis eidae Dressler - Costa Rica
11. Palmorchis fractiflexa Szlach. & Baranow
12. Palmorchis guianensis (Schltr.) C.Schweinf. & Correll - Brazil, Venezuela, the Guianas
13. Palmorchis imuyaensis Dodson & G.A.Romero - Ecuador
14. Palmorchis kuhlmannii (Schltr.) L.O.Williams
15. Palmorchis liberolabellata Damian
16. Palmorchis lobulata (Mansf.) C.Schweinf. & Correll - French Guiana, Ecuador, Peru
17. Palmorchis loretana Damian & L.A.Torres
18. Palmorchis maculata Szlach. & Baranow
19. Palmorchis maguirrei Szlach., S.Nowak & Baranow
20. Palmorchis misas-urretae Szlach. & Baranow
21. Palmorchis nitida Dressler - Costa Rica, Panama
22. Palmorchis pabstii Veyret - French Guiana
23. Palmorchis paludicola Dressler - Costa Rica
24. Palmorchis pandurata C.Schweinf. & Correll - Ecuador
25. Palmorchis powellii (Ames) C.Schweinf. & Correll - Costa Rica, Panama
26. Palmorchis prospectorum Veyret - French Guiana, Suriname
27. Palmorchis puber (Cogn.) Garay - Brazil, Venezuela
28. Palmorchis pubescentis Barb.Rodr. - French Guiana, Suriname, Brazil, Venezuela, Trinidad
29. Palmorchis rubioi Szlach., Baranow & Dudek
30. Palmorchis schneideri Szlach., Baranow & Dudek
31. Palmorchis silvicola L.O.Williams - Costa Rica, Ecuador
32. Palmorchis sobralioides Barb.Rodr. - Ecuador, Brazil
33. Palmorchis sordida Dressler - Costa Rica
34. Palmorchis trilobulata L.O.Williams - Nicaragua, Costa Rica, Panama, Suriname, Ecuador
35. Palmorchis trinotata Dressler - Panama
36. Palmorchis triquilhada Ferreira Filho & Barberena
37. Palmorchis valdiviesoana Szlach. & Baranow
38. Palmorchis yavarensis Damian & Torres

== See also ==
- List of Orchidaceae genera
