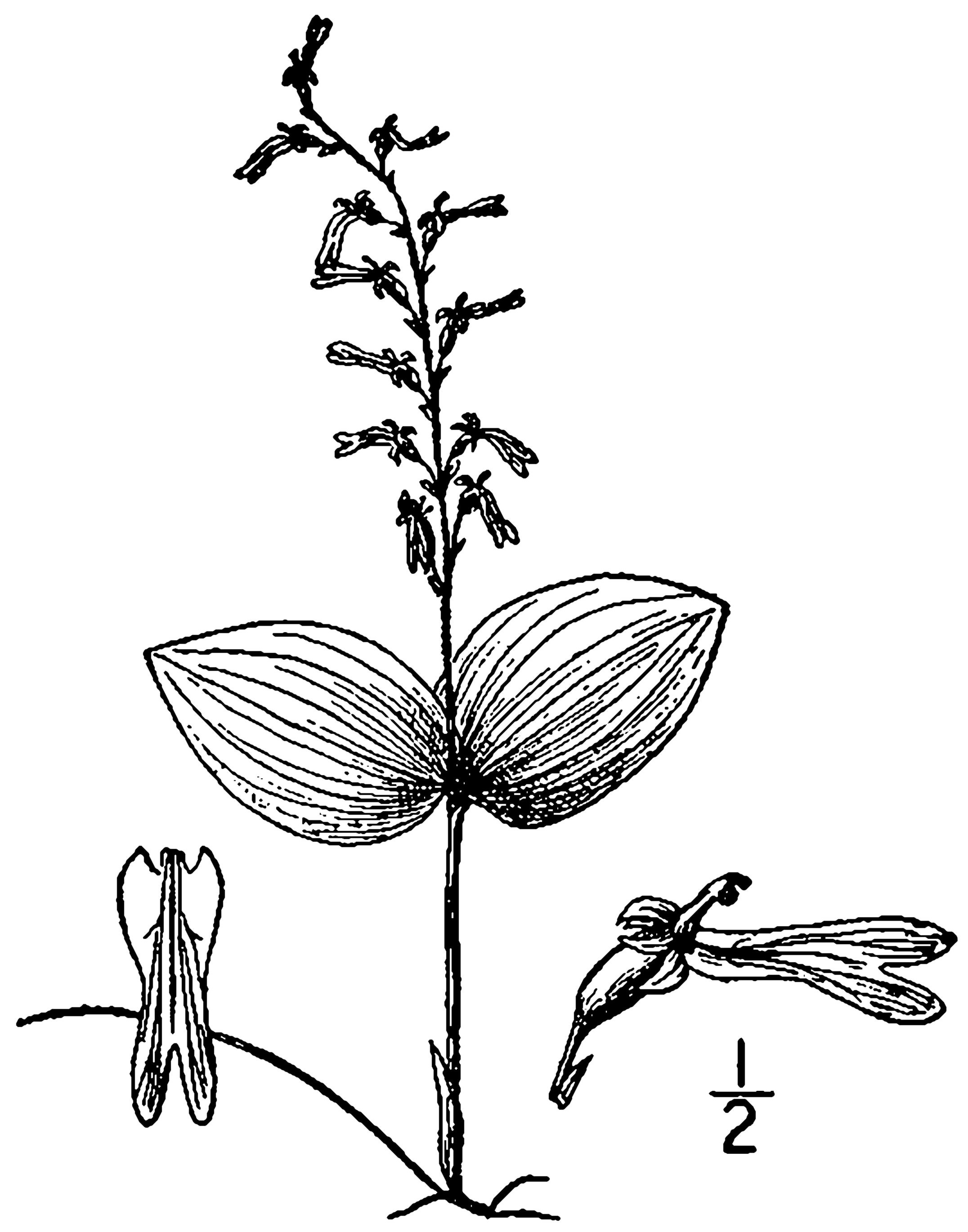

Scientific classification
- Kingdom: Plantae
- Clade: Tracheophytes
- Clade: Angiosperms
- Clade: Monocots
- Order: Asparagales
- Family: Orchidaceae
- Subfamily: Epidendroideae
- Tribe: Neottieae
- Genus: Neottia
- Species: N. auriculata

Binomial name
- Neottia auriculata (Wiegand) Szlach.

Synonyms
- Listera auriculata Wiegand; Ophrys auriculata (Wiegand) House; Bifolium auriculatum (Wiegand) Nieuwl.; Listera borealis f. trifolia Lepage; Listera auriculata f. trifolia (Lepage) Lepage

= Neottia auriculata =

Auricled twayblade

Species of orchid

Neottia auriculata (syn. Listera auriculata), the auricled twayblade, is a species of terrestrial orchid found in northeastern North America (Labrador, New Brunswick and Maine west to Manitoba and Minnesota.

== Description ==
N. auriculata when mature, has two ovate, sessile leaves that are paired on the stem but arranged oppositely. It has small pale-green flowers with three sepals and three petals, the lowest petal is modified into a wider lip - which is divided from one-fourth to one-third its length.

== Distribution and habitat ==
N. auriculata is a rare orchid species, which was in 1975 proposed as a threatened species in the US, but subsequent surveys found that it existed in greater abundance than initially thought. In the Great lakes region it occupies a very specific habitat, which has sandy soils just about the high water line of rivers that enter lake Superior. It is associated with alders or mossy-banks under trees.
