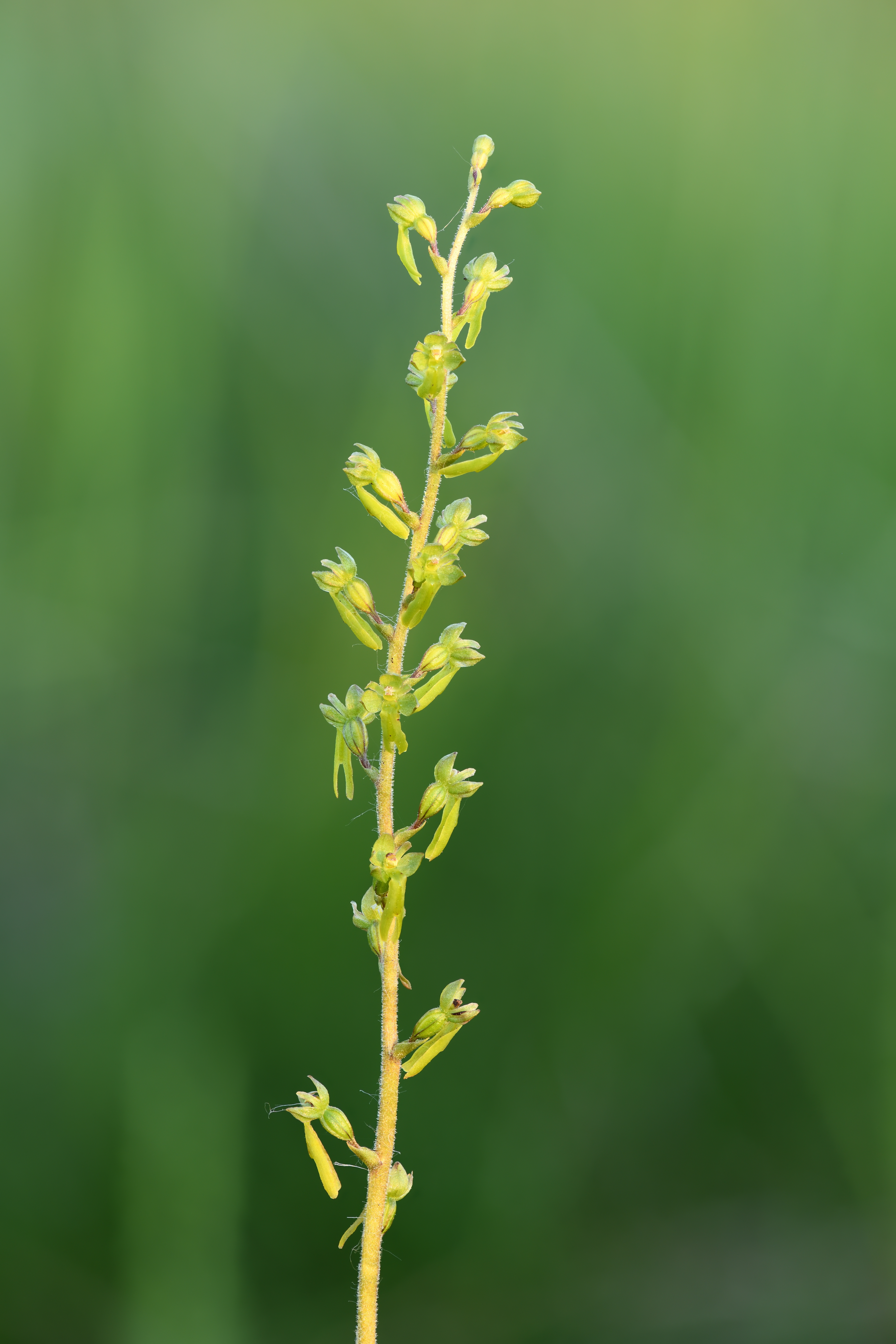

Conservation status
- Least Concern (IUCN 3.1) (Europe regional assessment)
- CITES Appendix II

Scientific classification
- Kingdom: Plantae
- Clade: Tracheophytes
- Clade: Angiosperms
- Clade: Monocots
- Order: Asparagales
- Family: Orchidaceae
- Subfamily: Epidendroideae
- Genus: Neottia
- Species: N. ovata

Binomial name
- Neottia ovata (L.) Bluff & Fingerh.

Synonyms
- Listera ovata (L.) R.Br.; Ophrys ovata L.; Epipactis ovata (L.) Crantz; Helleborine ovata (L.) F.W.Schmidt; Malaxis ovata (L.) Bernh.; Serapias ovata (L.) Steud.; Distomaea ovata (L.) Spenn.; Pollinirhiza ovata (L.) Dulac; Diphryllum ovatum (L.) Kuntze; Bifolium ovatum (L.) Nieuwl.; Ophrys bifolia Lam.; Epipactis ovalifolia Stokes; Neottia latifolia Rich; Listera multinervia Peterm.; also several names at the form and variety levels

= Neottia ovata =

Common twayblade

Species of orchid

Neottia ovata (formerly Listera ovata), the common twayblade or eggleaf twayblade, is a terrestrial orchid widespread across much of Europe and Asia.

== Description ==
The flowering stems are typically 20–60 cm (7.9–23.6 in) tall, occasionally up to 75 cm (30 in). There are two large opposite basal leaves, 5–20 cm (2.0–7.9 in) long. A variable number of flowers is borne on the stems, usually more than 15 but less than 100. The flowers are small and yellowish-green in colour. The sepals and the two side petals form a fairly open hood, 5–6 mm (0.2 in) long; the labellum or lip (the central petal) is 7–15 mm (0.3–0.6 in) long and is divided at the end into two lobes. Due to its slender profile, small flowers and green colour this species can be hard to spot.

== Distribution and habitat ==
Found across much of Europe including the British Isles, as well as Siberia, Central Asia, Southwest Asia and the Himalayas. It has been introduced into Ontario, Canada, where it has been called the eggleaf twayblade.

Neottia ovata grows in a variety of habitats: woods, meadows, dune-slacks and moorland.

== Ecology ==
The flower of Neottia ovata is well accessible for a wide range of insects. It is above all pollinated by parasitic wasps, sawflies and beetles. The pollinia lie free on top of the gutter-shaped rostellum, an organ that is filled with viscid fluid. When an insect touches the sensitive tip of the rostellum, the viscid fluid is ejected and glues the pollinia to the visitor's body. Fruit set is quite high.

Over 60 species of mycorrhizal fungi have been indicated to form associations with N. ovata. Neottia ovata is one of the most common European orchid species, and this is partially explained by it being less species-selective both in terms of pollinators and mycorrhizal partners. It is also an inconspicuous species, blending in to vegetation, which saves it from being picked by humans, a fate endangering many of the showier orchid species. Despite its relative success, there is evidence that populations are declining.

== Taxonomy ==
Neottia is Ancient Greek for bird's nest, and comes from the appearance of the roots in Neottia nidus-avis. The species epithet ovata comes from the Latin ovatus, meaning ovate or egg-shaped, and describing the leaves of the plant. Twayblade is an old English word meaning two-leaf. The common name in Germany (Zweiblatt) is very similar and has the same meaning.

Common twayblade was formerly placed in the genus Listera, but molecular phylogenetic studies have shown that Neottia nidus-avis, the bird's-nest orchid, evolved within the same group, and the two genera have been combined.

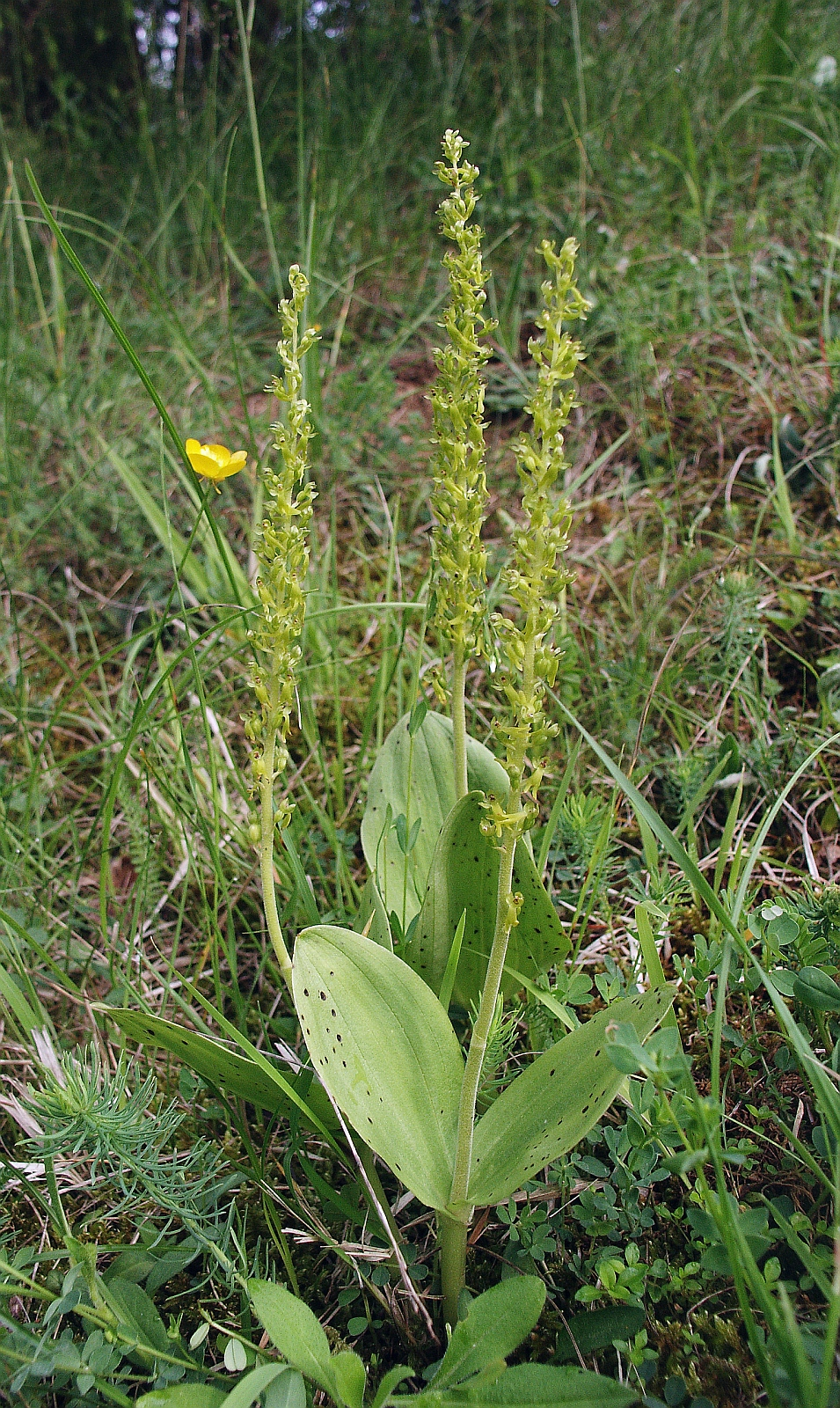
Flowering plants

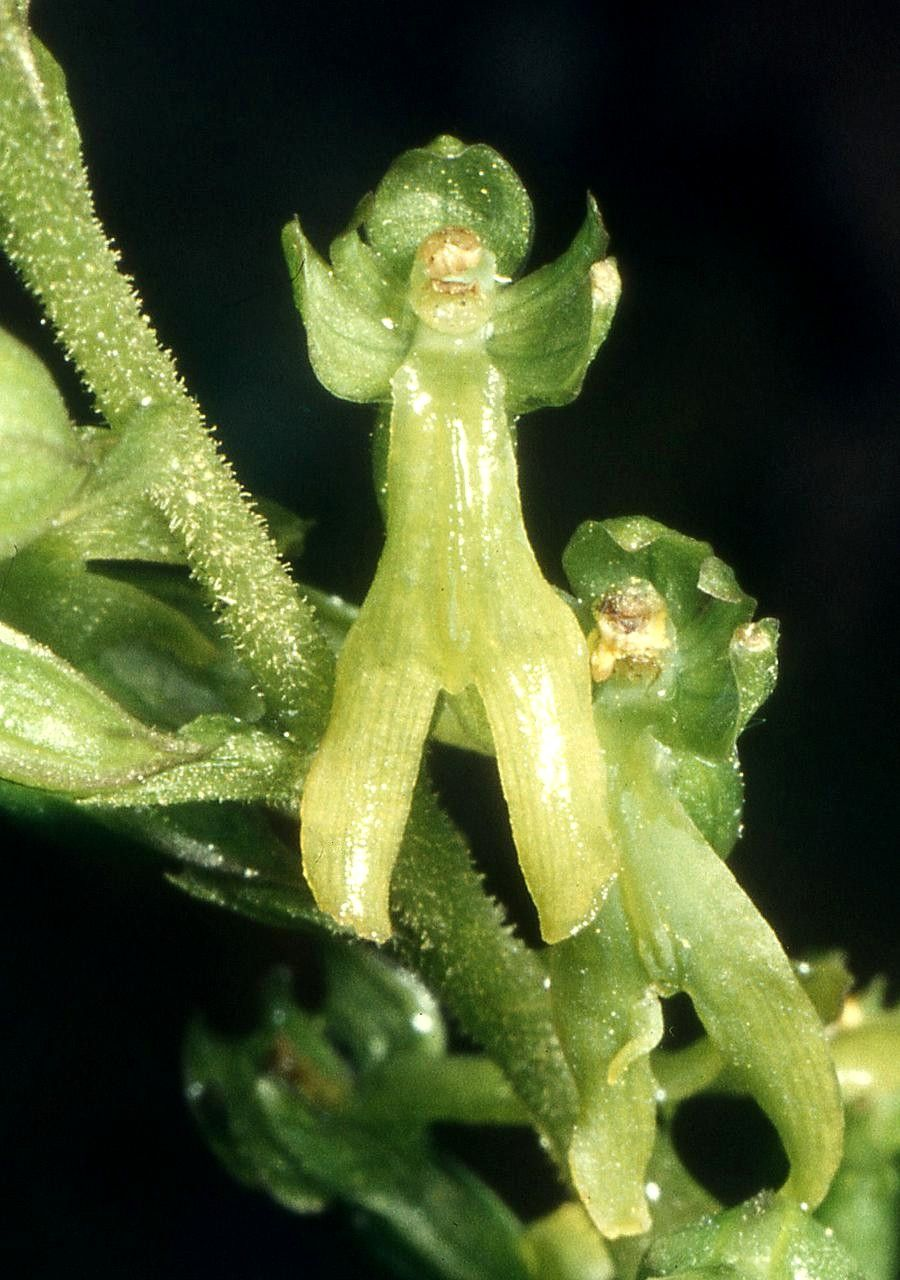
Individual flower
