= Neottia pekinensis =

Conservation status
- Endangered (IUCN 3.1)

Scientific classification
- Kingdom: Plantae
- Clade: Tracheophytes
- Clade: Angiosperms
- Clade: Monocots
- Order: Asparagales
- Family: Orchidaceae
- Subfamily: Epidendroideae
- Genus: Neottia
- Species: N. pekinensis

Binomial name
- Neottia pekinensis (X.Y.Mu & Bing Liu) R.Kr.Singh & Sanjeet Kumar

Synonyms
- Holopogon pekinensis X.Y.Mu & Bing Liu

Species of orchid

Neottia pekinensis, synonym Holopogon pekinensis, is a species of saprotrophic orchid. In 2017 it was found in Beijing. It grows under a wooded forest in a ravine at an altitude of 1000 m in a mountainous area.

== Discovery ==
Mu Xianyun (沐先运) at Beijing Forestry University discovered the rare orchid species in the Yanqing Mountains during a long-term follow-up survey of another rare orchid in Beijing, Cypripedium shanxiense. The new species was officially announced after minor structural analysis, literature inquiries, communication with Russian experts and confirmation by domestic orchid experts.

In 2020, researchers at Beijing Forestry University found it again during a survey of wild plants in the jungle at an altitude of 1,100 meters in the Wulingshan Nature Reserve in Miyun District.

== Description ==
The plant is 18 to 25 cm tall, and grows in clusters. The stem is upright, light green, with no green leaves; the flower is green, under a white membrane of 2 to 3 pieces, each length 2 to 4 cm, the top piece is sliver-shaped. The floral axis is 4 to 8 cm long, with 5 to 20 flowers, and has soft hair. The membranous tepals are shaped like a shawl pins, 6 to 8 mm long with a slightly hairy back. The flower is upright, radially symmetrical, green, when flowering the tepals are all expanded. The thin flower stalk is 4 to 8 mm long, with soft hair. The petals have a distinct middle vein, the lip petal is not divided, 3 to 4 mm long, 0.8 to 1 mm wide; the column is upright, 2 to 3 mm long, the anther is nearly egg-shaped, 0.4 to 0.5 mm long. The pollinium is oval. The ovary is also oval, about 5 mm long, and is hairy. Flowering is in August, fruiting period is in September.

The flower features are very primitive, the lip petals are not significantly differentiated, and the petals and sepals are similar. Morphologically, a related species is Neottia acuminata (syn. Holopogon ussuriensis).

== Taxonomy ==
The species was first described as Holopogon pekinensis in 2017. The status of the genus Holopogon has been disputed. It is closely related to the genus Neottia, which some sources treat as synonyms, but studies have also suggested that it may be close to the Cephalanthera and should be independent (Chen et al., 2016). In 2024, the species was transferred to Neottia as Neottia pekinensis.
