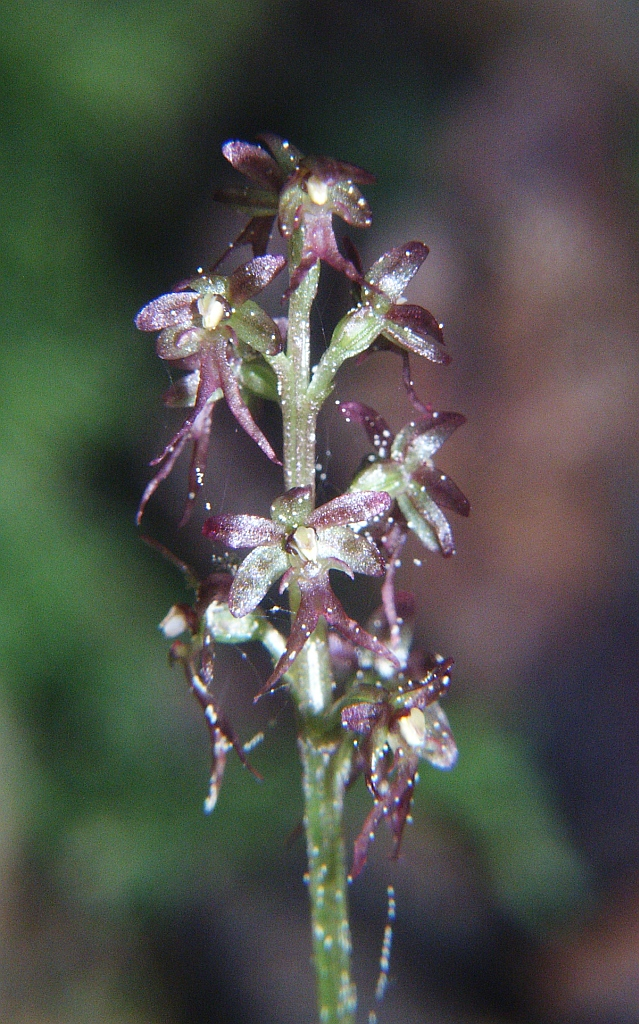
- Neottia cordata (syn. Listera cordata)

Scientific classification
- Kingdom: Plantae
- Clade: Tracheophytes
- Clade: Angiosperms
- Clade: Monocots
- Order: Asparagales
- Family: Orchidaceae
- Subfamily: Epidendroideae
- Tribe: Neottieae
- Genus: Neottia; Guett.

Type species
- Neottia nidus-avis

Synonyms
- Listera R.Br.; Nidus Riv.; Nidus-avis Ortega.; Cardiophyllum Ehrh.; Diphryllum Raf.; Neottidium Schltdl.; Distomaea Spenn.; Pollinirhiza Dulac; Holopogon Kom. & Nevski in V.L.Komarov; Archineottia S.C.Chen; Diplandrorchis S.C.Chen

= Neottia =

Genus of orchids

Neottia is a genus of orchids. The genus now includes the former genus Listera, commonly known as twayblades, referring to the single pair of opposite leaves at the base of the flowering stem. The genus is native to temperate, subarctic and arctic regions across most of Europe, northern Asia (Siberia, China, the Himalayas, Central Asia, etc), and North America, with a few species extending into subtropical regions in the Mediterranean, Indochina, the southeastern United States, etc.

Neottia produces a racemose inflorescences with flowers in shades of green or dull pink through to maroon and purple. The lip of each flower is prominently forked or two-lobed. Some species (those which were previously the only members of the genus Neottia in the strict sense, such as the bird's-nest orchid, Neottia nidus-avis) are completely without chlorophyll and have leaves which are reduced to scales.

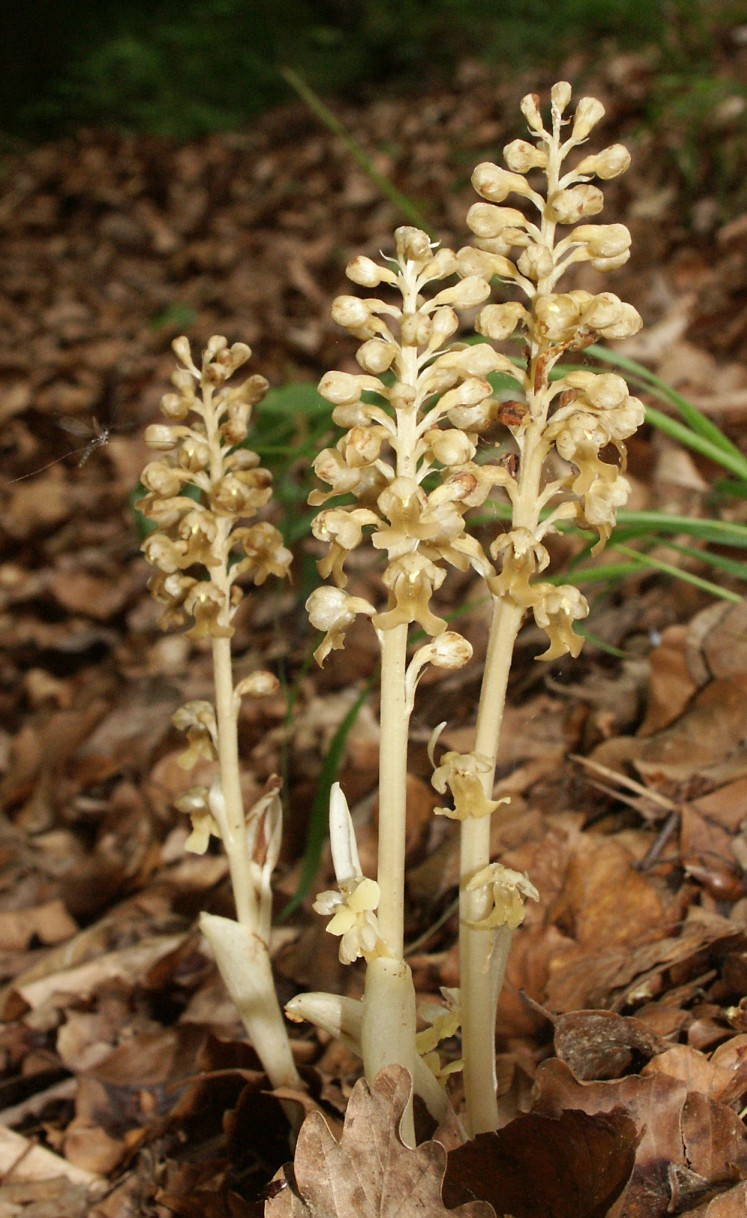
N. nidus-avis, a non-photosynthetic species

== Description ==
Neottia is a genus of relatively small terrestrial orchids. Some (the former genus Listera) have chlorophyll and are hence gaining their energy from photosynthesis. Others (the formerly narrowly defined genus Neottia) lack chlorophyll and are dependent on fungi for their nutrition (mycotrophic). The flowering stem has a number of greenish or brownish bracts at the base. In the photosynthetic members of the genus there are also two more-or-less opposite green leaves (very rarely more than two in Neottia ovata). The flowers are individually small, in shades of green, yellow, brown or red to purple. The lip is usually much larger than the other five tepals, and is almost always deeply divided into two lobes at the end. The other five tepals may form a loose hood. The pollinia are not stalked.

== Taxonomy ==
At one time the genus was divided between Neottia and Listera. Molecular phylogenetic studies in this century have shown that species lacking chlorophyll, such as Neottia nidus-avis, evolved within a larger clade of photosynthetic plants containing Neottia and Listera, so that the two genera should be combined. As Neottia is the older name, sources such as the World Checklist of Selected Plant Families and the Flora of China now use Neottia for all species formerly in Listera. Other sources continued to divide the genus into two.

=== Species ===
As of May 2026, Plants of the World Online accepted the following species:

- Neottia acuminata Schltr.
- Neottia alternifolia (King & Pantl.) Szlach.
- Neottia anthropophora (Aver. & V.C.Nguyen) R.Kr.Singh & Sanjeet Kumar
- Neottia atayalica T.C.Hsu
- Neottia auriculata (Wiegand) Szlach.
- Neottia bambusetorum (Hand.-Mazz.) Szlach.
- Neottia banksiana (Lindl.) Rchb.f.
- Neottia bicallosa X.H.Jin
- Neottia biflora (Schltr.) Szlach.
- Neottia bifolia (Raf.) Baumbach
- Neottia borealis (Morong) Szlach.
- Neottia brevicaulis (King & Pantl.) Szlach.
- Neottia brevilabris Tang & F.T.Wang
- Neottia breviscapa T.C.Hsu
- Neottia camtschatea (L.) Spreng.
- Neottia chandrae Raskoti, J.J.Wood & Ale
- Neottia chawalongensis J.D.Ya & D.Z.Li
- Neottia chenii S.W.Gale & P.J.Cribb
- Neottia cinsbuensis T.P.Lin & D.M.Huang
- Neottia confusa Bhaumik
- Neottia convallarioides (Sw.) Rich.
- Neottia cordata (L.) Rich.
- Neottia deltoidea (Fukuy.) Szlach.
- Neottia dentata (King & Pantl.) Szlach.
- Neottia dihangensis Bhaumik
- Neottia divaricata (Panigrahi & P.Taylor) Szlach.
- Neottia fangii (Tang & F.T.Wang ex S.C.Chen & G.H.Zhu) S.C.Chen, S.W.Gale & P.J.Cribb
- Neottia flabellata (W.W.Sm.) Szlach.
- Neottia fugongensis (X.H.Jin) J.M.H.Shaw
- Neottia fukuyamae T.C.Hsu & S.W.Chung
- Neottia furusei T.Yukawa & Yagame
- Neottia gaudissartii Hand.-Mazz.
- Neottia hohuanshanensis T.P.Lin & Shu H.Wu
- Neottia inagakii Yagame, Katsuy. & T.Yukawa
- Neottia inayatii (Duthie) Schltr.
- Neottia japonica (Blume) Szlach.
- Neottia karoana Szlach.
- Neottia kiusiana T.Hashim. & S.Hatus.
- Neottia kuanshanensis H.J.Su
- Neottia latilabra (Evrard ex Gagnep.) M.H.J.van der Meer
- Neottia lihengiae J.D.Ya, H.Jiang & D.Z.Li
- Neottia linzhiensis X.H.Jin
- Neottia listeroides Lindl.
- Neottia longicaulis (King & Pantl.) Szlach.
- Neottia mackinnonii Deva & H.B.Naithani
- Neottia makinoana (Ohwi) Szlach.
- Neottia maolanensis M.N.Wang
- Neottia megalochila S.C.Chen
- Neottia meifongensis (H.J.Su & C.Y.Hu) T.C.Hsu & S.W.Chung
- Neottia microauriculata T.C.Hsu
- Neottia microglottis (Duthie) Schltr.
- Neottia microphylla (S.C.Chen & Y.B.Luo) S.C.Chen, S.W.Gale & P.J.Cribb
- Neottia milinensis J.J.Lei & X.H.Jin
- Neottia morrisonicola (Hayata) Szlach.
- Neottia motuoensis X.H.Jin
- Neottia mucronata (Panigrahi & J.J.Wood) Szlach.
- Neottia nanchuanica (S.C.Chen) Szlach.
- Neottia nandadeviensis (Hajra) Szlach.
- Neottia nankomontana (Fukuy.) Szlach.
- Neottia nepalensis (N.P.Balakr.) Szlach.
- Neottia nidus-avis (L.) Rich.
- Neottia nipponica (Makino) Szlach.
- Neottia nujiangensis X.H.Jin
- Neottia nyinyikyawii X.H.Jin, A.T.Mu & H.A.Mung
- Neottia oblata (S.C.Chen) Szlach.
- Neottia ovata (L.) Hartm.
- Neottia pantlingii (W.W.Sm.) Tang & F.T.Wang
- Neottia papilligera Schltr.
- Neottia pekinensis (X.Y.Mu & Bing Liu) R.Kr.Singh & Sanjeet Kumar
- Neottia piluchiensis T.P.Lin
- Neottia pinetorum (Lindl.) Szlach.
- Neottia pseudonipponica (Fukuy.) Szlach.
- Neottia puberula (Maxim.) Szlach.
- Neottia ruisuiensis T.P.Lin
- Neottia shenlengiana T.C.Hsu
- Neottia smallii (Wiegand) Szlach.
- Neottia smithiana Schltr.
- Neottia smithii (Schltr.) Szlach.
- Neottia taibaishanensis P.H.Yang & K.Y.Lang
- Neottia taizanensis (Fukuy.) Szlach.
- Neottia tatakaensis T.C.Hsu & H.C.Hung
- Neottia tenii Schltr.
- Neottia tenuis (Lindl.) Szlach.
- Neottia unguiculata (W.W.Sm.) Szlach.
- Neottia × veltmanii (Case) Baumbach
- Neottia wardii (Rolfe) Szlach.
- Neottia wuyishanensis B.Hua Chen & X.H.Jin
- Neottia yunnanensis (S.C.Chen) Szlach.
