= Neottia dihangensis =

Conservation status
- Critically Endangered (IUCN 3.1)

Scientific classification
- Kingdom: Plantae
- Clade: Tracheophytes
- Clade: Angiosperms
- Clade: Monocots
- Order: Asparagales
- Family: Orchidaceae
- Subfamily: Epidendroideae
- Genus: Neottia
- Species: N. dihangensis

Binomial name
- Neottia dihangensis M. Bhaumik

Species of orchid

Neottia dihangensis is a critically endangered species of orchid endemic to Arunachal Pradesh in northeastern India. It was found in a group of 6 to 10 in the Dihang-Dibang Biosphere Reserve.

== Description ==
Neottia dihangensis is a terrestrial autotrophic orchid found on the forest floor. It reaches a height of 30–40 centimetres (12–16 in), making it higher than other Neottia species. The stem is yellowish green, terete, and ridged, while the leaves are sessile (attached without stalks). The leaves are oval shaped, being 1.8–2 centimetres (0.71–0.79 in) long and 1–1.3 centimetres (0.39–0.51 in) wide and rounded at the apex.

They have 12 to 27 flowers along their ridged stems. These flowers are greenish and 3–5 millimetres (0.12–0.20 in) long. They are attached to hairy stalks, and are known to be present in July. Its lip is 8–9 by 3–6 millimetres (0.31 in–0.35 in × 0.12 in–0.24 in).

N. dihangensis belongs to the Neottia genus, which contains both autotrophic and myco-heterotrophic plants: N. dihangensis is autotrophic. Neottia has been combined with Listera, which used to be a separate genus.

== Distribution ==
Neottia dihangensis was found growing on a mossy forest floor dominated by Rhododendron shrubs and fir trees within the Dihang-Dibang Biosphere Reserve in the Upper Siang district of Arunachal Pradesh, which is in the temperate biome and has an elevation of 3,200–3,800 metres (10,500–12,500 ft). A cluster of 6 to 10 was found in 2010 in July, with IUCN listing 10. The name comes from the Dihang-Dibang reserve, where it was found by Manas Bhaumik, a researcher for the Botanical Survey of India.

It was discovered inside a protected area, and was originally classified as least concern, because it is far from human habitation and there are no immediate threats. It has now been listed as critically endangered under criteria D of the IUCN.
