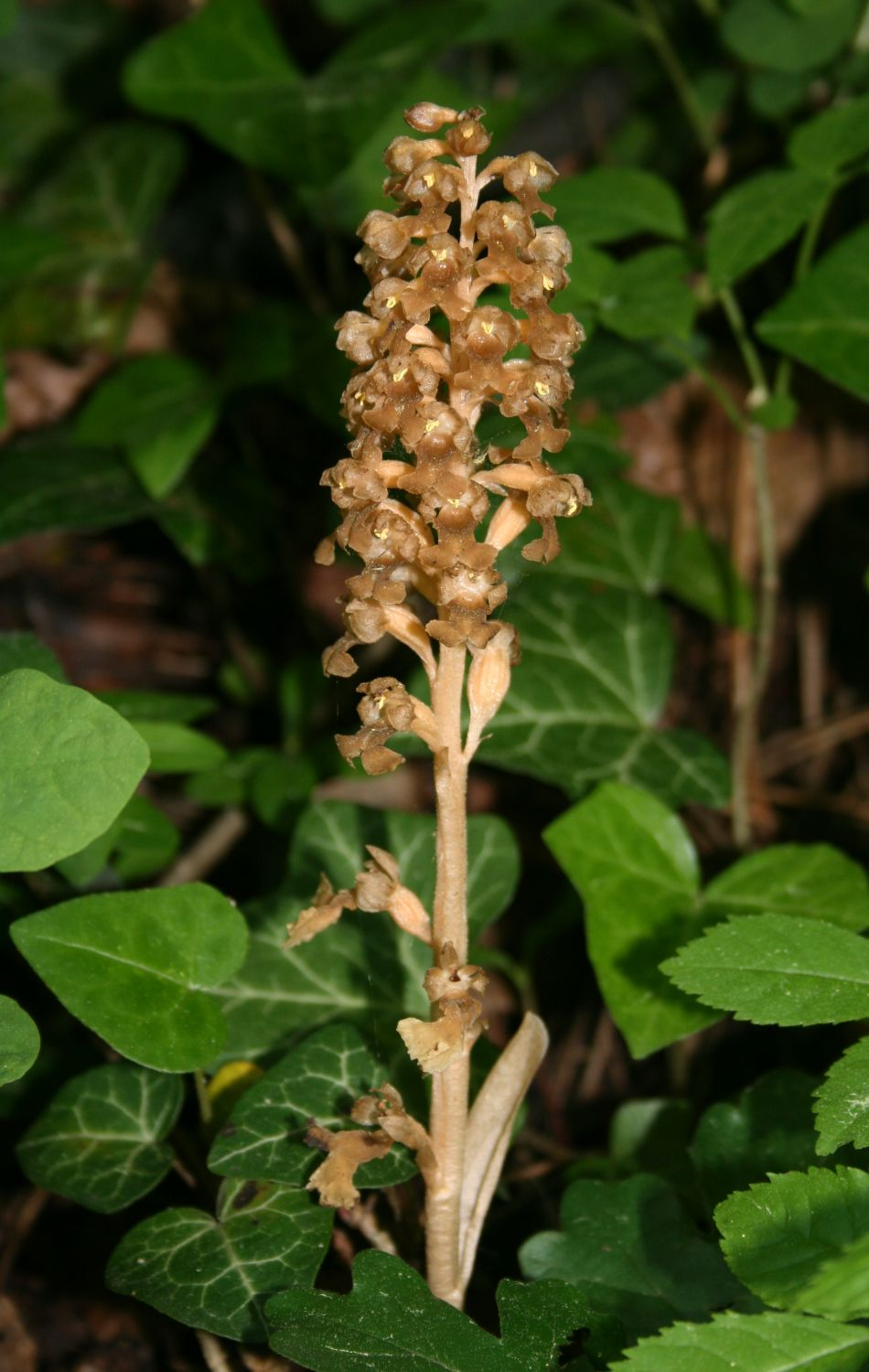
- Neottia nidus-avis

Scientific classification
- Kingdom: Plantae
- Clade: Tracheophytes
- Clade: Angiosperms
- Clade: Monocots
- Order: Asparagales
- Family: Orchidaceae
- Subfamily: Epidendroideae
- Tribe: Neottieae; Lindl. (1826) Orchid. Select. 7, 9 (1826)

Genera
- Aphyllorchis; Cephalanthera; Epipactis; Limodorum; Neottia; Palmorchis

Synonyms
- Listerinae Lindl. ex Meisn. (1842) Pl. Vasc. Gen., tab diagm., 385 (1842); Limordorinae Benth., (1881) J. Linn. Soc. Bot., 18, 288 (1881); Palmorchideae Dressler, (1979) Selbyana, 5, 205 (1979)

= Neottieae =

Tribe of orchids

Neottieae is an orchid tribe in the subfamily Epidendroideae. It contains six genera and over 200 species distributed mainly in temperate and subtropical zones of the northern hemisphere. All its members are terrestrial plants, hinting at an early branching with Epidendroideae which is largely an epiphytic group. Neottieae is likely to be the result of a single temperate radiation of epidendroids, although it appears that some lineages in this tribe have crept back into the tropics.

The genus Thaia had been tentatively included in this tribe, but is now placed in the tribe Thaieae. Palmorchis is sister to the other genera and was moved here from Palmorchideae based on molecular evidence. It is the only group in this tribe that occurs in Central and South America and is morphologically isolated.

== Etymology ==
The name of this tribe was taken from one of its genera: Neottia Guett. (1754). This name refers to the particular shape of the tangled mass of roots of plants in this genus, forming what looks like a bird's “nest”. In Greek "neottia" means "nest". The name Neottia was introduced in the botanical nomenclature by the French naturalist and geologist Jean-Étienne Guettard (1715 - 1786) in 1754; while the name for the tribe was proposed by the English botanist John Lindley (1799 - 1865) in the publication "Orchidearum Sceletos" of 1826.

== Description ==
Plants of this tribe are terrestrial orchids with approximately 85 temperate species. In addition, some of these plants are mycoheterotrophic, i.e. no longer reliant on chlorophyll (genus Neottia and Limodorum). Mycoheterotrophy is common and has independently evolved at least three times in this group.

The height varies from a few centimeters up to about 100 cm (genus Epipactis). The prevalent biological form of the tribe is rhizome geophyte, they are herbaceous perennials with underground buds. The temperate species remain dormant underground when conditions are too cold.

== See also ==
- Taxonomy of the Orchidaceae
