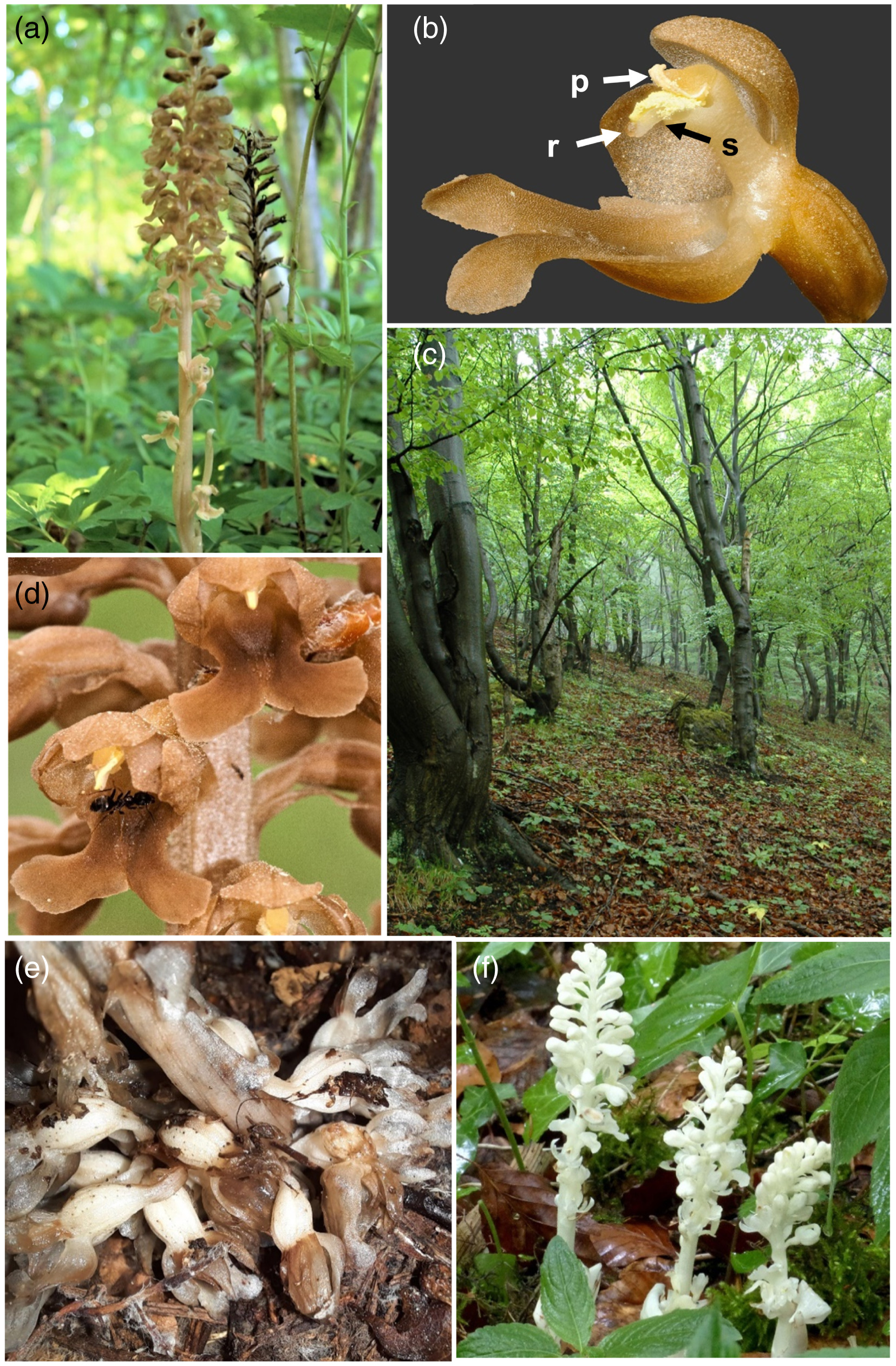

Scientific classification
- Kingdom: Plantae
- Clade: Tracheophytes
- Clade: Angiosperms
- Clade: Monocots
- Order: Asparagales
- Family: Orchidaceae
- Subfamily: Epidendroideae
- Genus: Neottia
- Species: N. nidus-avis

Binomial name
- Neottia nidus-avis (L.) Rich.
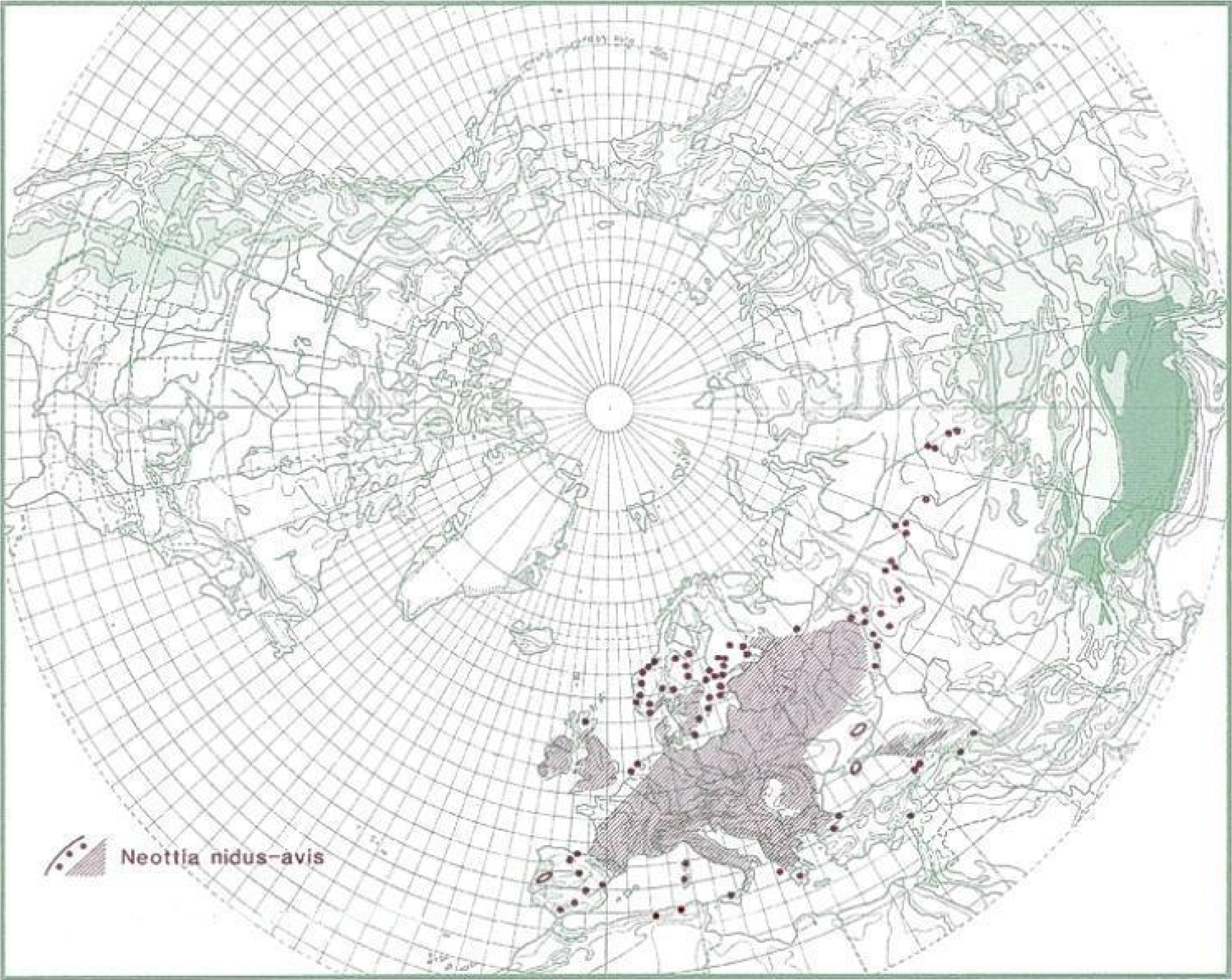

Synonyms
- Ophrys nidus-avis L.; Epipactis nidus-avis (L.) Crantz; Listera nidus-avis (L.) Curtis; Helleborine nidus-avis (L.) F.W.Schmidt; Malaxis nidus-avis (L.) Bernh.; Serapias nidus-avis (L.) Steud.; Neottidium nidus-avis (L.) Schltdl.; Distomaea nidus-avis (L.) Spenn.; Helleborine succulenta F.W.Schmidt; Neottia macrostelis Peterm.; Neottia squamosa Dulac; Neottia orobanchoidea St.-Lag.; Neottia nidus-avis f. glandulosa Beck; Neottia nidus-avis f. dilatata Zapal.; Neottia nidus-avis f. micrantha Zapal.

= Neottia nidus-avis =

Species of orchid

Neottia nidus-avis, the bird's-nest orchid, is a non-photosynthetic orchid, native to Europe, Russia, with sporadic presence in North-Africa, and some parts of the Middle East.

== Description ==
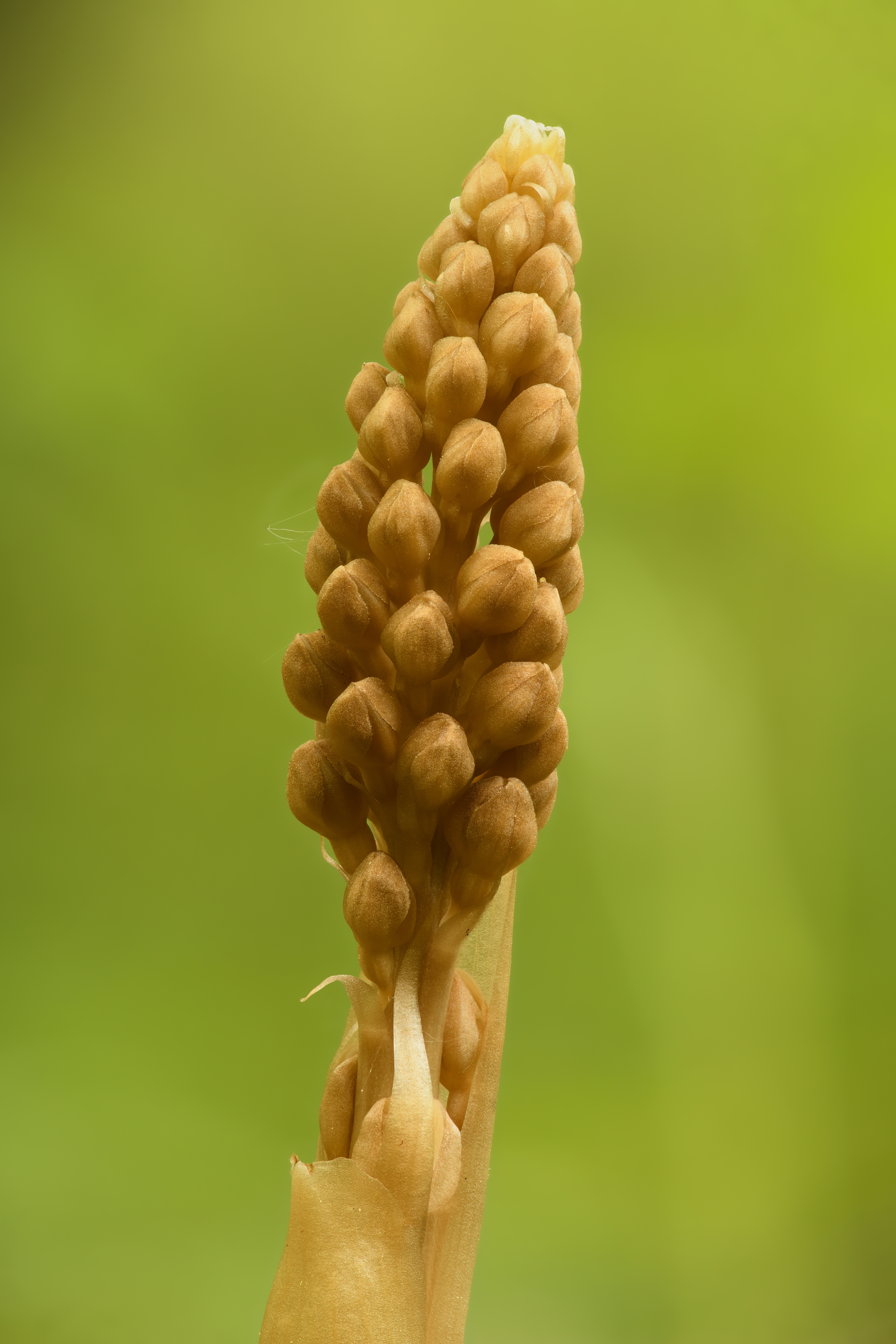
Flower buds

Neottia nidus-avis grows to 40 cm (16 in) tall and each shoot can carry up to 60 flowers. Plants are not in any part green, deriving all their nutrition from a mycorrhizal fungus in the soil/litter, which in turn derives nutrition from the roots of trees. Plants are generally beige-brown, though sometimes yellowish or white forms are discovered. The flower labellum splits and strongly diverges at its lower end. This species of orchid can be hard to spot, being camouflaged against the leaf litter.

Across Europe, this species flowers May–June.

== Distribution and habitat ==
It is widespread across most of Europe, occurring also in Algeria, Tunisia, western Siberia, the Caucasus, Iran and Turkey.

In the British Isles, Neottia nidus-avis is found in shady woodland, especially beech, on basic soils. Its conservation status in the UK is near-threatened.

== Ecology ==
Neottia nidus-avis has been found to flourish only in partnership with mycorrhizal fungi in the genus Sebacina, particularly Sebacina dimitica in the UK.

Pollination is carried out by Diptera and possibly also ants. Self-pollination may occur if insects do not pollinate the plants.

== Taxonomy ==
The Latin binomial Neottia nidus-avis, as well as the common names of this orchid in several languages, derive from a comparison of the tangled roots of the plant to a bird's nest.

Twayblade orchids were recently reassigned to the genus Neottia after scientists found that they were closely related to N. nidus-avis.

== Gallery ==
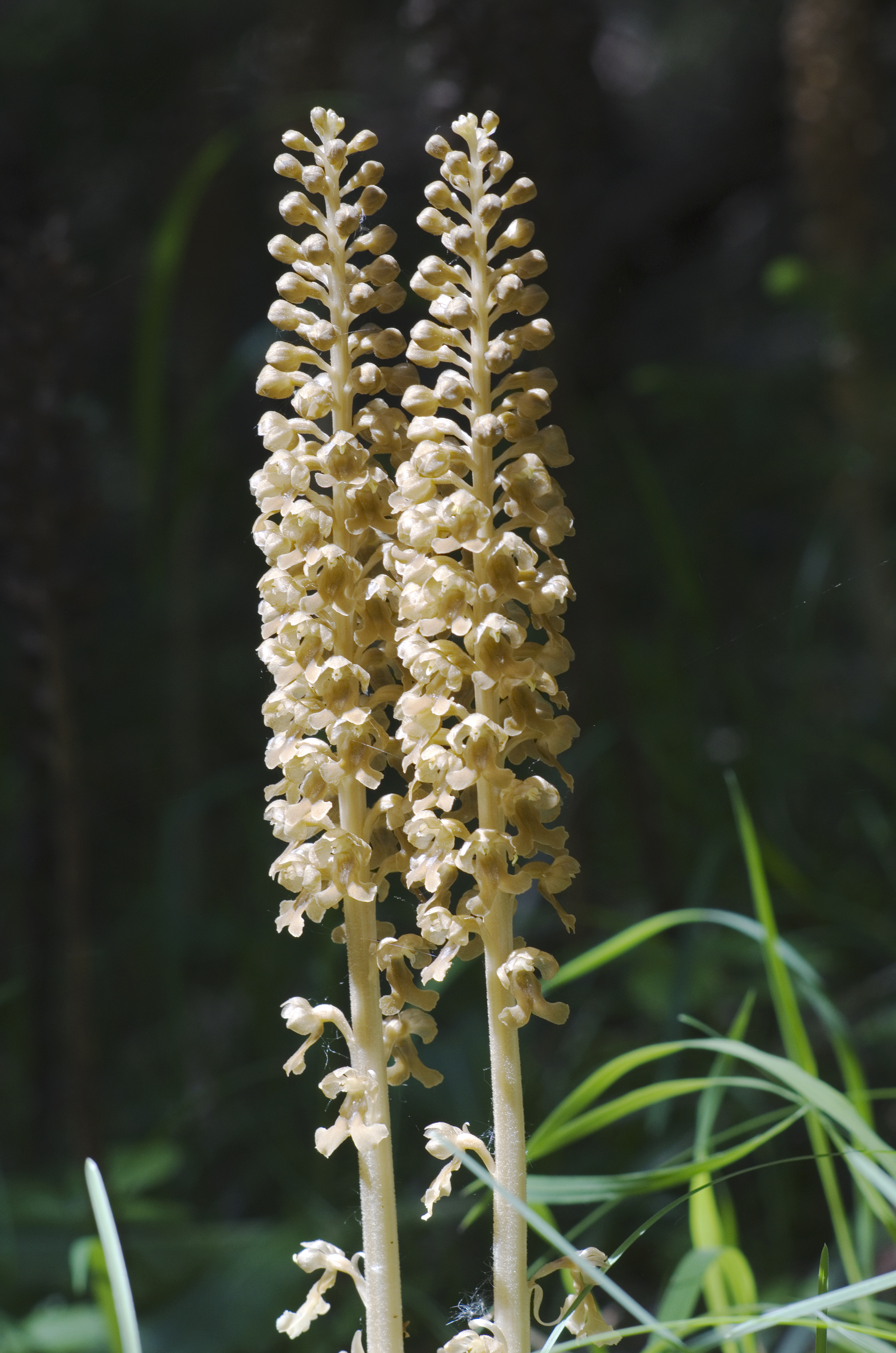
Maturing flowers, Strážov Mountains.

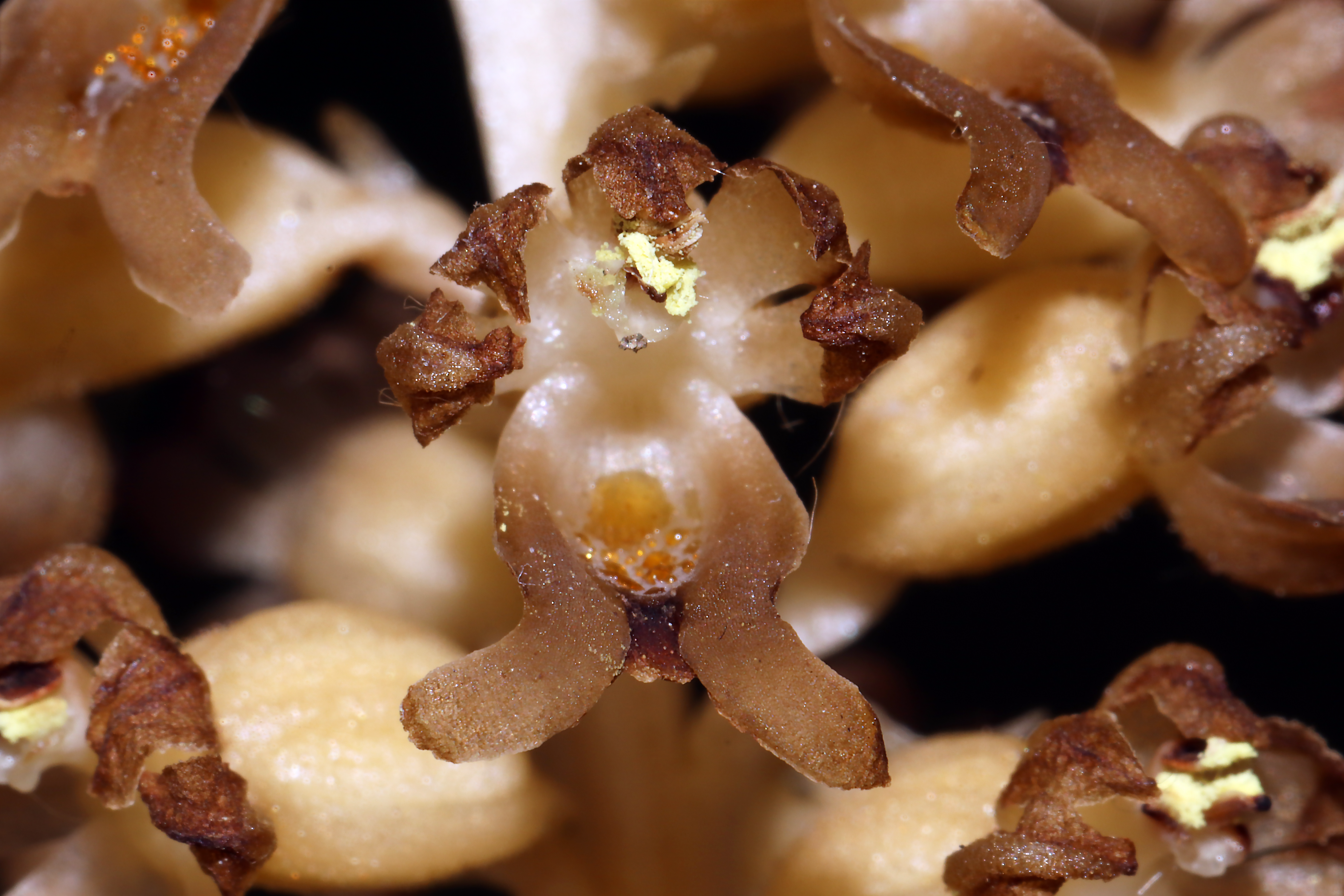
Closeup of flowers, Sassello.

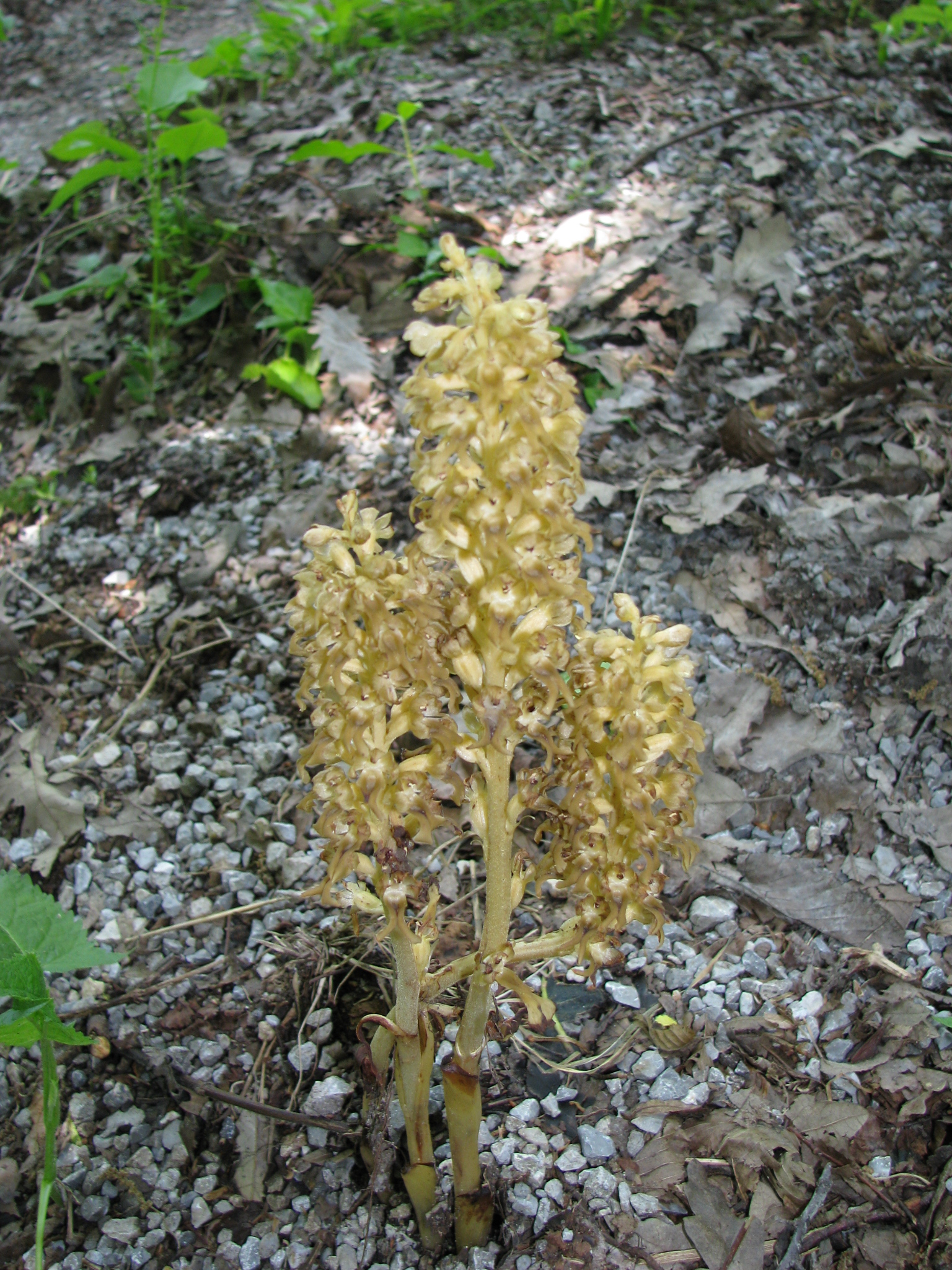
Late flowering, Stari trg ob Kolpi.

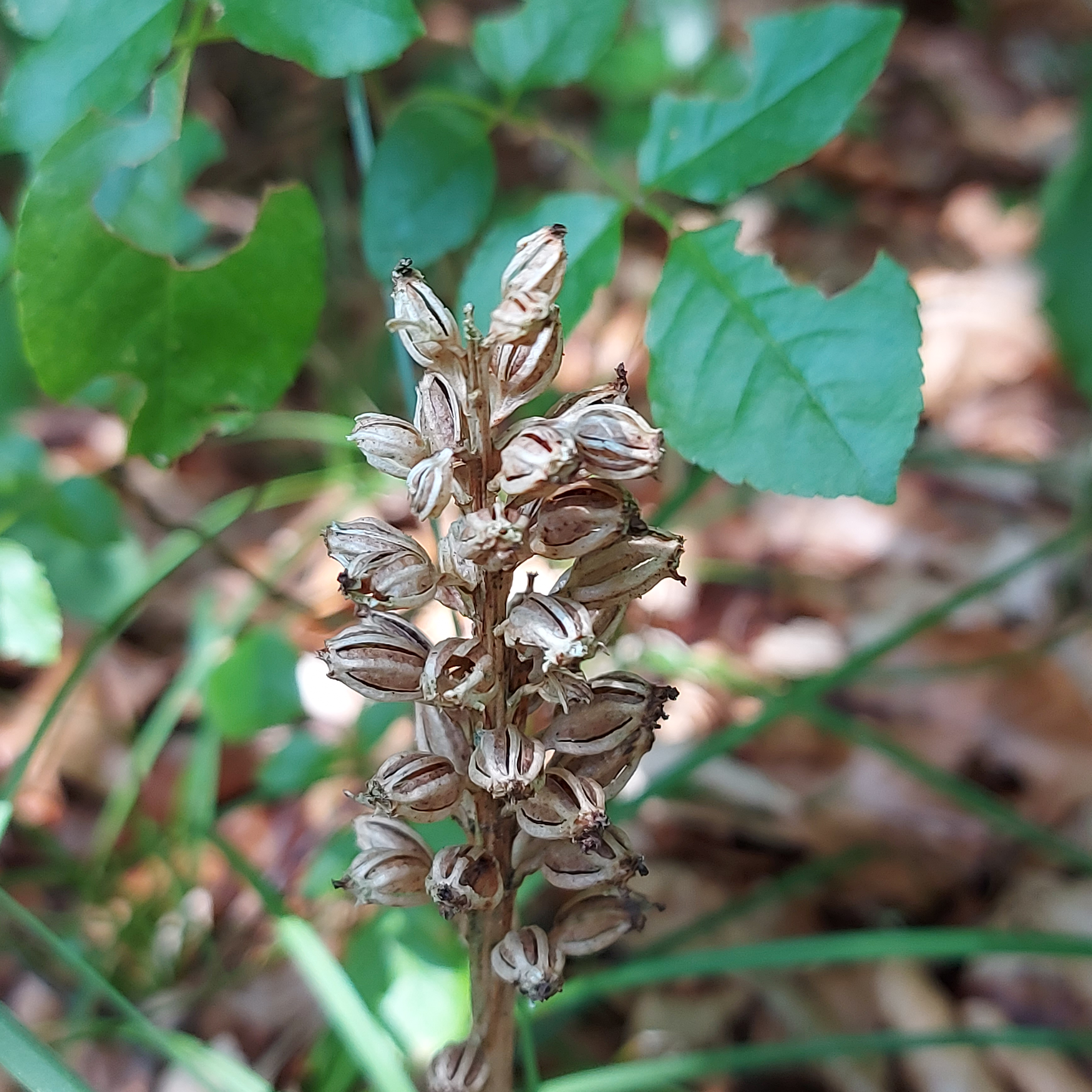
Fruiting, Grablja Vas.

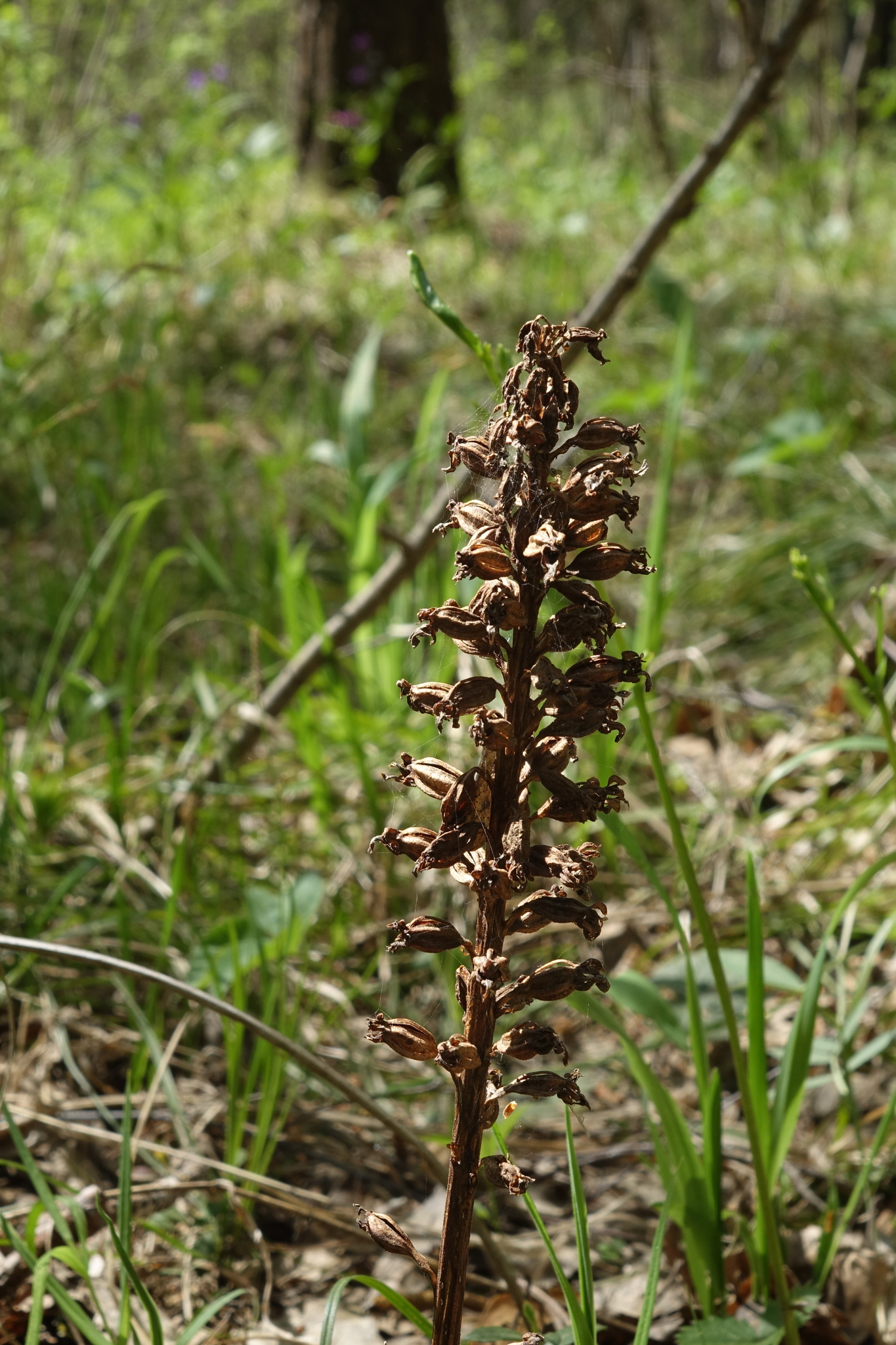
Dying, Novosibirsk.
