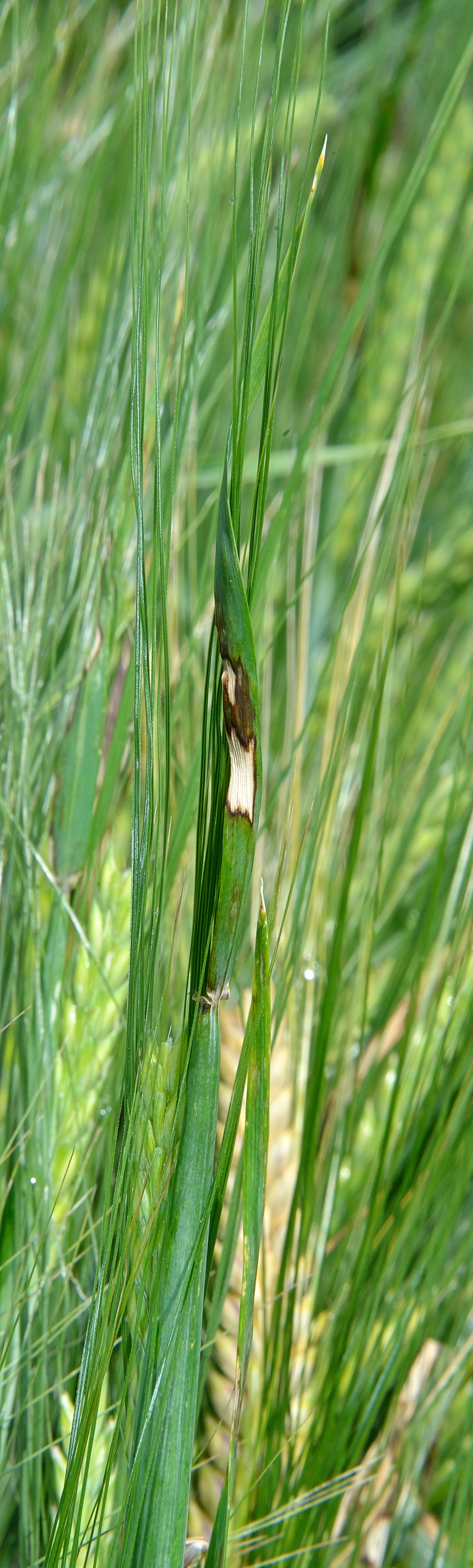

Scientific classification
- Kingdom: Fungi
- Division: Ascomycota
- Class: Leotiomycetes
- Order: Helotiales
- Family: Ploettnerulaceae
- Genus: Rhynchosporium
- Species: R. secalis

Binomial name
- Rhynchosporium secalis (Oudem.) Davis

Synonyms
- Marssonia secalis Oudem. (1897) Marssonina secalis (Oudem.) Magnus (1906) Rhynchosporium graminicola Heinsen (1897) Septocylindrium secalis Oudem.

= Rhynchosporium secalis =

Species of fungus

Rhynchosporium secalis is an ascomycete fungus that is the causal agent of barley and rye scald.

== Morphology ==
No sexual stage is known. The mycelium is hyaline to light gray and develops sparsely as a compact stroma under the cuticle of the host plant. Condia (2-4 x 12-20 μm) are borne sessilely on cells of the fertile stroma. They are hyaline, 1-septate, and cylindric to ovate, mostly with a short apical beak. Microconida have been reported, but their function is unknown. They are exuded from flasklike mycelial branches.

== Host species ==
- Agropyron dasystachyum, A. desertorum, A. elmeri, A. intermedium, A. riparium, A. scabriglume, A. semicostatum, A. subsecundum, A. trachycaulum, A. trachycaulum var. trachycaulum, A. trachycaulum var. unilaterale
- Agrostis gigantea, A. stolonifera, A. tenuis
- Alopecurus geniculatus, A. pratensis
- Bouteloua gracilis, B. hirsuta
- Bromus aleutensis, B. carinatus, B. ciliatus, B. frondosus, B. inermis, B. pumpellianus, B. secalinus, B. vulgaris
- Calamagrostis arundinacea, C. epigejos
- Chrysopogon gryllus
- Critesion murinum
- Cynodon dactylon
- Dactylis glomerata
- Danthonia sp.
- Deschampsia cespitosa
- Elymus angustus, E. canadensis, E. chinensis, E. glaucus, E. junceus, E. repens, E. virginicus
- Festuca pratensis, F. rubra
- Hordeum aegiceras, H. brachyantherum, H. distichon, H. hexastichon, H. jubatum, H. leporinum, H. murinum, H. vulgare, H. vulgare var. nudum, H. vulgare var. trifurcatum
- Leymus condensatus, L. innovatus, L. triticoides
- Lolium multiflorum, L. perenne, L. rigidum
- Microlaena stipoides
- Panicum sp.
- Phalaris arundinacea
- Phleum pratense
- Poa annua, P. eminens, P. pratensis
- Quercus chrysolepis
- Roegneria sp.
- Secale cereale, S. montanum
- × Triticosecale sp.
