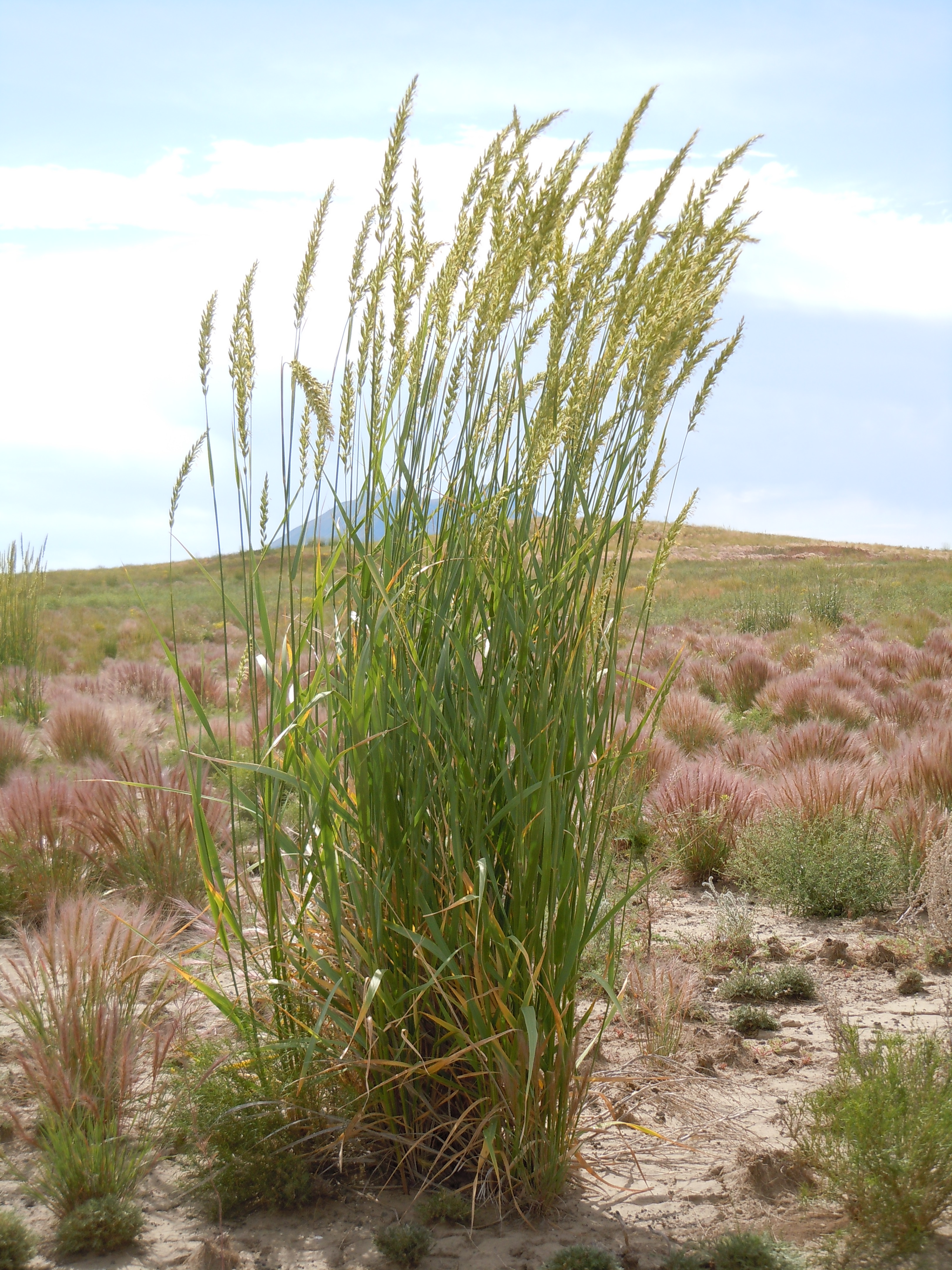

Conservation status
- Secure (NatureServe)

Scientific classification
- Kingdom: Plantae
- Clade: Tracheophytes
- Clade: Angiosperms
- Clade: Monocots
- Clade: Commelinids
- Order: Poales
- Family: Poaceae
- Subfamily: Pooideae
- Genus: Leymus
- Species: L. cinereus

Binomial name
- Leymus cinereus (Scribn. & Merr.) A.Löve

Synonyms
- Elymus cinereus Scribn. & Merr.; Elymus piperi Bowden

= Leymus cinereus =

Species of grass

Leymus cinereus is a species of wild rye known by the common names basin wild rye, Great Basin wild rye, and Great Basin lyme grass. It is common in western North America.

== Description ==
Leymus cinereus is a perennial bunchgrass forming large, tough clumps up to about 2 metres (6 1/2 feet) tall and sometimes exceeding 1 m (3 1/2 ft) in diameter. It has a large, fibrous root system and sometimes small rhizomes.

The inflorescence is an unbranched, cylindrical spike divided into up to 35 nodes with several flower spikelets per node.

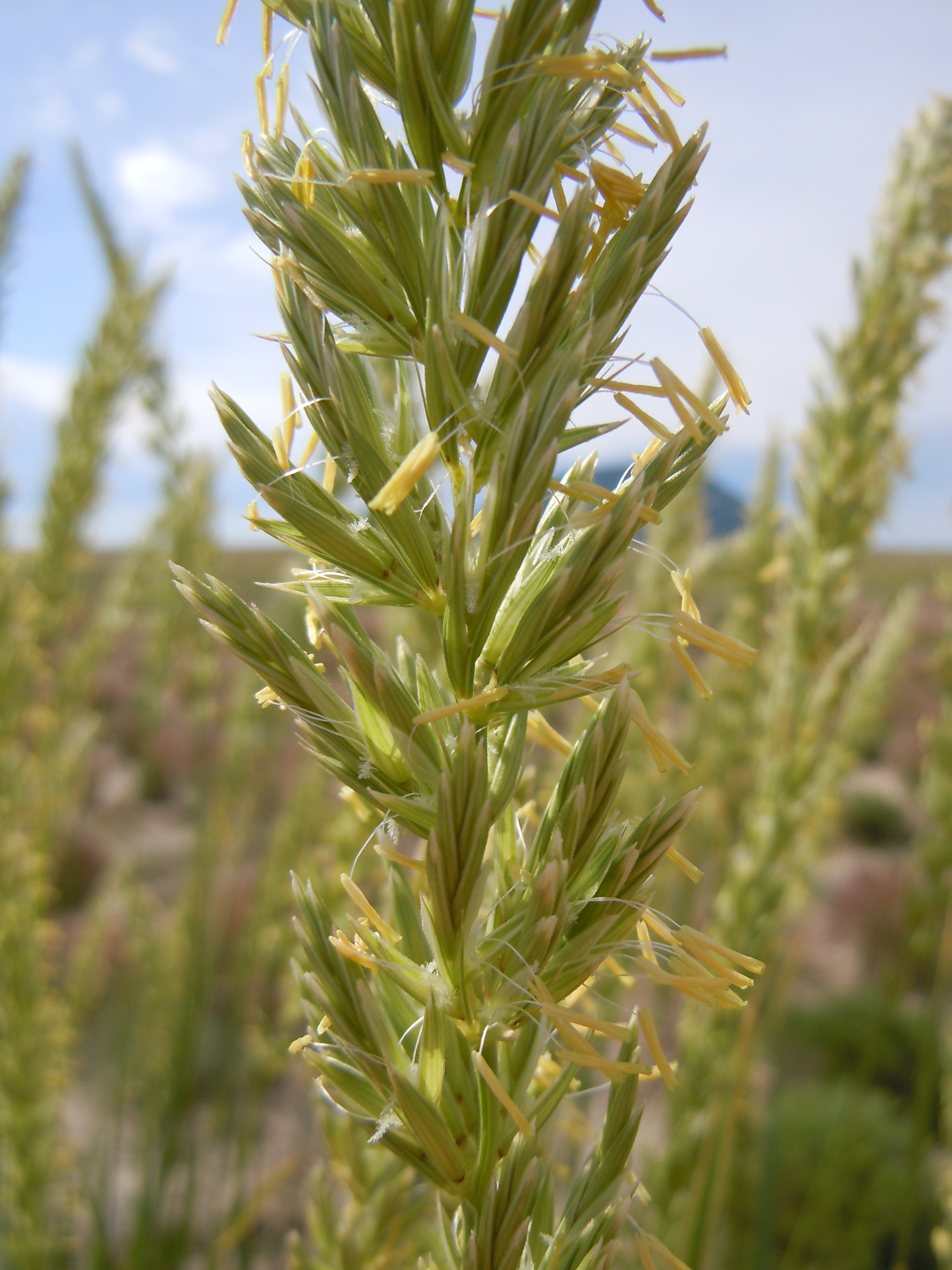
Flowering

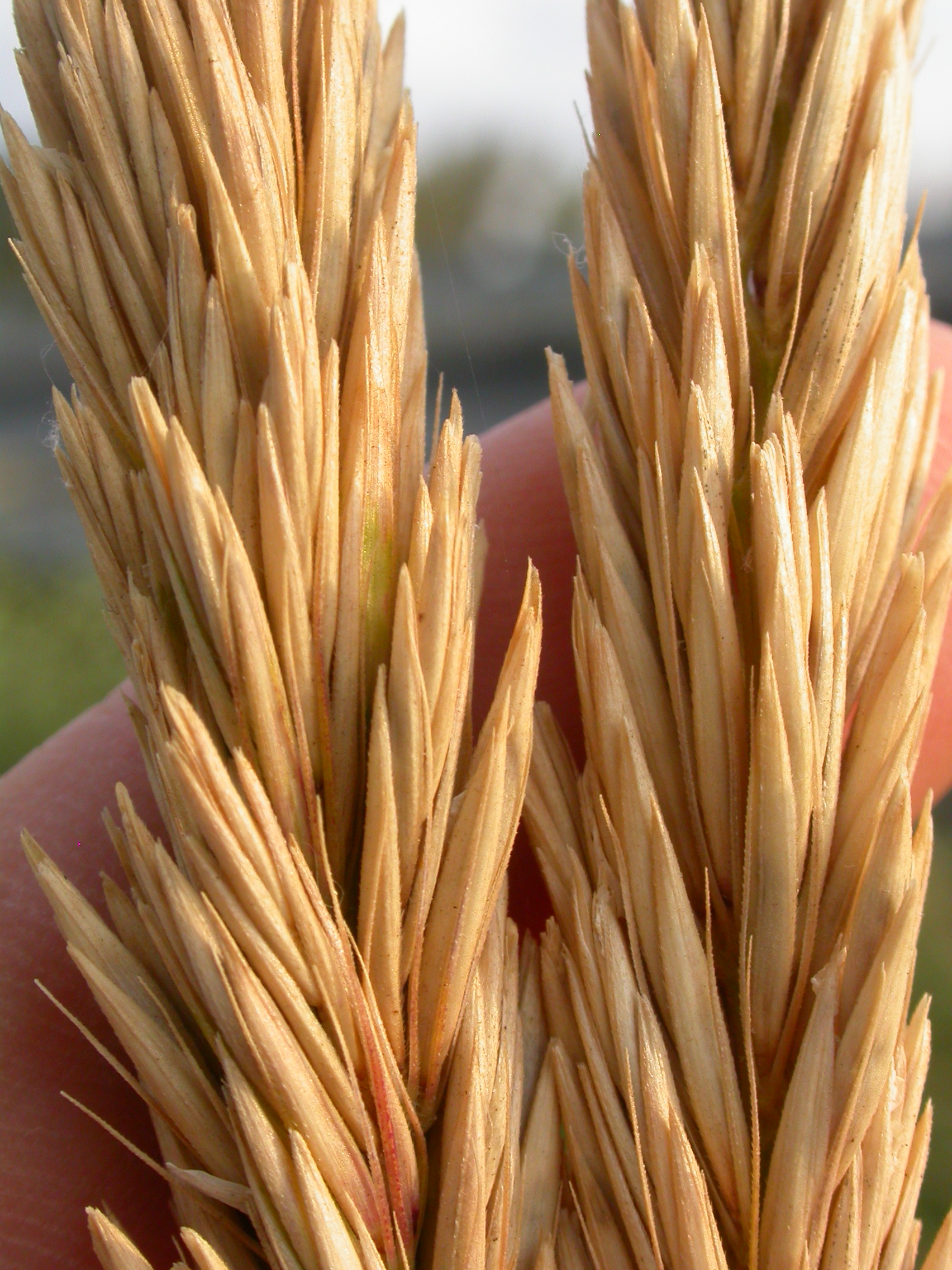
Close-up of the spikelets

== Distribution and habitat ==
Leymus cinereus is a common native grass of western North America, including western Canada and the United States from California to Minnesota. It grows in many types of habitat, including grassland and prairie, forests, scrub, chaparral, and sagebrush.

The species can be found in moist, semi-alkaline flats. In salt flats, it is replaced by Distichlis stricta.

== Ecology ==
The species may hybridize with Leymus triticoides, Leymus salina, and Elymus elymoides.

== Uses ==
Native American groups had a variety of uses for the grass. The Okanagan and Colville used the roots medicinally to treat internal bleeding and gonorrhea and as a hair tonic. The Cheyenne burned the grass and mixed the ash with blood to make a black dye. Various groups used it for bedding, floor coverings, arrows, and basketry.

Cultivars used in rangelands or site reclamation include 'Magnar' and 'Trailhead'.
