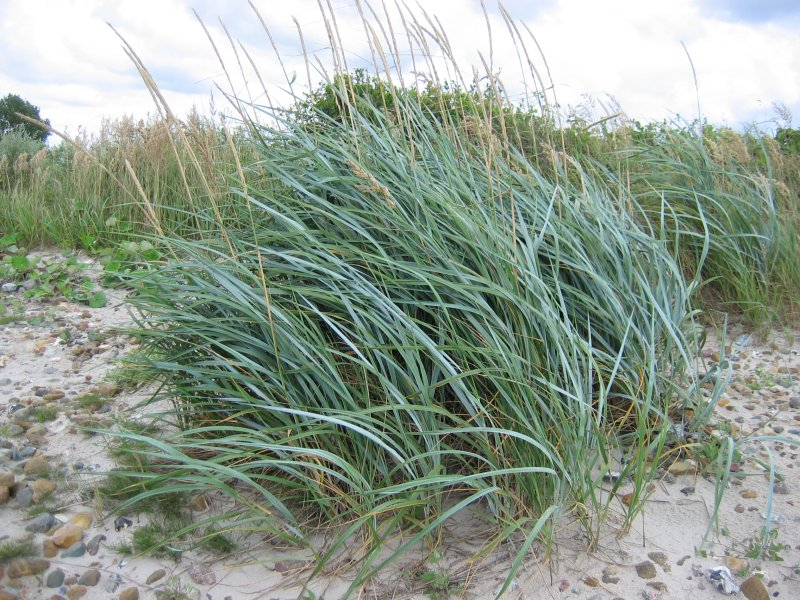

Scientific classification
- Kingdom: Plantae
- Clade: Tracheophytes
- Clade: Angiosperms
- Clade: Monocots
- Clade: Commelinids
- Order: Poales
- Family: Poaceae
- Subfamily: Pooideae
- Genus: Leymus
- Species: L. arenarius

Binomial name
- Leymus arenarius (L.) Hochst.

Synonyms
- Elymus arenarius L.

= Leymus arenarius =

Species of grass

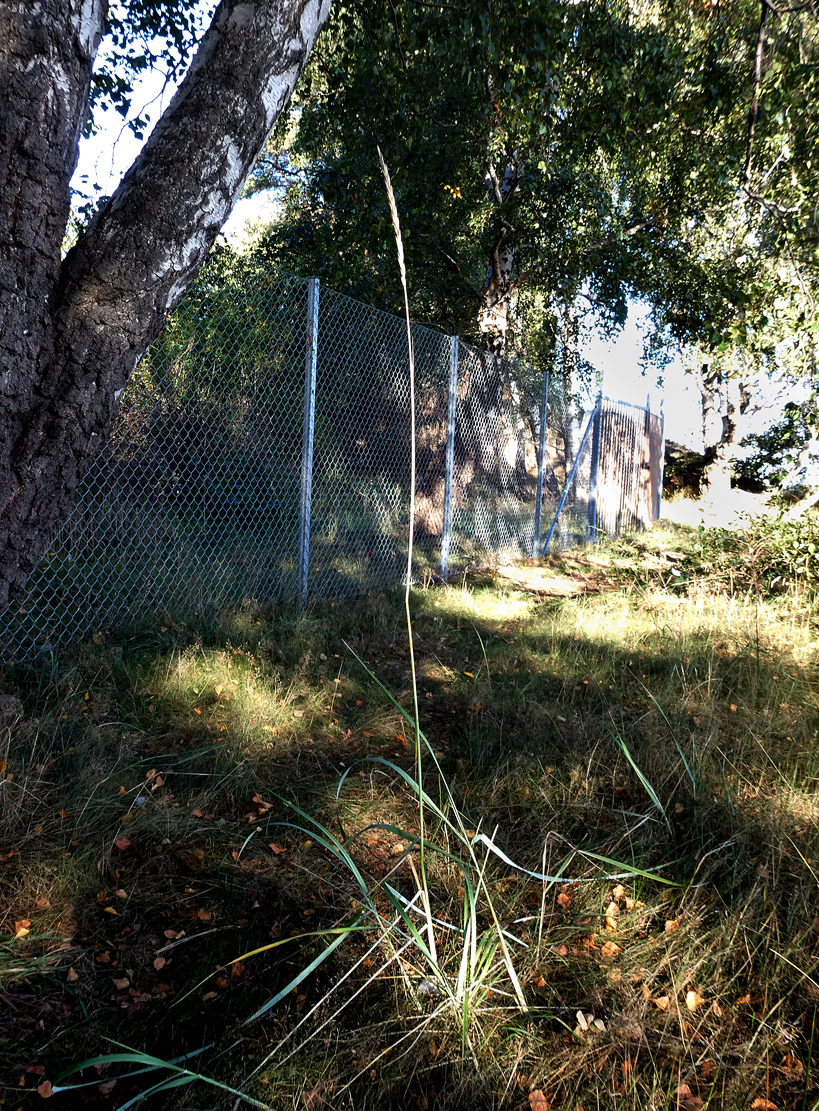
Leymus arenarius. 153 cm high.

Leymus arenarius is a psammophilic (sand-loving) species of grass in the family Poaceae, native to the coasts of Atlantic and Northern Europe. Leymus arenarius is commonly known as sand ryegrass, sea lyme grass, or simply lyme grass.

== Taxonomy ==
Leymus arenarius originated from the hybridization of L. racemosus and another unknown species in central Eurasia or from a polyploidization event. DNA analysis shows that inland and coastal plants are statistically not different from each other. L. arenarius is a relatively recent cultivar and has had little time to accumulate genetic differences. Leymus arenarius is much younger than its North American relative L. mollis, which has been around since the Ice Age. Icelandic L. arenarius is molecularly uniform, and Polish L. arenarius is also reported to be molecularly uniform.

== Distribution ==
Leymus arenarius is native to the coasts of northern and western Europe. A closely related species, Leymus mollis (previously Elymus arenarius ssp. mollis) is native to the northern coasts of North America.

== Growth and development ==
=== Nitrogen ===
Leymus arenarius can grow exponentially in terms of height and root development in the presence of nitrogen. L. arenarius is known to take up nitrogen into its root system. Increasing nitrogen concentrations can promote growth, as over time, the plant mass above the surface may not change, but nitrogen will accumulate in the root system. The roots themselves also retain nitrogen as they come in contact with it and the surrounding un-vegetated areas. This process aids in primary succession with surrounding flora and fauna, and helps reduce soil erosion. After volcanic events, L. arenarius contributes to the growth of dunes and their soil depth over time. Nitrogen also increases seed production, raising the seed yield by as much as 70% in Icelandic L. arenarius. Seed density also increases with the addition of nitrogen, in comparison to phosphorus and potassium, which only produce marginal increases in both seed yield and density. Leaf size and density are similarly influenced by nutrient additions. Removing nitrogen, phosphorus, or potassium resulted in a reduction of leaf mass by up to 20%. Nitrogen usage is a cost-effective strategy to increase abundance and effectiveness of L. arenarius.

=== Fungi ===
Leymus arenarius benefits from the presence of arbuscular mycorrhizal fungi. The presence of the fungi increases the ability of L. arenarius to have an extensive root system and to bind soil particles. When adding fungi in its natural habitat, more seeds survived and grew than without the fungi present.

=== Adaptability ===
Leymus arenarius can easily adapt to a highly salinized area. When comparing the salt tolerances of Icelandic populations to the inland populations, the Icelandic populations exhibit a higher tolerance to salt. The trait for salt tolerance is heritable. The seeds of Icelandic populations germinated more effectively in the presence of high salt concentration compared to seeds from inland population. In Finland the same salinity tolerance is observed near roadsides, where salt is distributed every season during snowfall. The pH near roadsides is similar to the pH found near saltwater beaches.

== Pathogene resistance ==
Leymus arenarius has strong immunity to pathogens. A total of 160 transcripts for antimicrobial peptides are present in seedlings, with 30 transcripts encoding unique antimicrobial peptides. These peptides are not found in other plant species, and contribute to the plant's immune system, enhancing its resistance to wider range of pathogens compared to its relatives.

== Uses ==
In Europe, the plant's stems are used for roof thatching and can be woven into a coarse fabric. The seeds were historically used as food. As early as the 18th century, the plant's extensive network of roots was utilized to stabilizing sands on northern coastal beaches. In Iceland, the grass was harvested as a wild grain as early as the 12th century.

== Law ==
During the 17th century, under the reign of William III, the Scottish Parliament passed a law protecting Leymus arenarius. In the 18th century, during the reign of George I, the British Parliament expanded this law to protect the plant along English coasts. The law even declared the cutting or possession of the grass to be a penal offense.
