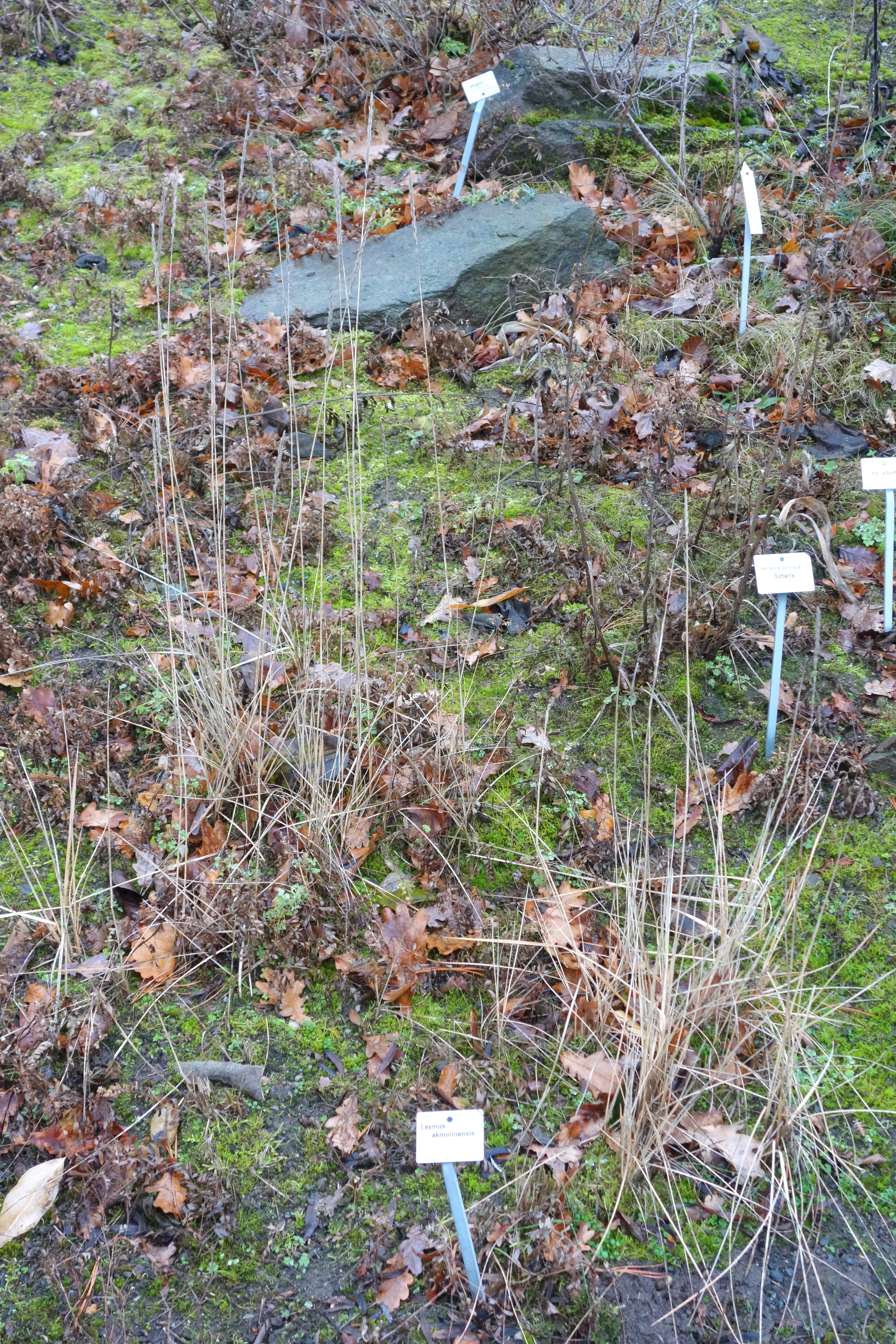

Scientific classification
- Kingdom: Plantae
- Clade: Embryophytes
- Clade: Tracheophytes
- Clade: Spermatophytes
- Clade: Angiosperms
- Clade: Monocots
- Clade: Commelinids
- Order: Poales
- Family: Poaceae
- Subfamily: Pooideae
- Genus: Leymus
- Species: L. akmolinensis

Binomial name
- Leymus akmolinensis (Drobow) Tzvelev

= Leymus akmolinensis =

Species of flowering plant

Leymus akmolinensis is a species of grass endemic to Russia and Kazakhstan.

== Synonyms ==
- Aneurolepidium akmolinense (Drobow) Nevski
- Elymus akmolinensis Drobow
- Elymus dasystachys f. glaber Korsh.
- Leymus paboanus subsp. akmolinensis (Drobow) Tzvelev
- Leymus paboanus subsp. korshinskyi Tzvelev
