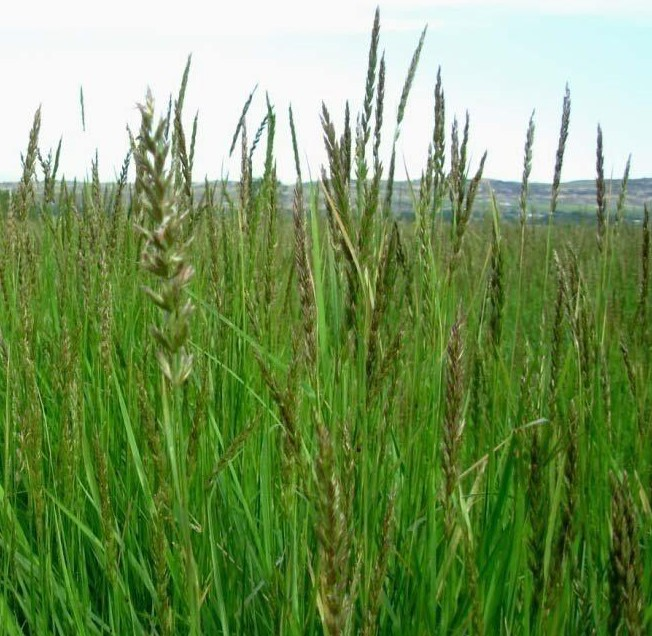

Scientific classification
- Kingdom: Plantae
- Clade: Tracheophytes
- Clade: Angiosperms
- Clade: Monocots
- Clade: Commelinids
- Order: Poales
- Family: Poaceae
- Subfamily: Pooideae
- Genus: Leymus
- Species: L. multicaulis

Binomial name
- Leymus multicaulis (Kar. & Kir.) Tzvelev

= Leymus multicaulis =

Species of grass

Leymus multicaulis, also known as manystem wild rye or manystem lyme grass, is a species of the genus Leymus. The species name of manystem wild rye, multicaulis, suggests the “many stems” of the species. Leymus multicaulis is considered a type of grass. Manystem wild rye has only one cotyledon in each of its seeds. The xylem and phloem within the roots are arranged in a ring pattern. The vascular bundles are scattered throughout the stem. These traits make Leymus multicaulis a monocot. Leymus multicaulis is a flowering plant, or angiosperm.

== Morphology ==
Leymus multicaulis can grow up to 19 to 32 inches tall. Leymus multicaulis grows in dense clumps, containing multiple stems. This wild rye can start its growth from a seed or a rhizome, growing into mature roots and stems. The stems are node-less and smooth. Hair follicles can be found on the stem, helping Leymus multicaulis trap water. The leaf blades are a dark shade of green. The leaves of Leymus multicaulis are inelastic in its early stages of growth. Once the plant has matured the leaves become rolled. The veins on the leaf form a parallel pattern, containing primary and secondary veins. The veins are widely spaced throughout the leaf. Leymus multicaulis is an allopolyploid organism, containing multiple complete sets of chromosomes.

== Habitat and ecology ==
Leymus multicaulis originates in Eurasia, its distribution extending from the Volga River Delta to Xinjiang, China. Only recently has Leymus multicaulis been introduced to the United States, particularly in the western regions, mainly Wyoming and Montana. Manystem wild rye is adapted to alkaline meadows and saline soils. It is also found growing as a weed throughout fields, roadsides and around human habitats. Leymus multicaulis is adapted to wet saline meadows, where there is heavy rainfall. From mountainous areas to bottomlands, Leymus multicaulis is able to grow productively. Unlike the other species of genus Leymus, L. multicaulis can tolerate harsh winter conditions.

== Usage ==
There are many uses for Leymus multicaulis. Many Leymus species are primarily used as a food source. Leymus multicaulis is mainly used for recovery of wet, saline soils. It can also be put to use on saline-affected, weakened cropland and pastureland. Manystem wild rye has many uses for maintaining cropland and pastureland throughout Eurasia and western United States. It helps in retaining the soil by inhibiting wind and water effects. It is also a major food source to livestock and wildlife.

== Establishment ==
Leymus multicaulis is a relatively easy plant to grow. In northern regions, it is highly recommended to plant Leymus multicaulis seeds during the fall season. This allows the seed coat to become more active. If planted during the spring, the seed coat stays inactive and must be mechanically broken. One to two years are required for the manystem wild rye to grow into a mature plant. Seeds are initially weak and develop at slow rates. The seedlings are no match for weeds. It is best to plant a seedling in an area with low concentration of weeds. Leymus multicaulis is tolerant of cold weather; this allows the wild rye to continue development as the winter season passes. Once the plant has matured, the manystem wild rye grass can live a long life. The surroundings of the mature Leymus multicaulis can influence the lifespan of the plant. For example, if the mature plant is in an area with high concentration of nitrogen, it is in a healthy environment and will have a longer lifespan. If there are high concentrations of salt and low levels of moisture it will not survive very long. The environment of the developing Leymus multicaulis plays a major role in the lifespan of the plant.

== Research with Leymus multicaulis ==
Its uniqueness within genus Leymus makes it a popular species to study. Morphology and Cytology of Intergeneric Hybrids involving Leymus multicaulis was a research project conducted by Gen-Lou Sun, Chi-Yen, and Jun-Liang Yang in 1994. They hybridized Leymus multicaulis with three different species, Psathyrostachys huashanica, Psathyrostachys juncea, and Leymus secalinus. Sun, Yang and Yen tested and studied the morphology and meiotic behavior in the pollen mother cells of the hybrid species. They found that the hybrid species showed intraspecific pairing between the Leymus species, being more frequent in Leymus and wheat hybrids. A study by Kesara Anamthawat-Jónsson and Sigrídur K Bödvarsdóttir later used the results of the first study to find high genetic diversity within Leymus and Psathyrostachys.
