= Scald (barley disease) =

Fungal disease of barley

- Causal agents: Rhynchosporium commune
- Hosts: barley
- EPPO Code: RHYNSE
- Distribution: temperate regions

Scald is common disease of barley in temperate regions. It is caused by the fungus Rhynchosporium commune and can cause significant yield losses in cooler, wet seasons.

== Symptoms ==
Scald is a foliar disease of barley affecting the leaves and sheaths of the plant; however, lesions may also occur on coleoptiles, glumes, floral bracts and awns. Initial symptoms are oval, water-soaked, grayish-green spots, 1.0-1.5 cm long. As the disease develops, the centers of the lesions dry and bleach, becoming light gray, tan, or white with a dark brown margin. The lesions are not delimited by the leaf veins and often coalesce.

== Disease cycle ==
The fungus can infect and survive in barley seed. It exists as mycelium in the pericarp and hull of infected seeds. Infection of the coleoptile occurs as it emerges from the embryo. Optimal infections occur at soil temperatures of 16C. At soil temperatures of 22C or higher, very little infection occurs.

In spring cropping systems, the fungus overwinters on the crop debris and stubble of previous diseased barley crops. The fungus produces abundant conidia on wet lesions during cool, damp weather after the leaf tissue has become necrotic. Conidia, spread by wind and splashing rain, infect young leaves of spring- planted grain. Optimum temperatures for sporulation and infection range from 10-18C. Hot, dry weather reduces the rate of disease development.

== Geographical distribution and economic importance ==
The disease is economically important in Europe, North America and Australia. It has been reported from South America, Africa, the Middle east, Japan and Korea. Yield losses as high as 35-40% have been reported, however, losses of 1-10% are more common. Yield loss is primarily due to reduced kernel weight, but both kernels per head and number of heads per plant may also been affected.

In the wetter areas of the United Kingdom, scald is the most damaging disease of barley, affecting both spring and winter crops. In the Victoria area of Australia, scald is widespread in barley crops in most seasons, but its severity varies greatly from crop to crop and between seasons. In Victoria, scald causes annual average yield losses of 10-20%, with individual losses as high as 45% in susceptible varieties. In Canada, yield losses in Alberta have been calculated at 2.4 per cent, although losses in particular fields may exceed 25 per cent. Losses are due to a decrease in photosynthetic area on the flag and second leaves resulting in reduced seed weight.

== Management ==
Management of the disease involves the use of clean and/or treated seeds, resistant cultivars, crop rotation, residue management, and foliar fungicides.

=== Resistant cultivars ===
Cultivars with scald resistance are available in all major barley growing areas. The level of resistance occurs along a spectrum and the degree of resistance that is required to effectively control the disease will depend on the region where it is grown, cropping practices that reduce initial disease inoculum, wetter conditions and fungal pathotypes.

=== Fungicides ===
Foliar fungicides can be used to effectively control disease development. Product selection, application rates and timing, depend upon numerous factors.

The availability of fungicides as a management tool depends on whether the product has been evaluated and registered for use in a specific country or region.

Foliar fungicides: azoxystrobin^{1}, bromuconazole^{1}, cyproconazole^{1}, epoxiconazole^{1}, fluquinconazole^{1}, flusilazole^{1}, propiconazole^{1, 2, 3}, prochloraz^{1}, pyraclostrobin^{2}, tebuconazole^{1}

Seed treatment fungicides: triadimenol^{2}

1. Registered for use in Europe.
2. Registered for use in Canada.
3. Registered for use in the US.

==== Fungicide resistance ====
In the United Kingdom, there are issues concerning MBC fungicides and some of the triazole fungicides (e.g. flusilazole and epoxiconazole). To date there are no issues with strobilurin fungicides (QoI fungicides), but the situation is being monitored closely. There are currently no issues concerning chlorothalonil, cyprodinil or the morpholines.
