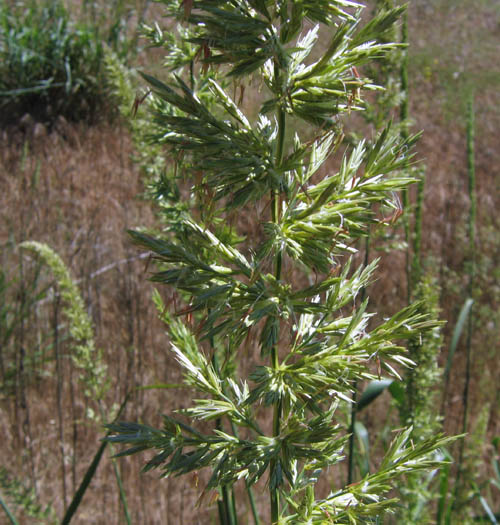

Conservation status
- Vulnerable (NatureServe)

Scientific classification
- Kingdom: Plantae
- Clade: Tracheophytes
- Clade: Angiosperms
- Clade: Monocots
- Clade: Commelinids
- Order: Poales
- Family: Poaceae
- Subfamily: Pooideae
- Genus: Leymus
- Species: L. condensatus

Binomial name
- Leymus condensatus (J.Presl) Á.Löve

Synonyms
- Aneurolepidium condensatum Elymus condensatus

= Leymus condensatus =

Species of tree

Leymus condensatus, the giant wildrye, is a wild rye grass native to eastern Oregon, California and northern Mexico.

== Description ==
Leymus condensatus also commonly referred to as Canyon Prince is a type of wild rye that is part of the Poaceae (Grass Family). It grows in bunches or clumps, a bunch grass, stays green all year, and has a distinctive silver blue foliage. It is drought tolerant, growing in coastal sage scrub, chaparral, the California oak woodlands of southern oak woodland and foothill woodland, and Joshua tree woodlands, rarely in wetlands. It often hybridizes with Leymus triticoides, producing the common hybrid grass Leymus x multiflorus. The plant's leaves and seeds are often consumed by both mammals and birds.
