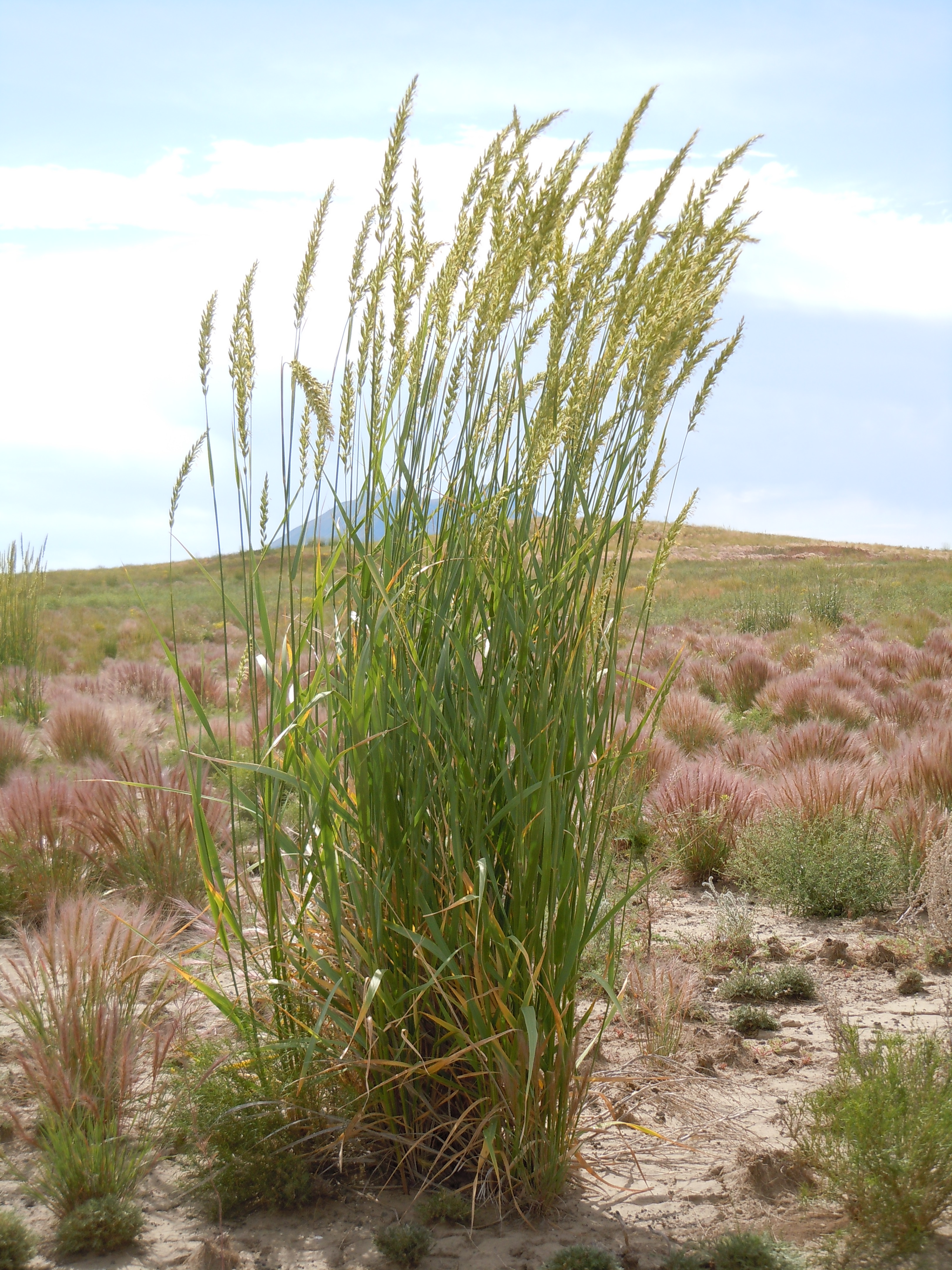
- Leymus cinereus

Scientific classification
- Kingdom: Plantae
- Clade: Tracheophytes
- Clade: Angiosperms
- Clade: Monocots
- Clade: Commelinids
- Order: Poales
- Family: Poaceae
- Subfamily: Pooideae
- Supertribe: Triticodae
- Tribe: Triticeae
- Genus: Leymus; Hochst.

Type species
- Leymus arenarius (L.) Hochst.

Synonyms
- Elymus sect. Leymus (Hochst.) Honda; Aneurolepidium Nevski; Eremium Seberg & Linde-Laursen; Macrohystrix (Tzvelev) Tzvelev & Prob.; Malacurus Nevski; Microhystrix (Tzvelev) Tzvelev & Prob.

= Leymus =

Genus of grasses

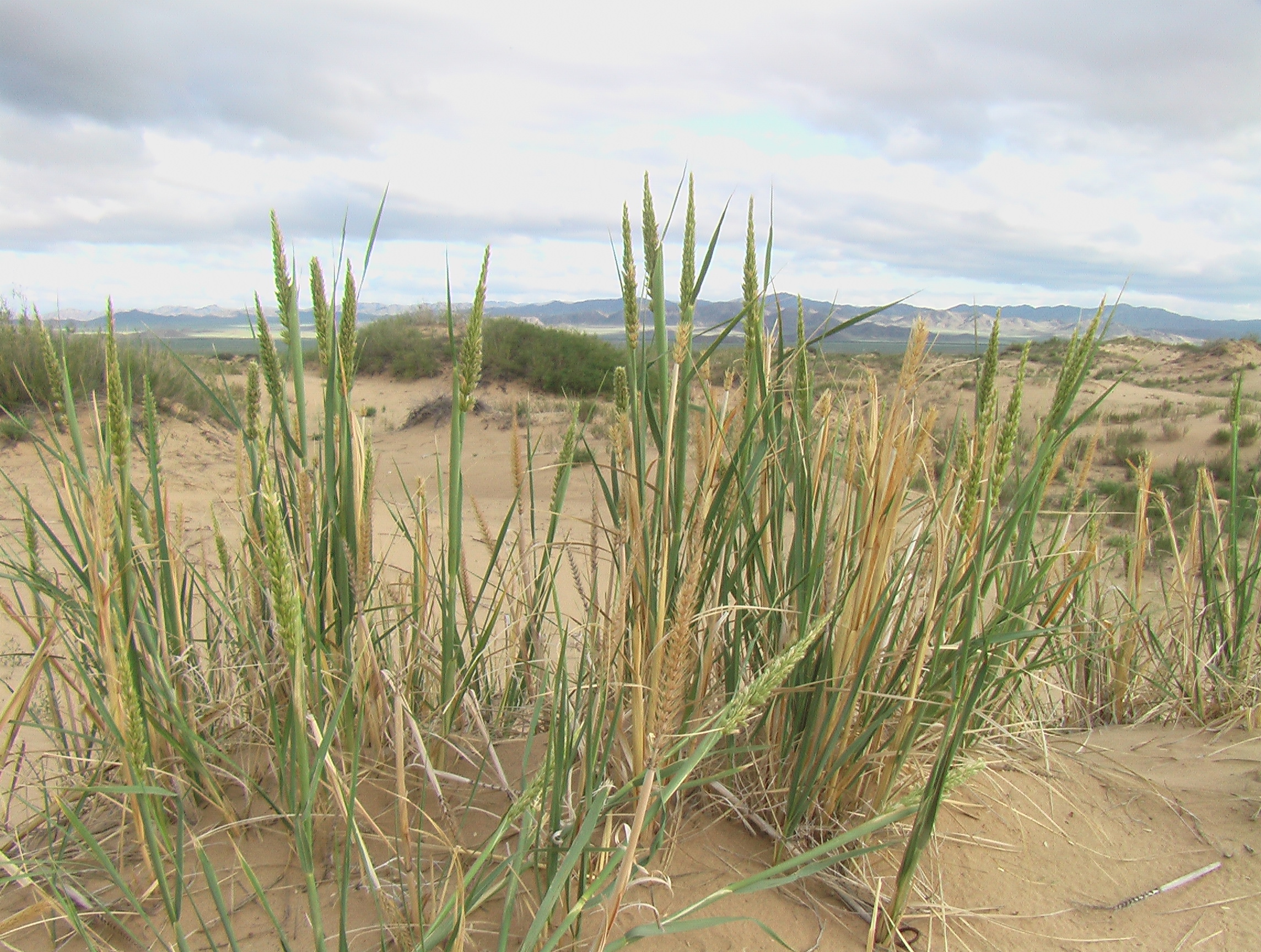
Mammoth wild rye (Leymus racemosus)

Leymus is a genus of plants in the grass family Poaceae (Gramineae). It is widespread across Europe, Asia, and the Americas.

- Leymus aemulans - Xinjiang, Central Asia
- Leymus ajanensis - Siberia, Russian Far East, Alaska
- Leymus akmolinensis - Siberia, Kazakhstan, European Russia
- Leymus alaicus - Central Asia
- Leymus altus - Xinjiang
- Leymus ambiguus - mountains of western US
- Leymus angustus - Altai wild rye - China, Mongolia, Siberia, Central Asia
- Leymus arenarius - lyme grass - Europe
- Leymus aristiglumus - Qinghai
- Leymus × buriaticus - Siberia
- Leymus cappadocicus - Turkey, Afghanistan
- Leymus chinensis - China, Korea, Mongolia, Amur, Siberia
- Leymus cinereus - basin wild rye - western North America (US and Canada)
- Leymus condensatus - giant wild rye - California, Baja California, Coahuila
- Leymus crassiusculus - Qinghai, Shanxi
- Leymus divaricatus - Kazakhstan
- Leymus duthiei - China, Korea, Japan, Nepal, northern India
- Leymus erianthus - Chile, Argentina
- Leymus × fedtschenkoi - Kyrgyzstan
- Leymus flavescens - Alberta, northwestern US
- Leymus flexilis - Kyrgyzstan, Kazakhstan
- Leymus flexus - Qinghai, Gansu, Shanxi
- Leymus innovatus - from Alaska and Northwest Territories to South Dakota and Ontario
- Leymus × jenisseiensis - Siberia
- Leymus karelinii - Xinjiang, Central Asia, European Russia
- Leymus komarovii - China, Mongolia, Korea, Russian Far East
- Leymus kopetdaghensis - Turkmenistan
- Leymus lanatus - Kyrgyzstan, Tajikistan, Afghanistan
- Leymus latiglumis - Uzbekistan
- Leymus leptostachyus - Qinghai, Xinjiang
- Leymus mollis - colder parts of Asia and North America
- Leymus multicaulis - European Russia, Central Asia, Xinjiang
- Leymus × multiflorus - California
- Leymus mundus - Tibet, Gansu
- Leymus nikitinii - Turkmenistan
- Leymus oblongolemmatus - Qinghai
- Leymus obvipodus - Qinghai
- Leymus ordensis - Siberia
- Leymus paboanus - Russia, China, Mongolia, Central Asia, Afghanistan
- Leymus pacificus - California
- Leymus paucispiculus - Qinghai, Gansu
- Leymus pendulus - Qinghai
- Leymus pishanicus - Xinjiang
- Leymus pluriflorus - Qinghai, Gansu
- Leymus pseudoracemosus - Qinghai
- Leymus pubinodis - Xinjiang
- Leymus racemosus - mammoth wild rye - Eurasia from Bulgaria to Mongolia
- Leymus × ramosoides - European Russia
- Leymus ramosus - Eurasia from Crimea to Mongolia
- Leymus ruoqiangensis - Xinjiang, Qinghai
- Leymus salina - western US
- Leymus secalinus - Siberia, Mongolia, China, Korea, Central Asia, Himalayas
- Leymus shanxiensis - Shanxi
- Leymus sibiricus - Russia from Altai Krai to Magadan
- Leymus × sphacelatus - Tuva
- Leymus spiniformis - Qinghai, Shanxi
- Leymus tianschanicus - Iran, Central Asia, Xinjiang, Inner Mongolia
- Leymus triticoides - creeping wild rye - British Columbia, western US, Baja California, Tamaulipas
- Leymus × tuvinicus - Siberia
- Leymus × vancouverensis - British Columbia, Washington, Oregon, California
- Leymus villosissimus - Yakutia, Magadan, Kamchatka, Alaska, Yukon, Northwest Territories, British Columbia
- Leymus yiunensis - Xinjiang

== Butterfly food plant ==
Butterflies whose caterpillars feed on Leymus include the Zabulon skipper.
