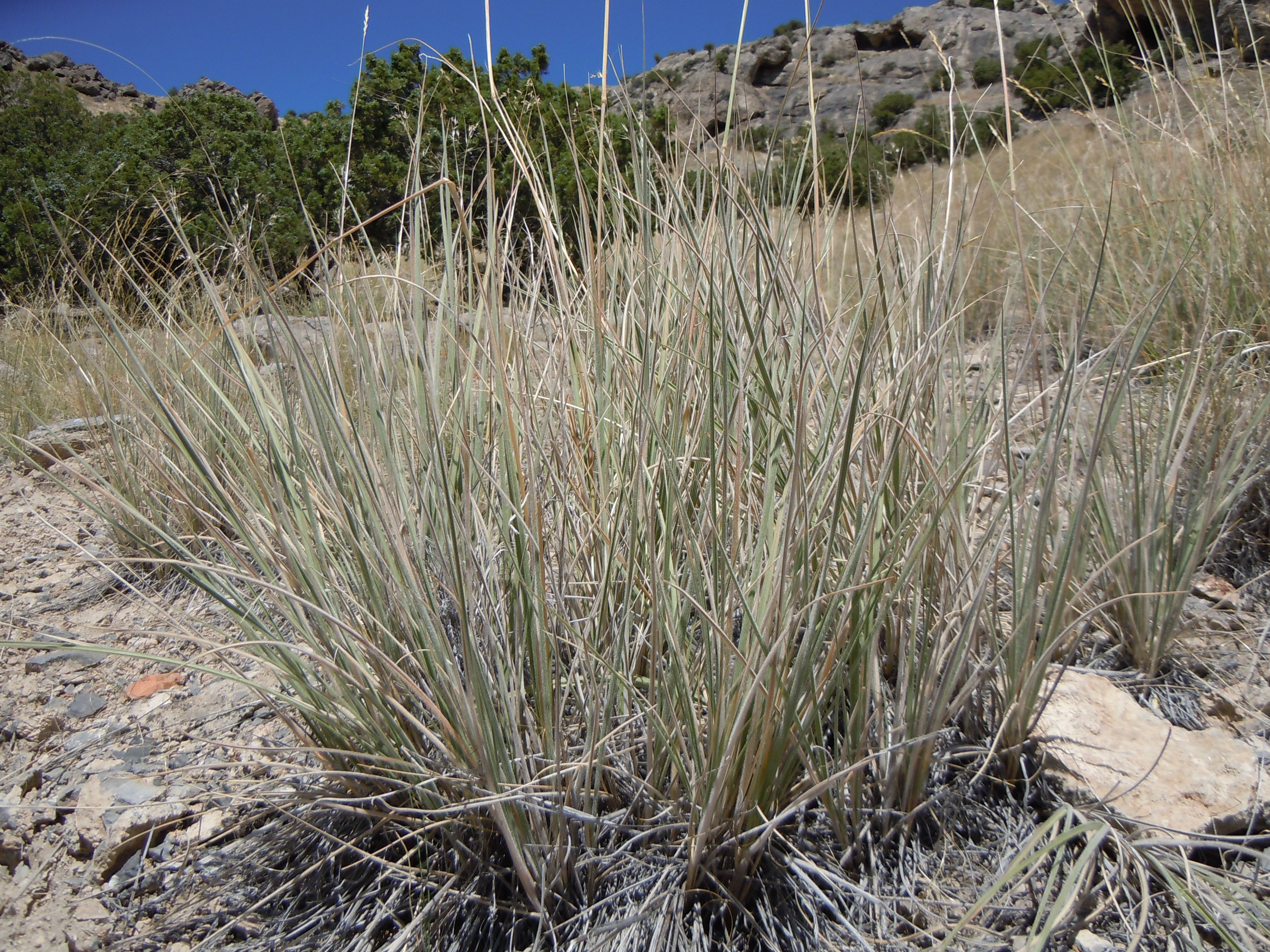

Conservation status
- Apparently Secure (NatureServe)

Scientific classification
- Kingdom: Plantae
- Clade: Tracheophytes
- Clade: Angiosperms
- Clade: Monocots
- Clade: Commelinids
- Order: Poales
- Family: Poaceae
- Subfamily: Pooideae
- Genus: Leymus
- Species: L. ambiguus

Binomial name
- Leymus ambiguus (Vasey & Scribn.) D.R.Dewey

= Leymus ambiguus =

Species of flowering plant

Leymus ambiguus is a species of grass known by the common names Colorado wildrye and Rocky Mountain wildrye. It is native to the Rocky Mountains of the United States, growing mainly on rocky hillsides on the eastern slopes of the mountains in Colorado and New Mexico; it has also been reported from Utah. It is a climax species on the dry grasslands of the Colorado Front Range.

This perennial grass produces loose clumps of stems of about 60 centimetres (24 in) to 110 centimetres (43 in) high, each of which is about 1 millimetre (0.039 in) thick. It is sometimes rhizomatous. Most of the leaves are located around the bases of the stems. The inflorescence is up to about 17 centimeters long and has solitary or paired spikelets, each containing up to 7 to 10 flowers. The grass has been noted to produce about 390 seeds per plant. The seeds germinate well and the seedlings grow fast.
