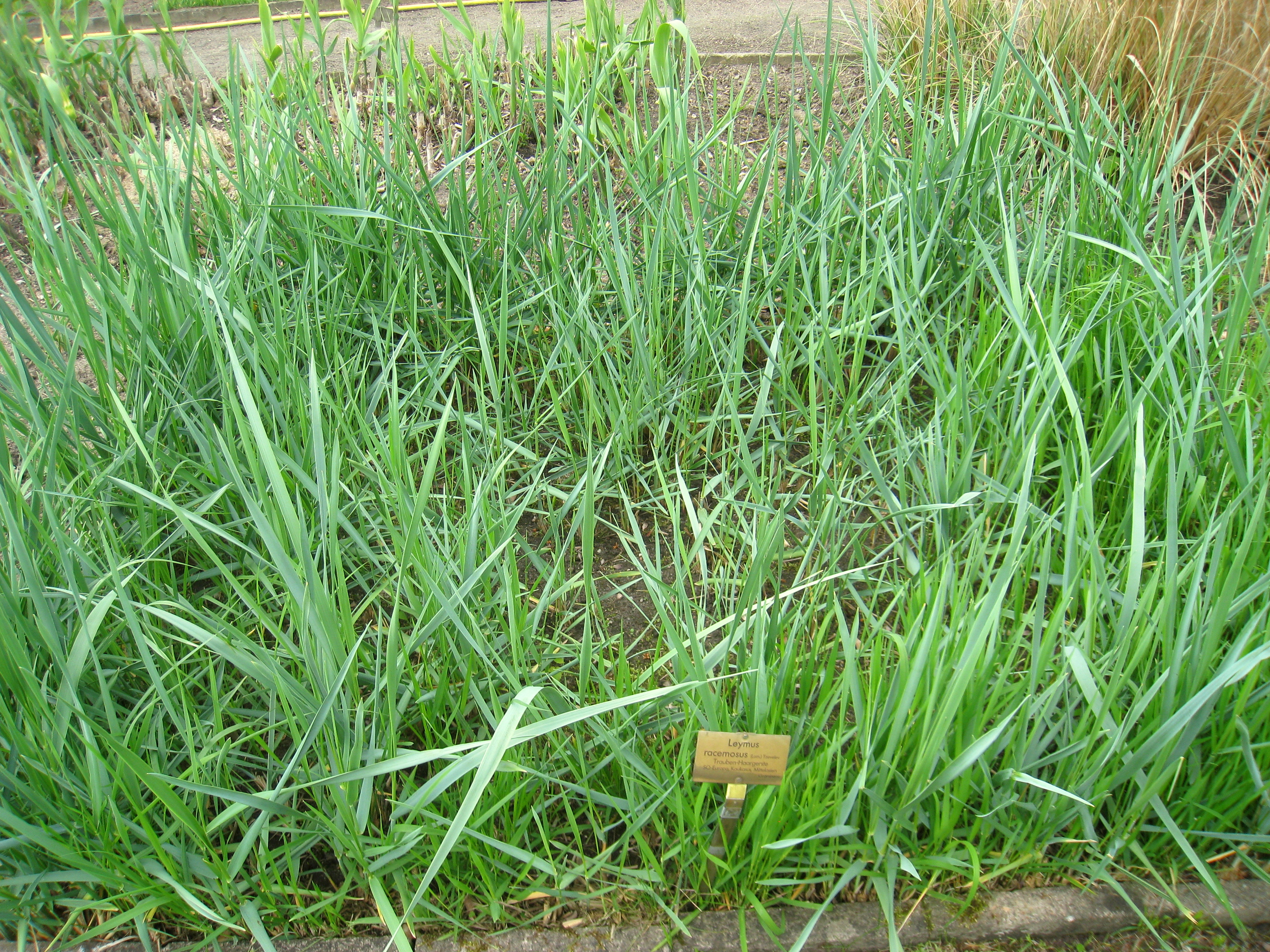

Scientific classification
- Kingdom: Plantae
- Clade: Tracheophytes
- Clade: Angiosperms
- Clade: Monocots
- Clade: Commelinids
- Order: Poales
- Family: Poaceae
- Subfamily: Pooideae
- Genus: Leymus
- Species: L. racemosus

Binomial name
- Leymus racemosus (Lam.) Tzvelev

= Leymus racemosus =

Species of grass

Leymus racemosus is a species of perennial wild rye known by the common name mammoth wild rye. It is native to southeastern and eastern Europe, Middle Asia, the Caucasus, Siberia, China, Mongolia, and parts of North America. In New Zealand, it is an introduced species and is regarded as an environmental weed. Culms are 50–100 cm long, and 10–12 mm in diameter.

Wheat is the primary source of grain in the human food supply worldwide today. Especially with the current population boom, there is a strong pressure to increase wheat production to sustain the global food demand. Several factors threaten crop expansion into new areas. Scientists have been investigating evolutionary relatives of wheat to incorporate into the modern cultivar to improve its resistance to biotic and abiotic stresses. Leymus racemosus is one such relative that has shown tremendous potential in this regard.

Leymus racemosus is a perennial grass species that inhabits a wide variety of terrains, such as wet forests, drylands, coasts and soils with high saline concentrations. Introgression lines of L. racemosus have shown a stronger response to heat stress in terms of increased grain yields per spike. This is significant because heat stress significantly limits wheat production in tropical climates. High temperatures impose morphological changes that decrease production. Wheat grows optimally at temperatures between 18-24 degrees Celsius. Studies have shown that wheat exposure to temperatures between 28-32 degrees Celsius for a week can decrease crop yield by 20%. At the molecular level, this is linked to disrupting the thylakoid membranes on chloroplasts involved in photosynthesis.

Leymus racemosus genes have also been shown to improve the modern cultivar's resistance to Fusarium Head Blight, a fungal infection that reduces grain quality and yield. This disease is usually found in warm and humid climates where wheat grows; however, scab epidemics have become more pervasive across North America and Europe due to climate change. Studies have isolated the specific genes that confer scab resistance, a disease characterized by lesions on the tuber, leaf or stem. These genes were incorporated into modern wheat, which displayed higher resistance to the fungal infection as compared with wheat lines that were not modified with L. racemosus genes.

Another major threat to the expansion of wheat is aluminum toxicity in soil, which represents 40% of the world's arable land. Though the exact mechanism of aluminum toxicity is unclear, scientists know that it inhibits root cell growth by blocking Ca2+ channels, ultimately disrupting transport and communication within the plant. Soil limiting is a practice used to deter Al toxicity by raising the pH of the soil. However, this can be costly and difficult to implement on a large scale. Thus, investigating the use of more tolerant plants is a noteworthy effort. L. racemosus genes helped prevent root growth reduction when incorporated into modern wheat cultivars. This indicates a higher tolerance of Al induced stress.

Leymus racemosus genes have also been shown to have a positive impact on reducing nitrogen levels in an agricultural system through biological nitrification inhibition (BNI). This finding is significant because nitrogen loss threatens the success of plants and currently the only way to prevent this problem is through the use of artificial inhibitors. Studies have isolated genes that have high BNI properties from the L. racemosus plant that can be incorporated into modern cultivar as a novel strategy to mitigate the effects on nitrogen pollution on a wheat cultivation area. Overall, L. racemosus is tolerant to many of the biotic and abiotic stressors that limit modern wheat growth. Studying this evolutionary ancestor is key because it provides answers to expanding wheat production and sustaining the global food demand, especially given the future threats of climate change and limited arable land.

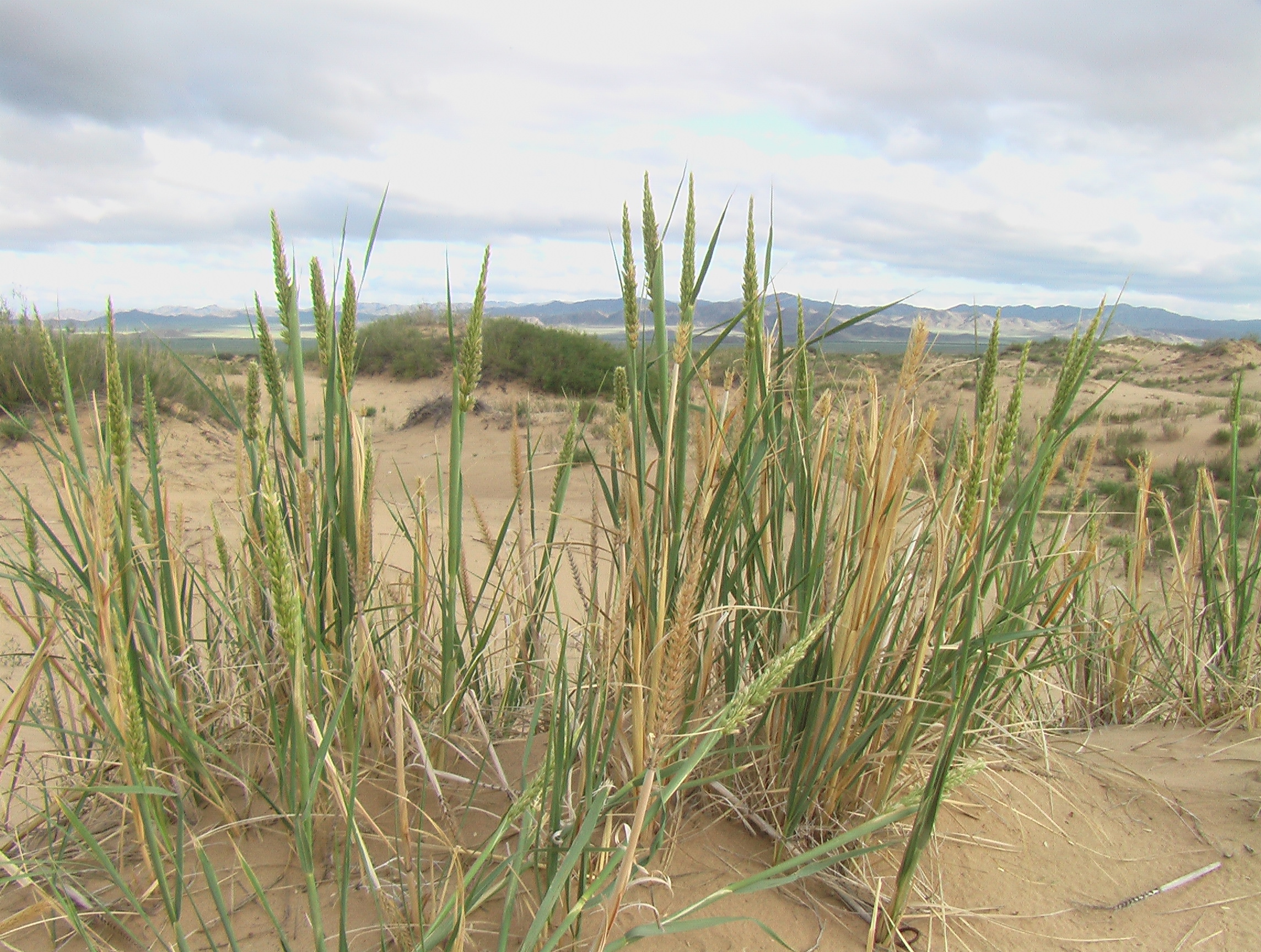
Mammoth Wild Rye (Leymus racemosus) in Mongolia.

== Status in New Zealand ==
In New Zealand, Leymus racemosus is classified as an environmental weed. According to the New Zealand Plant Conservation Network, it spreads via rhizomes and can form dense stands that displace native vegetation.
