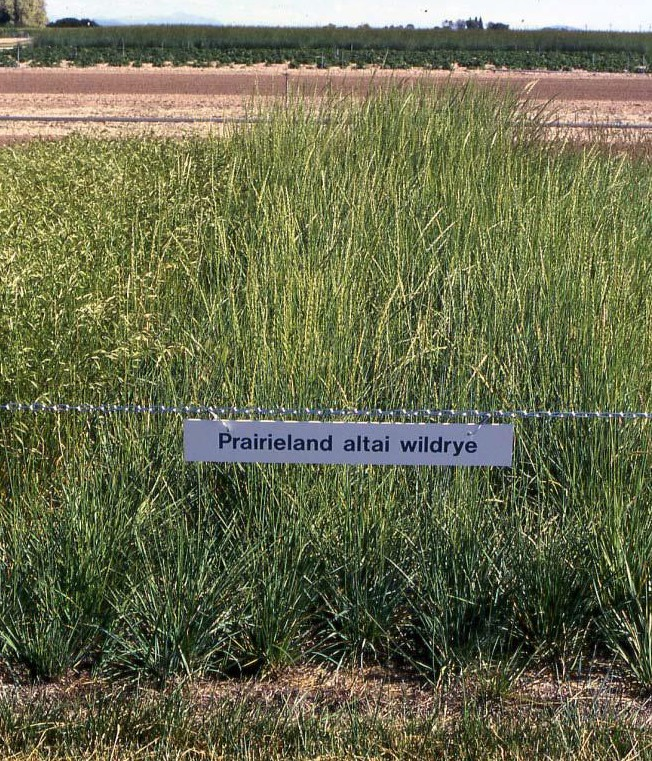

Scientific classification
- Kingdom: Plantae
- Clade: Tracheophytes
- Clade: Angiosperms
- Clade: Monocots
- Clade: Commelinids
- Order: Poales
- Family: Poaceae
- Subfamily: Pooideae
- Genus: Leymus
- Species: L. angustus

Binomial name
- Leymus angustus (Trin.) Pilg.

= Leymus angustus =

Species of grass

Leymus angustus is a species of grass known by the common name Altai wildrye. It is native to Asia and Europe and it is cultivated elsewhere as a pasture grass, especially in Canada.

This rhizomatous perennial grass produces stems up to 1.2 metres tall. The leaves are mostly located around the base of the stems. The stiff, waxy-textured leaf blades are up to 20 cm long. They are light green to blue in color. The inflorescence is a spike up to 25 cm long by 1 wide. Each spikelet is one or two centimetres long and contains 2 or 3 flowers.

In its native habitat this grass grows in alkaline meadows and on sandy and gravelly valleys. It is tolerant of some salinity and it can be planted on saline substrates.

The grass is cultivated as a forage for livestock. It grows for a long time, from spring to fall, and it provides forage into the winter. It is difficult to make into hay, however. It establishes slowly but it competes well with weeds once established. There are several cultivars available, including 'Eejay', 'Prairieland', 'Mustang', and 'Pearl'.
