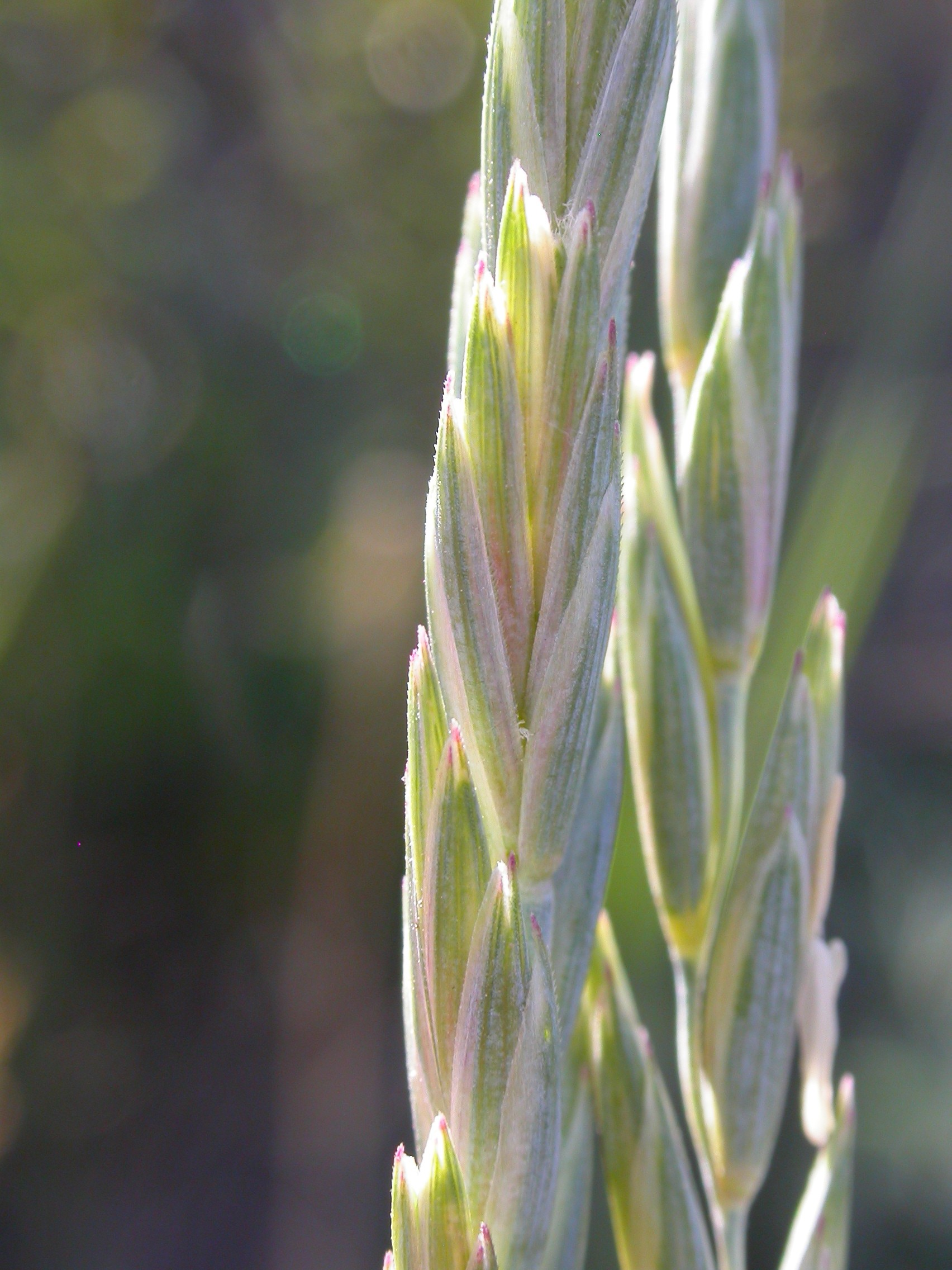

Conservation status
- Secure (NatureServe)

Scientific classification
- Kingdom: Plantae
- Clade: Tracheophytes
- Clade: Angiosperms
- Clade: Monocots
- Clade: Commelinids
- Order: Poales
- Family: Poaceae
- Subfamily: Pooideae
- Genus: Elymus
- Species: E. lanceolatus

Binomial name
- Elymus lanceolatus (Scribn. & J.G.Sm.) Gould

Synonyms
- Agropyron dasystachyum

= Elymus lanceolatus =

Species of grass

Elymus lanceolatus is a species of grass known by the common names thickspike wheatgrass and streamside wheatgrass. It is native to North America, where it is widespread and abundant in much of Canada and the western and central United States. There are two subspecies, subsp. lanceolatus occurring throughout the species' range and subsp. psammophilus occurring in the Great Lakes region.

Elymus lanceolatus subsp. lanceolatus is a perennial, rhizomatous grass. It has a moderate growth rate and is shade intolerant. It is available commercially.

== Description ==
This grass produces hollow, erect stems up to 1.3 metres (4.3 feet) tall. The grass grows from a dense network of roots and rhizomes thickly intertwined to form a sod. The leaves are up to 25 centimetres (9.8 inches) long and .5 cm (0.20 in) wide and are flat or slightly rolled at the edges. In dry, hot weather the leaves roll completely into cylindrical shapes. The inflorescence is a narrow, compact spike at the top of the stem, measuring up to 22 cm (8.7 in) long. Each spikelet may have 2 to 11 flowers.

Elymus lanceolatus is polymorphic, there are two subspecies: subsp. lanceolatus occurring throughout the species' range and subsp. psammophilus occurring in the Great Lakes region.

This species can hybridize with some other grass species, bluebunch wheatgrass (Pseudoroegneria spicata) and slender wheatgrass (Elymus trachycaulus).

== Ecology ==
This plant is native to semiarid regions. The plant grows in areas with 200-500 millimeters (8-20 inches) of annual precipitation. It is common and dominant in a number of habitat types in all stages of ecological succession. It can be found in forests, woodlands, sagebrush, shrubsteppe, desert, sandy lakeshores and sand dunes, and a wide variety of grassland and prairie ecosystems. It takes hold easily in disturbed areas such as roadsides. It is capable of growing in high altitude regions of the Rocky Mountains or at sea level near the Great Lakes in the United States. Though it rarely forms large monotypic stands, small pure stands of the species are common. It is highly drought-resistant and tolerant of wildfire and grazing pressure.

The bloom period for E. lanceolatus is mid-spring. The plant often reproduces by seed, but in some areas, particularly in sandy substrates, it reproduces vegetatively by sprouting from its rhizome. New plants sprout from a soil seed bank, the seeds surviving in the soil for 3 to 4 years on average.

E. lanceolatus is mycorrhizal.

== Uses ==
Elymus lanceolatus shows potential to be used for restoring grasslands. This can indirectly help human food consumption as E. lanceolatus may improve soil health. Soil health may be improved because it produces a sod due to its ability to form grass root networks and rhizomes. The term sod refers to grass which is held together by roots below soil. Plants may have a more difficult time forming rhizomes if there are neighboring roots nearby that would cause physical resistance. This plant’s growth is increased by removing other plants nearby and planting at a moderate density around 300-600 seeds/m^{2}.

Wheatgrass has also previously been shown to be beneficial for forage uses. This may be because it can be seeded with legumes in both warm and cool seasons. Elymus lanceolatus has specifically been used for animal foraging. Though E. lanceolatus does not produce a nut or berry product, it can be consumed by grazing animals. In the spring, it is a preferred food source for elk, horses, and cattle. It is additionally beneficial because it has a rapid vegetative spread rate even though its rate of spreading seeds is slow. Humans have not eaten E. lanceolatus because studies suggest that it may inedible for human consumption. However, it has a medium protein nutritive potential. Its protein levels are highest in the spring, at around 20%. This protein content decreases to about 4% as the plant matures. The amount of carbohydrates that can be digested (in animals) are about 45% in the growth period of E. lanceolatus. The USDA Plants Profile page suggests that E. lanceolatus is not palatable to humans.

This grass makes a good forage for livestock, particularly when it is young and succulent. This grass may also be used for foraging in the summer season even though many other grass species are past their optimal nutritive and productive period. Wildlife such as elk also consume it. It is valuable for revegetation efforts in disturbed spaces such as pipeline construction sites and is good for rangeland rehabilitation. It is also used in urban areas. Its ability to form thick sod makes it good for erosion control, and the sod is so dense that many weeds are unable to invade stands of it. A number of cultivars have been introduced, such as 'Bannock,' 'Critana,' 'Elbee,' 'Schwendimar,' 'Secar,' and 'Sodar'. The grass, including its cultivars, has been shown to be effective at inhibiting the spread of weeds such as Russian knapweed (Acroptilon repens) and diffuse knapweed (Centaurea diffusa).

Because the plant produces a dense mat of rhizomes, deep roots, and can form dense stands, it is suitable for erosion control.
