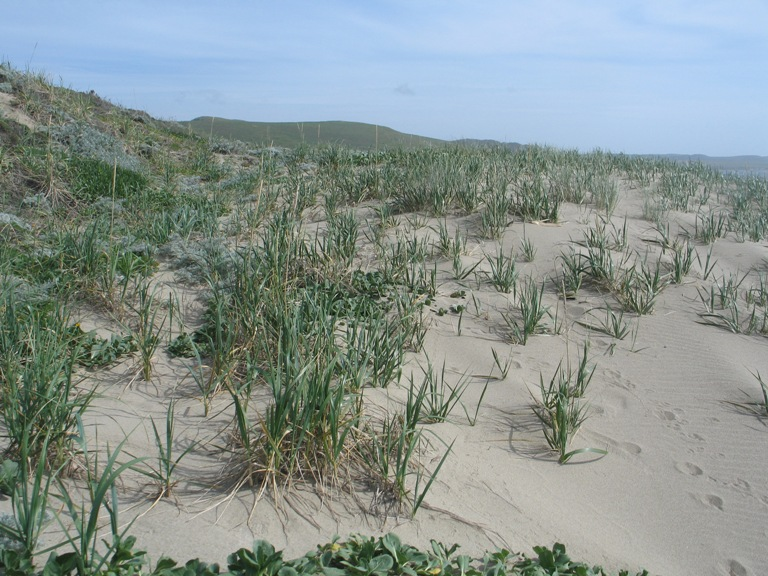
- subsp. mollis in California

Conservation status
- Secure (NatureServe)

Scientific classification
- Kingdom: Plantae
- Clade: Tracheophytes
- Clade: Angiosperms
- Clade: Monocots
- Clade: Commelinids
- Order: Poales
- Family: Poaceae
- Subfamily: Pooideae
- Genus: Leymus
- Species: L. mollis

Binomial name
- Leymus mollis (Trin.) Pilg.

Synonyms
- Elymus mollis

= Leymus mollis =

Species of grass

Leymus mollis is a species of grass known by the common names American dune grass, American dune wild-rye, sea lyme-grass, strand-wheat, and strand grass. Its Japanese name is hamaninniku. It is native to Asia, where it occurs in Japan, China, Korea, and Russia, and northern parts of North America, where it occurs across Canada and the northern United States, as well as Greenland. It can also be found in Iceland.

== Growth patterns ==
This is a rhizomatous perennial grass with erect stems growing up to 1.7 meters tall. The leaf blades can be nearly a meter long in ssp. mollis, and up to 1.5 centimeters wide. The flower spike is up to 34 centimeters long by 2 wide. Each spikelet may be up to 3.4 centimeters long and contain up to six florets. There are two subspecies. Subspecies villosissimus is mostly limited to arctic regions, and is mainly coastal. It is usually a smaller plant than ssp. mollis. The two subspecies are otherwise hard to tell apart, even when growing sympatrically. The most reliable character to use to distinguish them is the type of hairs on the glumes and lemmas; ssp. villosissimus has long, soft, sometimes shaggy hairs (villous), while ssp. mollis has fine, thin hairs (pilose), and generally fewer of them. There is no awn.

== Habitat ==
This grass usually grows in coastal habitat, especially on dunes. It can be an important part of dune ecology. The grass usually grows on the foredune and on embryo dunes, less often on the backdune. It is one of the first plants to establish in the process of ecological succession in the early stages of the development of a sand dune. In these loose dunes facing the ocean the plants tolerate salt spray, salty sand, little to no fresh water, unstable substrates, occasional inundation during storms, low nutrient levels, and abrasion by wind, water, and ice storms. Seedlings may become buried. This type of environment causes stress in a plant. The grass grows from a large rhizome that anchors it into shifting and unstable sands. When there are many plants on a dune, their rhizomes form a network that helps to stabilize it, preventing erosion. The network becomes "the skeleton of the foredune." This makes the grass a valuable species for landscape rehabilitation in native beach habitat.

== Other plants ==
Other plants that occur with the grass include Lathyrus japonicus, Achillea millefolium, Festuca rubra, Ammophila breviligulata, Rhus typhina, Rosa rugosa, and Arctanthemum arcticum. It also grows with mosses such as Pleurozium shreberi and Polytrichum spp. and lichens such as Cladina spp. It was observed to be one of the most common plants in the arctic nesting sites of the snow goose. It is thought that the geese prefer the overall ecosystem that hosts the grass, rather than favoring the grass itself.

== Genetic hybridization ==
Leymus mollis has been studied for possible usage in the science of wheat breeding. Wide hybridization of wheat and L. mollis has been conducted successfully since the 1960s to generate many hybrids. An important example of L. mollis hybridization with wheat occurred when the AD99 L. mollis line was hybridized with wheat. The AD99 was resistant to powdery mildew, and the resultant wheat hybrid yielded six lines that were also resistant to powdery mildew. This experiment can be used as a basis for L. mollis to be considered as a very useful genetic resource. By using Expressed Sequence Tags (ESTs) it was found that wheat has a complex and redundant genome. ESTs serve to identify transcribed parts of the genome. Through a comparative study it was found that L. mollis has some of these genes as well; because they are highly conserved. These genes are more prominent in L. mollis than wheat however, and are used for osmotic and drought stress tolerance. Due to their similarity though, they have the ability to be hybridized into wheat. Overall these ESTs help to provide proper tools for molecular markers to help identify possible introgression of genes into wheat, particularly in regards to osmotic stress tolerance.

Leymus mollis' relative success with wheat breeding can be demonstrated specifically by utilizing the Genetic In-Situ Hybridization (GISH) method. Comparative GISH showed that the genomes in the genus Leymus are fairly diverse. However, it was also found that chromosomes of species within this genus were able to undergo complete meiotic paring in hybridism with each other. Using the GISH technique, it was found that differences in sub-telomeric heterochromatin do not affect meiotic pairing. Because of this it can be understood that the differences between Leymus genus and Triticum (wheat) would not prevent successful hybridization. This conclusion results from the fact that Leymus is already able to overcome differences within its own genus in pairing.

== Adaptability ==
Leymus mollis is generally looked at for hybridization due to it being highly adaptable and robust. To determine this adaptable nature of L. mollis, its seedlings were studied in an environment in which there was low nutrient availability. In this environment, the seedlings were very tolerant of the low nutrients and were still able to sprout. Generally, low soil moisture is considered to be an important mortality factor, yet L. mollis seedlings were able to survive successfully. The period of drought that these seedlings were tested in was 5 successive days, and L. mollis had a survival rate of 93%. This adaptability of the plant is something that is not seen in wheat seedlings, which is why it is looked at for hybridization. Being a dune grass, L. mollis also has an extensive ability to survive salinity. The viability of these seeds in the salinity was found to be higher than fifty percent following submergence for seven days. This is translatable to L. mollis being able to grow in soil with high salt content. The surrounding soil may not be viable for traditional plants, however L. mollis still retains the ability to grow. This further demonstrates the wide adaptability of L. mollis.

As a result of strong anthropogenic pressures in today’s world, one response is to look at sustainable development of our vegetative environment. Biologists are continuously looking for new ways to combat these artificial pressures, and one of the species that has potential to be more closely looked at is Leymus mollis, an extremely adaptable plant species. Specific traits of L. mollis can be proven beneficial in the hybridization and domestication of this species or a hybrid species. These traits include the species’ ability to tolerate moderate burial intensity and sustain trampling, adapt to drought and water deficiency, resist many fungal diseases such as wheat stripe rust, contain high rhizome bud viability, and tolerate salt and various diseases.

Drought tolerance: The first environmental stress factor that L. mollis exhibits tolerance to is drought and water deficiency. This wild relative of wheat has defense mechanisms that express several stress-responsive genes that allow the species to tolerate drought and water deficiency. These genetic factors leading to the adaptability of L. mollis to water deficiencies can be beneficial in artificial selection and hybridization.

Burial tolerance: Although Leymus mollis adapts well to moderate and high drought intensities, it has shown to have even a greater tolerance for moderate burial intensity and sustain the trampling present in North American subarctic environments.

Fungal disease resistance: In addition to these tolerance factors, Leymus mollis is also resistant to many fungal diseases. One example of this tolerance is with wheat stripe rust, a plant infection caused by Puccinia striiformis. As one of the most widely distributed and destructive fungal diseases in the world, many wheat crops today need new effective resistance genes and development of new resistance germplasms. Multiple types of translocation wheat lines that possess resistance to multiple different races of stripe rust fungus have been found.

Rhizome bud viability: The strong rhizome bud viability of L. mollis also contributes to the species’ adaptability. Leymus mollis rhizomes have potential to spread and colonize a large distance from a source population due to their bud’s ability to survive in seawater during seawater submergence. Although L. mollis does not have as brittle of rhizomes as some species native to the same areas, such as Ammophilia arenaria, and therefore does not break into rhizome fragments as easily, many other rhizomes have a lower viability than L. mollis rhizomes.

Salt tolerance and disease resistance: The genes for salt tolerance and disease resistance are also naturally found in L. mollis. In addition, this species has large spikes, strong rhizomes, and experiences vigorous growth in environments ranging from Siberia to Canada and Iceland and the northern parts of Japan.

All of these traits of L. mollis have the potential to be beneficial for crop improvement and domestication of new plant species in response to anthropogenic pressures and the increased need for food production.

== Human uses ==
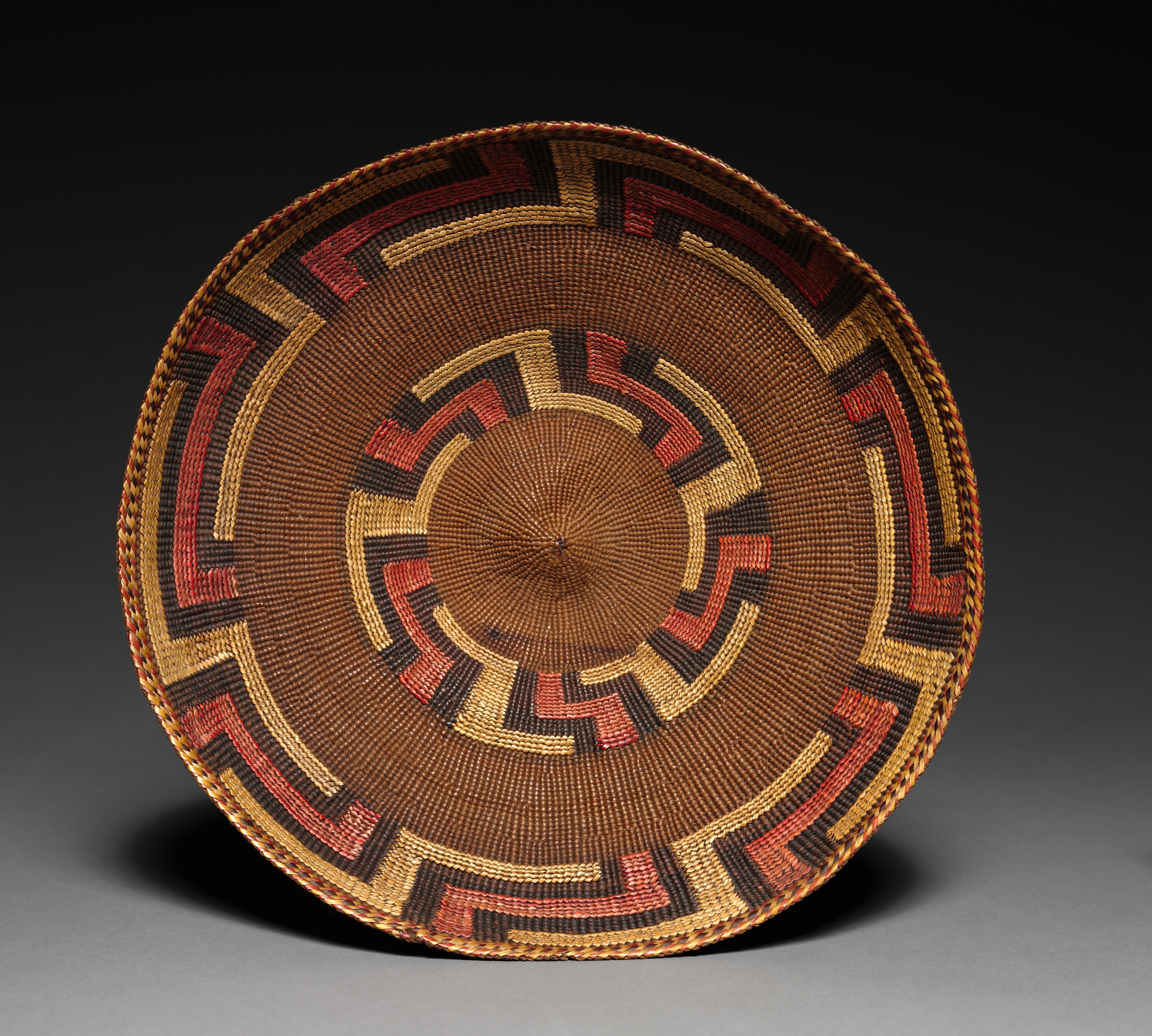
Tlingit twined basket tray, late 19th c., spruce root, American dunegrass, pigment, Cleveland Museum of Art

This grass has had a number of other uses. In addition to possible wheat breeding, the drought resistance of L. mollis is suggested to be used in restoration initiatives. The Makah, Nitinaht, and Quileute used bunches of the thick roots to rub the body during bathing. Yupik peoples use the leaves to make mats, baskets, bags, and ropes for hanging fish to dry. The Hesquiat weave the leaves into handles for sacks. The Kwakwaka'wakw make baskets and hats from the leaves and traditionally have used them to line the boxes in which they cooked lupine roots. The Nitinaht used the pointed leaves to sew and tie. The Haisla and Hanaksiala used the grass to line pits in which they prepared the oil of the eulachon fish. The Quinault placed salal fruits on a bed of the leaves to dry. Inuit in Canada have traditionally used Leymus mollis to treat stomach problems and to weave baskets. They used dried leaves to insulate their boots.

== Environmental concerns ==
While it is not a rare or threatened plant, its populations can be affected by processes that degrade and destroy its coastal habitat. Concerns include development, storm damage, and the impact of recreational activities. In some areas it has been displaced by introduced species of plants, such as Ammophila arenaria.

Cultivars available include 'Reeve' and 'Benson'. The latter was named for Benny Benson, the thirteen-year-old boy who designed the official flag of Alaska. It was bred for use in the revegetation of eroded dunes.
