= Leymus salina =

Conservation status
- Secure (NatureServe)

Scientific classification
- Kingdom: Plantae
- Clade: Tracheophytes
- Clade: Angiosperms
- Clade: Monocots
- Clade: Commelinids
- Order: Poales
- Family: Poaceae
- Subfamily: Pooideae
- Genus: Leymus
- Species: L. salina

Binomial name
- Leymus salina (M.E.Jones) Á.Löve

Synonyms
- Elymus salinus M.E.Jones; Leymus salinus orth. var.

Species of flowering plant

Leymus salina is a species of grass known as Salina wildrye, Salina Pass wildrye, and saline wildrye. It is native to the western United States and is named for its type locality: Salina Pass, Utah.

== Subspecies ==
There are three subspecies, including:

- Leymus salina subsp. salina
- Leymus salina subsp. salmonis – salmon wildrye

== Description ==
Salina wildrye is a perennial grass forming dense clumps of stems up to 1.4 meters in height. It sometimes has rhizomes. The leaves are mostly located around the bases of the stems. The inflorescence is a spike with spikelets mostly solitary or sometimes paired. Each spikelet contains up to 6 flowers.

== Habitat ==
This plant grows in a number of habitat types in the western United States. It is sometimes a dominant species in pinyon-juniper woodlands and Gambel oak woodlands. In Colorado it is often codominant with Wyoming big sagebrush, shadscale, and Gardner's saltbush.
