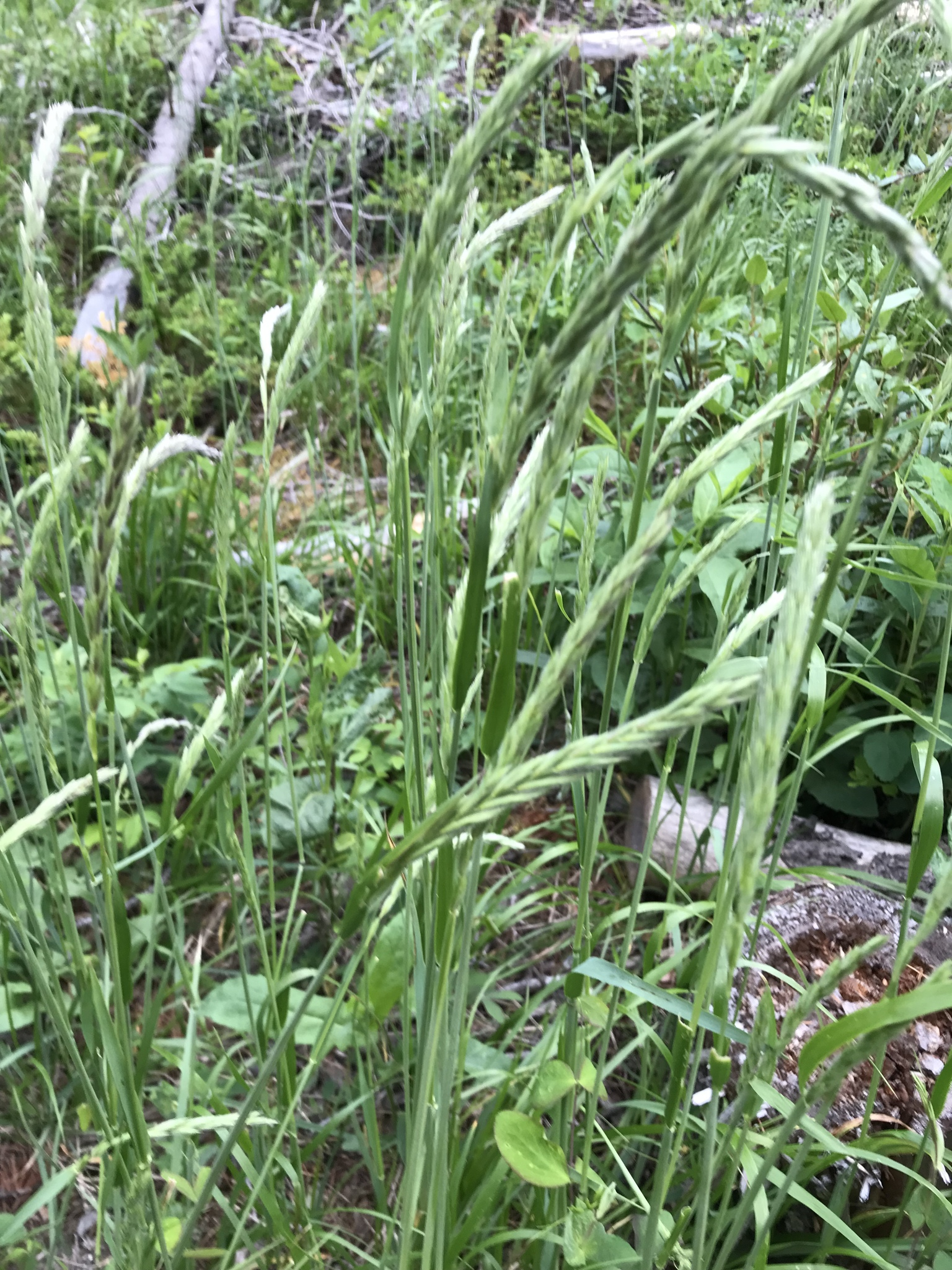

Conservation status
- Secure (NatureServe)

Scientific classification
- Kingdom: Plantae
- Clade: Tracheophytes
- Clade: Angiosperms
- Clade: Monocots
- Clade: Commelinids
- Order: Poales
- Family: Poaceae
- Subfamily: Pooideae
- Genus: Leymus
- Species: L. innovatus

Binomial name
- Leymus innovatus (Beal) Pilg.

Synonyms
- Elymus innovatus Beal

= Leymus innovatus =

Species of flowering plant

Leymus innovatus is a species of grass known as downy ryegrass, boreal wildrye, hairy wildrye, fuzzyspike wildrye, northern wildrye, and northwestern wildrye. It is native to northern North America from Alaska to eastern Canada and south to Colorado.

== Description ==
This perennial grass reproduces by seed or by spreading via its rhizomes. The stems grow up to about 80 to 105 centimeters tall. The inflorescence is a spike up to 16 centimeters long by 2 wide, with spikelets in pairs or threes.

== Ecology ==
This grass is often a dominant species in the understory of lodgepole pine forests. It commonly grows with other plant species such as russet buffaloberry (Shepherdia canadensis), bluejoint reedgrass (Calamagrostis canadensis), rough fescue (Festuca altaica), jack pine (Pinus banksiana), and white spruce (Picea glauca).
