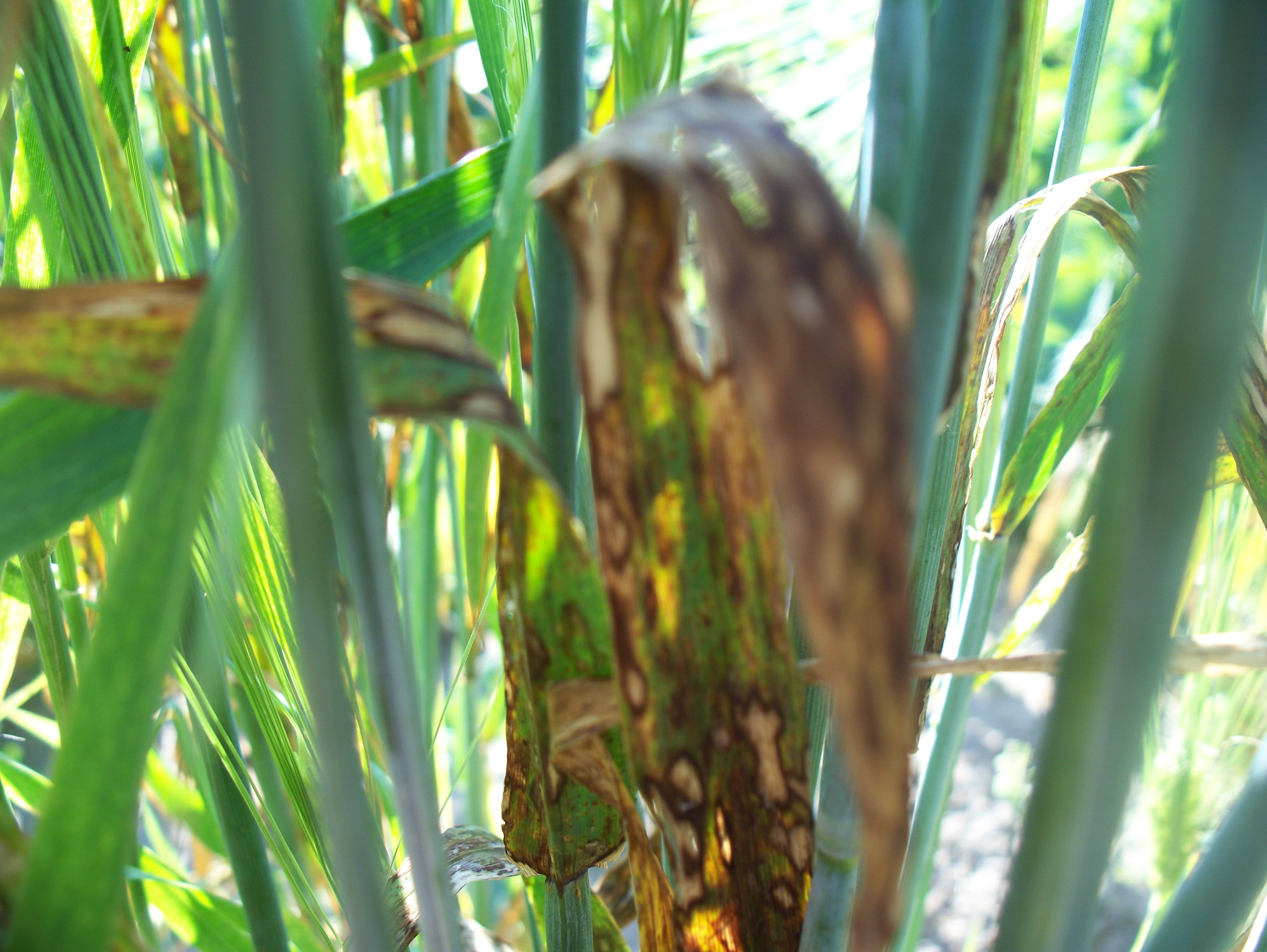
- Rhynchosporium secalis

Scientific classification
- Kingdom: Fungi
- Division: Ascomycota
- Class: Ascomycetes
- Family: incertae sedis
- Genus: Rhynchosporium; Heinsen ex A.B.Frank (1897)

Type species
- Rhynchosporium secalis (Oudem.) Davis (1922)

Species
- R. agropyri R. commune R. lolii R. orthosporum R. secalis

= Rhynchosporium =

Genus of fungi

Rhynchosporium is a genus of fungi that causes leaf scald disease on several graminaceous hosts. It includes five currently accepted species: R. secalis from rye and triticale, R. orthosporum from Dactylis glomerata, R. lolii from Lolium multiflorum and L. perenne, R. agropyri from Agropyron, and R. commune from Hordeum spp., Lolium multiflorum and Bromus diandrus. R. commune is one of the most destructive pathogens of barley worldwide, causing yield decreases of up to 40% and reduced grain quality.
