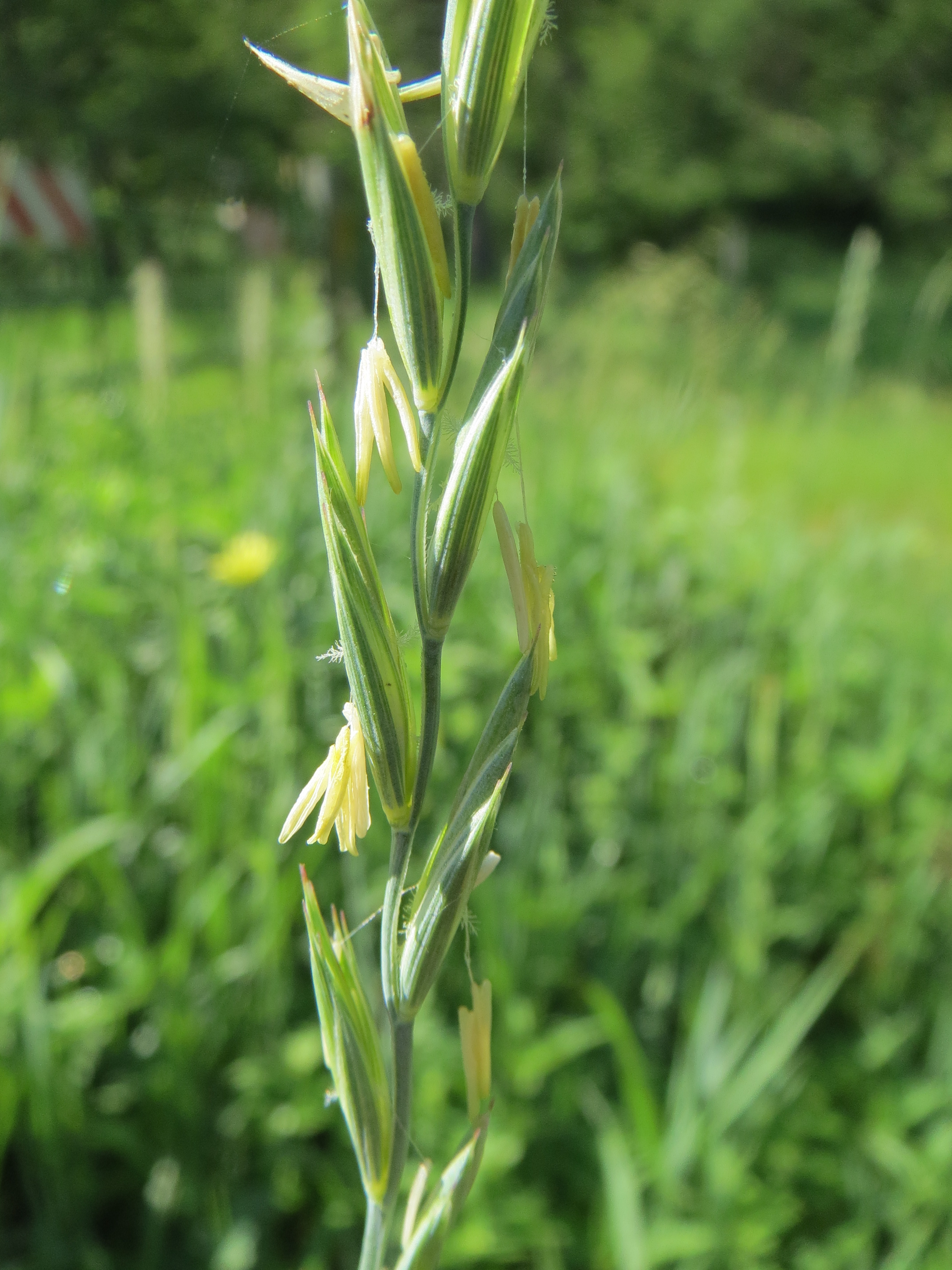

Scientific classification
- Kingdom: Plantae
- Clade: Tracheophytes
- Clade: Angiosperms
- Clade: Monocots
- Clade: Commelinids
- Order: Poales
- Family: Poaceae
- Subfamily: Pooideae
- Genus: Elymus
- Species: E. trachycaulus

Binomial name
- Elymus trachycaulus (Link) Gould ex Shinners

Synonyms
- Agropyron trachycaulum (Link) Malte ex H.F. Lewis

= Elymus trachycaulus =

Species of flowering plant

Elymus trachycaulus is a species of wild rye known by the common name slender wheatgrass. It is native to much of North America. It grows in widely varied habitats from northern Canada to Mexico, but is absent from most of the southeastern United States.

It is variable in appearance, but generally bears a very narrow, linear inflorescence of spikelets appressed against the stem. There are three subspecies, two very widespread and one which is limited to Greenland.

== Habitat ==
Slender wheatgrass (Elymus trachycaulus) grows in a wide variety of dry to mesic habitats. The species can also tolerate higher salinity in the soil, making it easier to grow in more diverse habitats. This cultivar can be established in a high-saline habitat over other grass cultivars. "Salt-tolerant, perennial forage crops capable of establishing on saline soils will provide protection against erosion, compete with weeds, utilize excess soil moisture, and provide forage for animals." Along with saline-stress tolerance, slender wheatgrass can also successfully grow in either shallow or deep soils. Generally individuals will persist between 5 and 10 years and produce a substantial seed count.
