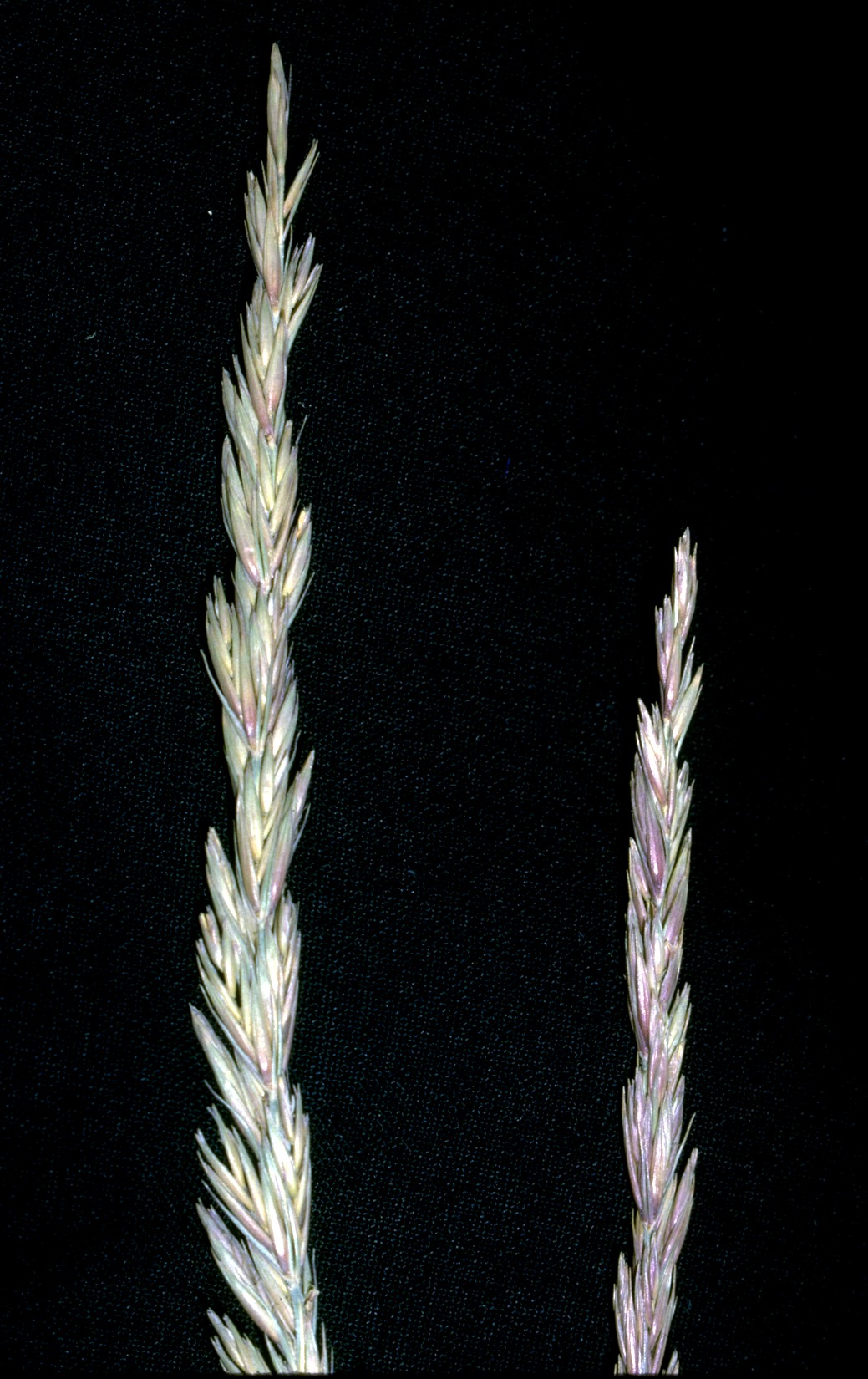

Scientific classification
- Kingdom: Plantae
- Clade: Tracheophytes
- Clade: Angiosperms
- Clade: Monocots
- Clade: Commelinids
- Order: Poales
- Family: Poaceae
- Subfamily: Pooideae
- Genus: Leymus
- Species: L. triticoides

Binomial name
- Leymus triticoides (Buckley) Pilg.

Synonyms
- Elymus triticoides Buckley

= Leymus triticoides =

Species of flowering plant

Leymus triticoides, with the common names creeping wild rye and beardless wild rye, is a species of wild rye. It is native to western North America from British Columbia to California and Texas.

== Habitat ==
Leymus triticoides often grows in moist habitat, sometimes with heavy and saline soils. It forms a solid root system which allows it to grow at water's edge and prevent the soil from eroding.

== Description ==
This rhizomatous, turf-forming perennial grass reaches 1.3 meters in maximum height. The stiff, slender green to blue-green leaves stand away from the stems at an obvious angle. The inflorescence is a narrow spike of flowers up to 20 centimeters long.

This is a good rangeland grass for grazing, and it is used to stabilize waterways because of its soil-retaining rhizome network.

Leymus triticoides is an important native plant in California chaparral and woodlands habitat restoration projects.

== See also ==
- Native grasses of California
