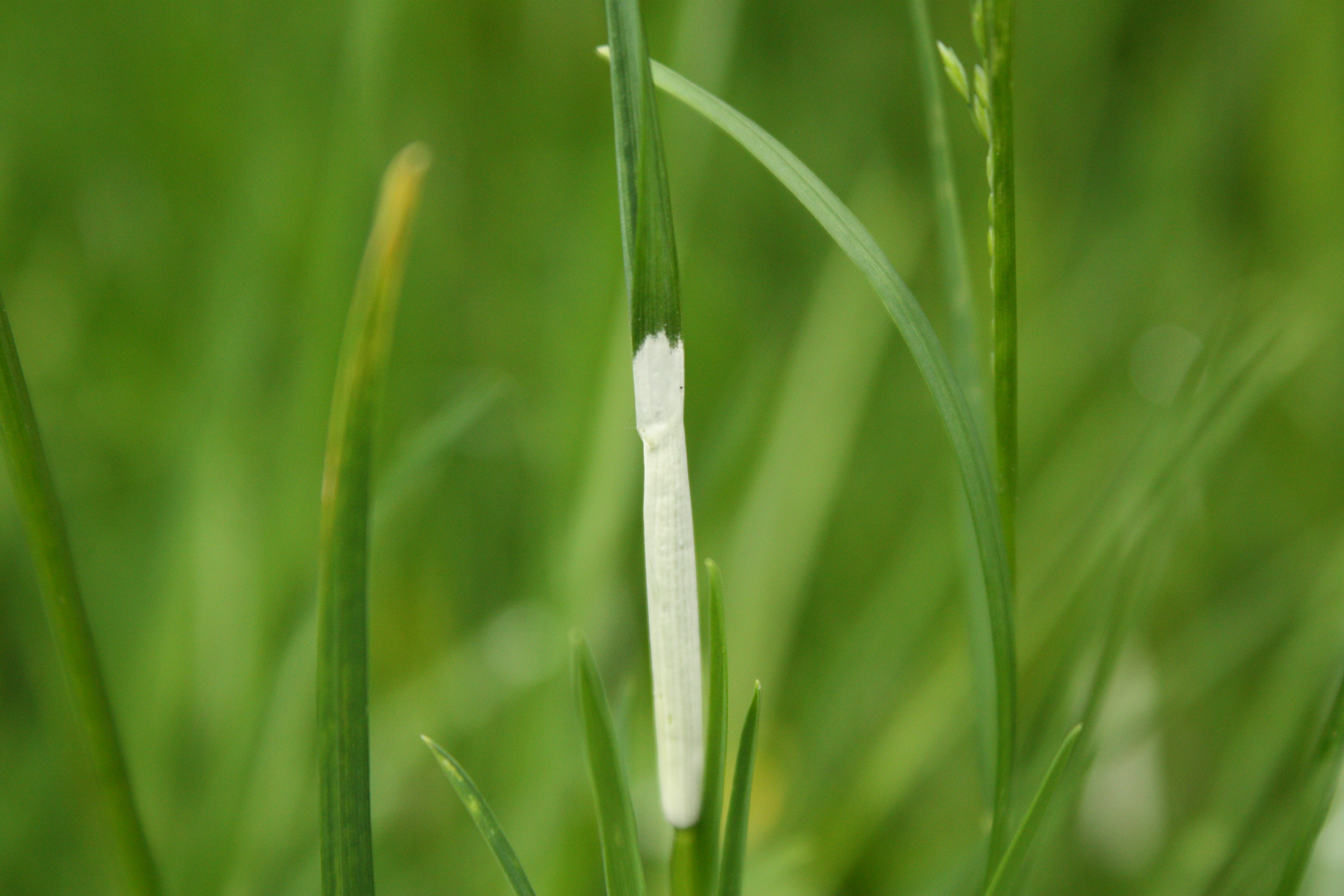
- "Choke disease": Epichloë typhina stroma on bluegrass

Scientific classification
- Kingdom: Fungi
- Division: Ascomycota
- Class: Sordariomycetes
- Order: Hypocreales
- Family: Clavicipitaceae
- Tribe: Balansiae
- Genus: Epichloë (Fr.) Tul. & C.Tul (1865)

Type species
- Epichloë typhina (Fr.) Tul. & C.Tul. (1865)

Diversity
- 37 species, see text

Synonyms
- Cordyceps subgen. Epichloë Fr. (1849); Hyperdermium J.F. White, R.F. Sullivan, Bills & Hywel-Jones (2000); Neotyphodium Glenn, C.W. Bacon & Hanlin (1996); Typhodium Link (1826) [1824]

= Epichloë =

Genus of fungi

Epichole, also known as Epichloë, is a genus of ascomycete fungi forming an endophytic symbiosis with grasses. Grass choke disease is a symptom in grasses induced by some Epichloë species, which form spore-bearing mats (stromata) on tillers and suppress the development of their host plant's inflorescence. For most of their life cycle however, Epichloë grow in the intercellular space of stems, leaves, inflorescences, and seeds of the grass plant without incurring symptoms of disease. In fact, they provide several benefits to their host, including the production of different herbivore-deterring alkaloids, increased stress resistance, and growth promotion.

Within the family Clavicipitaceae, Epichloë is embedded in a group of endophytic and plant pathogenic fungi, whose common ancestor probably derived from an animal pathogen. The genus includes both species with a sexually reproducing (teleomorphic) stage and asexual, anamorphic species. The latter were previously placed in the form genus Neotyphodium but included in Epichloë after molecular phylogenetics had shown asexual and sexual species to be intermingled in a single clade. Hybrid speciation has played an important role in the evolution of the genus.

Epichloë species are ecologically significant through their effects on host plants. Their presence has been shown to alter the composition of plant communities and food webs. Grass varieties, especially of tall fescue and ryegrass, with symbiotic Epichloë endophyte strains, are commercialised and used for pasture and turf.

== Taxonomy ==
Elias Fries, in 1849, first defined Epichloë as a subgenus of Cordyceps. As type species, he designated Cordyceps typhina, originally described by Christiaan Hendrik Persoon. The brothers Charles and Louis René Tulasne then raised the subgenus to genus rank in 1865. Epichloë typhina would remain the only species in the genus until the discovery of fungal grass endophytes causing livestock intoxications in the 1970s and 1980s, which stimulated the description of new species. Several species from Africa and Asia that develop stromata on grasses were split off as a separate genus Parepichloe in 1998.

Many Epichloë species have forms that reproduce sexually, and several purely asexual species are closely related to them. These anamorphs were long classified separately: Morgan-Jones and Gams (1982) collected them in a section (Albo-lanosa) of genus Acremonium. In a molecular phylogenetic study in 1996, Glenn and colleagues found the genus to be polyphyletic and proposed a new genus Neotyphodium for the anamorphic species related to Epichloë. A number of species continued to be described in both genera until Leuchtmann and colleagues (2014) included most of the form genus Neotyphodium in Epichloë. Phylogenetic studies had shown both genera to be intermingled, and the nomenclatural code required since 2011 that one single name be used for all stages of development of a fungal species. Only Neotyphodium starrii, of unclear status, and N. chilense, which is unrelated, were excluded from Epichloë.

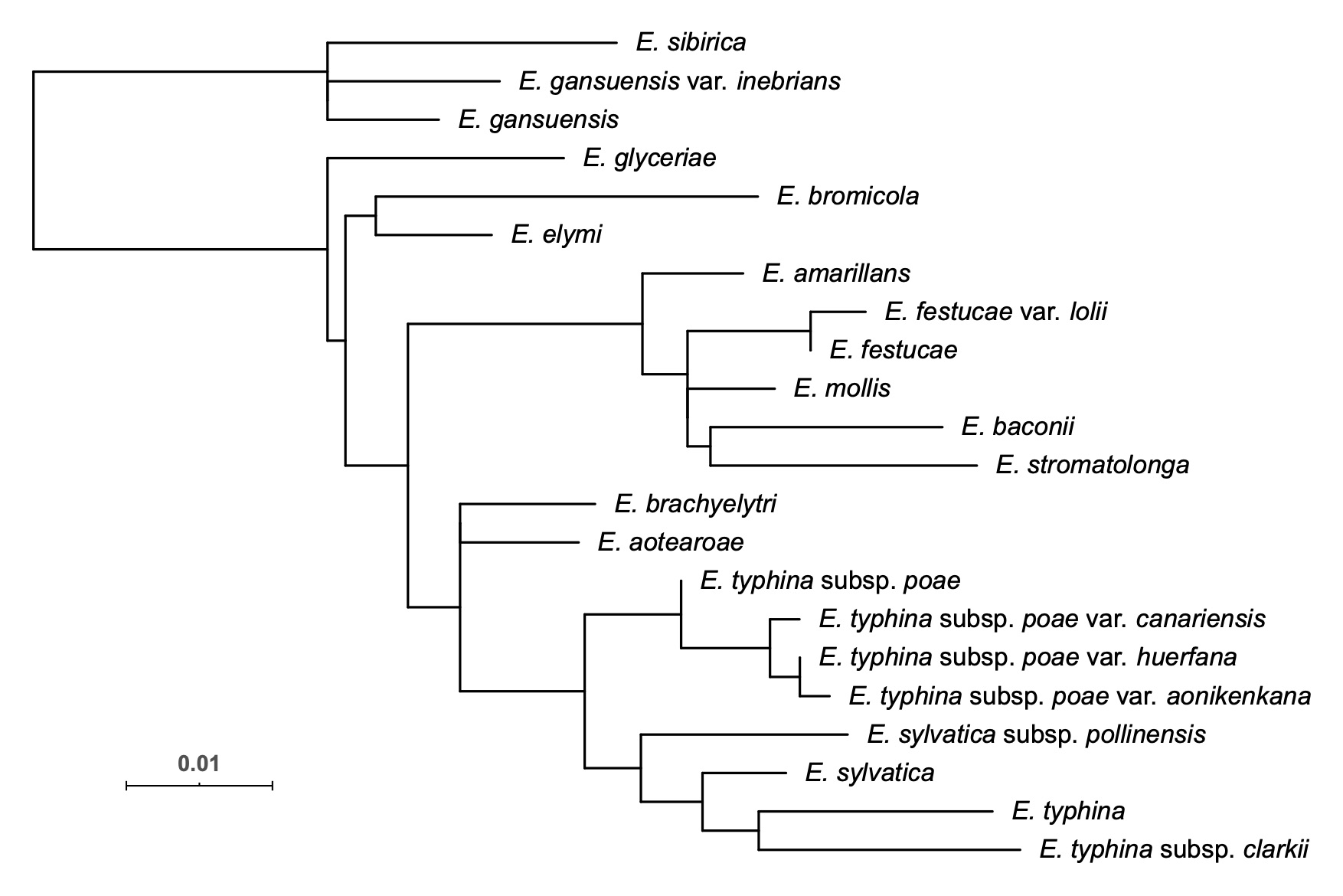
Phylogeny of the genus *Epichloë*. Clicking on a species in the phylogeny will load the appropriate wikipedia article.

== Species ==
As of 2024, there are 44 accepted species in the genus, with 1 subspecies and 5 varieties described. 20 species, 1 subspecies and 4 varieties are haploid. 24 species and 1 variety are hybrids (allopolyploids). Several taxa are only known as anamorphic (asexual) forms, most of which have previously been classified in Neotyphodium.

Haploid Taxa	Known Distribution	Sexual Reproduction	Vertical Transmission	Known Host Range	Reference to Species Description
Epichloë amarillans J.F. White	North America	Observed	Present	Agrostis hyemalis, Agrostis perennans, Calamagrostis canadensis, Elymus virginicus, Sphenopholis nitida, Sphenopholis obtusata, Sphenopholis × pallens, Ammophila breviligulata	White, James F. (1994). "Endophyte-host associations in grasses. XX. Structural and reproductive studies of Epichloë amarillans sp. nov. and comparisons to E. typhina". Mycologia. 86 (4): 571–580. doi:10.1080/00275514.1994.12026452. ISSN 0027-5514.
Epichloë aotearoae (C.D. Moon, C.O. Miles & Schardl) Leuchtm. & Schardl	New Zealand, Australia	Not observed	Present	Echinopogon ovatus	Moon, Christina D.; Miles, Christopher O.; Järlfors, Ulla; Schardl, Christopher L. (2002). "The evolutionary origins of three new Neotyphodium endophyte species from grasses indigenous to the Southern Hemisphere". Mycologia. 94 (4): 694–711. doi:10.1080/15572536.2003.11833197. ISSN 0027-5514. PMID 21156542. S2CID 12259278.
Epichloë baconii J.F. White	Europe	Observed	Absent	Agrostis capillaris, Agrostis stolonifera	White, James F. (1993). "Endophyte-host associations in grasses. XIX. A systematic study of some sympatric species of Epichloë in England". Mycologia. 85 (3): 444–455. doi:10.1080/00275514.1993.12026295. ISSN 0027-5514.
Epichloë brachyelytri Schardl & Leuchtm.	North America	Observed	Present	Brachyelytrum erectum	Schardl, Christopher L.; Leuchtmann, Adrian (1999). "Three new species of Epichloë symbiotic with North American grasses". Mycologia. 91 (1): 95–107. doi:10.1080/00275514.1999.12060996. ISSN 0027-5514.
Epichloë bromicola Leuchtm. & Schardl	Europe, Asia	Observed on Bromus erectus, Elymus repens and Elymus tsukushiensis	Present in Bromus benekenii, Bromus ramosus, Bromus tomentellus, Elymus repens, Elymus tsukushiensis, Hordelymus europaeus, Hordeum brevisubulatum, Leymus chinensis, Melica persica	Europe: Bromus benekenii, Bromus erectus, Bromus ramosus, Elymus repens, Hordelymus europaeus, Hordeum brevisubulatum. Asia: Bromus tomentellus, Leymus chinensis, Elymus tsukushiensis, Melica persica	Leuchtmann, Adrian; Schardl, Christopher L. (1998). "Mating compatibility and phylogenetic relationships among two new species of Epichloë and other congeneric European species". Mycological Research. 102 (10): 1169–1182. doi:10.1017/S0953756298006236. ISSN 0953-7562.
Epichloë calamagrostidis Leuchtm. & Schardl	Europe	Observerd	Absent	Calamagrostis villosa, Calamagrostis varia, Calamagrostis purpurea	Leuchtmann, Adrian; Schardl, Christopher L. (2022). "Genetic diversity of Epichloë endophytes associated with Brachypodium and Calamagrostis host grass genera including two new species". Journal of Fungi. 8 (10): 1886. doi: 10.3390/jof8101086
Epichloë elymi Schardl & Leuchtm.	North America	Observed	Present	Bromus kalmii, Elymus spp. (including Elymus hystrix)	Schardl, Christopher L.; Leuchtmann, Adrian (1999). "Three new species of Epichloë symbiotic with North American grasses". Mycologia. 91 (1): 95–107. doi:10.1080/00275514.1999.12060996. ISSN 0027-5514.
Epichloë festucae Leuchtm., Schardl & M.R. Siegel	Europe, Asia, North America	Observed	Present	Festuca spp., Koeleria spp., Schedonorus spp.	Leuchtmann, Adrian; Schardl, Christopher L.; Siegel, Malcolm R. (1994). "Sexual compatibility and taxonomy of a new species of Epichloë symbiotic with fine fescue grasses". Mycologia. 86 (6): 802–812. doi:10.1080/00275514.1994.12026487. ISSN 0027-5514.
Epichloë festucae var. lolii (Latch, M.J. Chr. & Samuels) C.W. Bacon & Schardl	Europe, Asia, North Africa, introduced in New Zealand, Australia and elsewhere	Not observed	Present	Lolium perenne subsp. perenne	Latch, G.C.M.; Christensen, M.J.; Samuels, G.J. (1984). "Five endophytes of Lolium and Festuca in New Zealand". Mycotaxon. 20 (2): 535–550. doi:10.5962/p.418797.
Epichloë ftanensis Leuchtm. & A.D. Treindl	Europe	Observed	Absent	Calamagrostis arundinacea	Leuchtmann, Adrian; Schardl, Christopher L. (2022). "Genetic diversity of Epichloë endophytes associated with Brachypodium and Calamagrostis host grass genera including two new species". Journal of Fungi. 8 (10): 1886. doi: 10.3390/jof8101086
Epichloë gansuensis (C.J. Li & Nan) Schardl	Asia	Not observed	Present	Achnatherum inebrians, Achnatherum sibiricum, Achnatherum pekinense	Li, C.J.; Nan, Z.B.; Paul, V.H.; Dapprich, P.D.; Liu, Y. (2004). "A new Neotyphodium species symbiotic with drunken horse grass (Achnatherum inebrians) in China". Mycotaxon. 90: 141–147.
Epichloë inebrians (C.D. Moon & Schardl) L. Chen & C.J. Li	Asia	Not observed	Present	Achnatherum inebrians	Moon, Christina D.; Guillaumin, Jean-Jacques; Ravel, Catherine; Li, Chunjie; Craven, Kelly D.; Schardl, Christopher L. (2007). "New Neotyphodium endophyte species from the grass tribes Stipeae and Meliceae". Mycologia. 99 (6): 895–905. doi:10.1080/15572536.2007.11832521. ISSN 0027-5514. PMID 18333513. S2CID 19953493.
Epichloë glyceriae Schardl & Leuchtm.	North America	Observed	Absent	Glyceria spp.	Schardl, Christopher L.; Leuchtmann, Adrian (1999). "Three new species of Epichloë symbiotic with North American grasses". Mycologia. 91 (1): 95–107. doi:10.1080/00275514.1999.12060996. ISSN 0027-5514.
Epichloë mollis (Morgan-Jones & W. Gams) Leuchtm. & Schardl	Europe	Observed	Present	Holcus mollis	Morgan-Jones, G.; Gams, W. (1982). "Notes on hyphomycetes. XLI. An endophyte of Festuca arundinacea and the anamorph of Epichloë typhina, new taxa in one of two new sections of Acremonium". Mycotaxon. 15: 311–318. doi:10.5962/p.417405. ISSN 0093-4666.
Epichloë scottii T. Thünen, Y. Becker, M.P. Cox & S. Ashrafi	Europe	Observed	Present	Melica uniflora	Thünen, Torsten; Becker, Yvonne; Cox, Murray P.; Ashrafi, Samad (2022). "Epichloë scottii sp. nov., a new endophyte isolated from Melica uniflora is the missing ancestor of Epichloë disjuncta". IMA Fungus. 13 (1): 2. doi:10.1186/s43008-022-00088-0. PMC 8812020. PMID 35109929.
Epichloë sibirica (X. Zhang & Y.B. Gao) Tadych	Asia	Not observed	Present	Achnatherum sibiricum	Zhang, Xin; Ren, An-Zhi; Wei, Yu-Kun; Lin, Feng; Li, Chuan; Liu, Zhi-Jian; Gao, Yu-Bao (2009). "Taxonomy, diversity and origins of symbiotic endophytes of Achnatherum sibiricum in the Inner Mongolia Steppe of China". FEMS Microbiology Letters. 301 (1): 12–20. doi:10.1111/j.1574-6968.2009.01789.x. ISSN 0378-1097. PMID 19863662.
Epichloë stromatolonga (Y.L. Ji, L.H. Zhan & Z.W. Wang) Leuchtm.	Asia	Not observed	Present	Calamagrostis epigejos	Ji, Yan-ling; Zhan, Li-hui; Kang, Yan; Sun, Xiang-hui; Yu, Han-shou; Wang, Zhi-wei (2009). "A new stromata-producing Neotyphodium species symbiotic with clonal grass Calamagrostis epigeios (L.) Roth. grown in China". Mycologia. 101 (2): 200–205. doi:10.3852/08-044. ISSN 0027-5514. PMID 19397192. S2CID 32237846.
Epichloë sylvatica Leuchtm. & Schardl	Europe, Asia	Observed	Present	Brachypodium sylvaticum, Hordelymus europaeus	Leuchtmann, Adrian; Schardl, Christopher L. (1998). "Mating compatibility and phylogenetic relationships among two new species of Epichloë and other congeneric European species". Mycological Research. 102 (10): 1169–1182. doi:10.1017/S0953756298006236. ISSN 0953-7562.
Epichloë sylvatica subsp. pollinensis Leuchtm. & M. Oberhofer	Europe	Observed	Present	Hordelymus europaeus	Leuchtmann, Adrian; Oberhofer, Martina (2013). "The Epichloë endophytes associated with the woodland grass Hordelymus europaeus including four new taxa". Mycologia. 105 (5): 1315–1324. doi:10.3852/12-400. ISSN 0027-5514. PMID 23921239. S2CID 21024362.
Epichloë typhina (Pers.) Brockm.	Europe, introduced in North America and elsewhere	Observed	Present in Puccinellia distans; absent in other hosts	Anthoxanthum odoratum, Brachypodium phoenicoides, Brachypodium pinnatum, Dactylis glomerata, Lolium perenne, Milium effusum, Phleum pratense, Poa trivialis, Poa silvicola, Puccinellia distans	Brockmüller, H. J. H (1863). "Beiträge zur Kryptogamen-Flora Mecklenburgs". Archiv der Freunde der Naturgeschichte in Mecklenburg. 17: 162–256.
Epichloë clarkii J.F. White	Europe	Observed	Absent	Holcus lanatus Holcus mollis	White, James F. (1993). "Endophyte-host associations in grasses. XIX. A systematic study of some sympatric species of Epichloë in England". Mycologia. 85 (3): 444–455. doi:10.1080/00275514.1993.12026295. ISSN 0027-5514.
Epichloë poae Tadych, K.V. Ambrose, F.C. Belanger & J.F. White	Europe, North America	Observed on Poa nemoralis and Poa pratensis	Present in Poa nemoralis, Poa secunda subsp. juncifolia; absent in Poa pratensis	Europe: Poa nemoralis, Poa pratensis. North America: Poa secunda subsp. juncifolia, Poa sylvestris	Tadych, Mariusz; Ambrose, Karen V.; Bergen, Marshall S.; Belanger, Faith C.; White, James F. (2012). "Taxonomic placement of Epichloë poae sp. nov. and horizontal dissemination to seedlings via conidia". Fungal Diversity. 54 (1): 117–131. doi:10.1007/s13225-012-0170-0. ISSN 1560-2745. S2CID 17813728.
Epichloë poae var. aonikenkana Iannone & Schardl	Argentina (Santa Cruz)	Not observed	Present	Bromus setifolius	Mc Cargo, Patricia D.; Iannone, Leopoldo J.; Vignale, María Victoria; Schardl, Christopher L.; Rossi, María Susana (2017). "Species diversity of Epichloë symbiotic with two grasses from southern Argentinean Patagonia". Mycologia. 106 (2): 339–352. doi:10.3852/106.2.339. hdl:11336/37491. ISSN 0027-5514. PMID 24782501. S2CID 44547876.
Epichloë poae var. canariensis (C.D. Moon, B. Scott, & M.J. Chr.) Leuchtm.	Canary Islands	Not observed	Present	Lolium edwardii	Moon, Christina D.; Scott, Barry; Schardl, Christopher L.; Christensen, Michael J. (2000). "The evolutionary origins of Epichloë endophytes from annual ryegrasses". Mycologia. 92 (6): 1103–1118. doi:10.1080/00275514.2000.12061258. ISSN 0027-5514. S2CID 218589443.
Epichloë poae var. huerfana (J.F. White, G.T. Cole & Morgan-Jones) Tadych & Leuchtm.	North America	Not observed	Present	Festuca arizonica	Glenn, Anthony E.; Bacon, Charles W.; Price, Robert; Hanlin, Richard T. (1996). "Molecular phylogeny of Acremonium and its taxonomic implications". Mycologia. 88 (3): 369–383. doi:10.1080/00275514.1996.12026664. ISSN 0027-5514.

Hybrid Taxa	Progenitor Species	Known Distribution	Sexual Reproduction	Vertical Transmission	Known Host Range	Reference to Species Description
Epichloë alsodes T. Shymanovich, C.A. Young, N.D. Charlton & S.H. Faeth	Epichloë amarillans × Epichloë typhina subsp. poae	North America	Not observed	Present	Poa alsodes	Shymanovich, Tatsiana; Charlton, Nikki D.; Musso, Ashleigh M.; Scheerer, Jonathan; Cech, Nadja B.; Faeth, Stanley H.; Young, Carolyn A. (2017). "Interspecific and intraspecific hybrid Epichloë species symbiotic with the North American native grass Poa alsodes" (PDF). Mycologia. 109 (3): 459–474. doi:10.1080/00275514.2017.1340779. ISSN 0027-5514. PMID 28723242. S2CID 25290203.
Epichloë australiensis (C.D. Moon & Schardl) Leuchtm. & Schardl	Epichloë festucae × Epichloë typhina complex (from Poa pratensis)	Australia	Not observed	Present	Echinopogon ovatus	Moon, Christina D.; Miles, Christopher O.; Järlfors, Ulla; Schardl, Christopher L. (2017). "The evolutionary origins of three new Neotyphodium endophyte species from grasses indigenous to the Southern Hemisphere". Mycologia. 94 (4): 694–711. doi:10.1080/15572536.2003.11833197. ISSN 0027-5514. PMID 21156542. S2CID 12259278.
Epichloë cabralii Iannone, M.S. Rossi & Schardl	Epichloë amarillans × Epichloë typhina complex (from Poa nemoralis)	Argentina (Santa Cruz, Tierra del Fuego)	Not observed	Present	Phleum alpinum	Mc Cargo, Patricia D.; Iannone, Leopoldo J.; Vignale, María Victoria; Schardl, Christopher L.; Rossi, María Susana (2017). "Species diversity of Epichloë symbiotic with two grasses from southern Argentinean Patagonia". Mycologia. 106 (2): 339–352. doi:10.3852/106.2.339. hdl:11336/37491. ISSN 0027-5514. PMID 24782501. S2CID 44547876.
Epichloë canadensis N.D. Charlton & C.A. Young	Epichloë amarillans × Epichloë elymi	North America	Not observed	Present	Elymus canadensis	Charlton, N. D.; Craven, K. D.; Mittal, S.; Hopkins, A. A.; Young, C. A. (2012). "Epichloë canadensis, a new interspecific epichloid hybrid symbiotic with Canada wildrye (Elymus canadensis)". Mycologia. 104 (5): 1187–1199. doi:10.3852/11-403. ISSN 0027-5514. PMID 22675049. S2CID 43674700.
Epichloë chisosa (J.F. White & Morgan-Jones) Schardl	Epichloë amarillans × Epichloë bromicola × Epichloë typhina complex (from Poa pratensis)	North America	Not observed	Present	Achnatherum eminens	Glenn, Anthony E.; Bacon, Charles W.; Price, Robert; Hanlin, Richard T. (2018). "Molecular phylogeny of Acremonium and its taxonomic implications". Mycologia. 88 (3): 369–383. doi:10.1080/00275514.1996.12026664. ISSN 0027-5514.
Epichloë coenophiala (Morgan-Jones & W. Gams) C.W. Bacon & Schardl	Epichloë baconii (Lolium associated clade) × Epichloë festucae × Epichloë typhina complex (from Poa nemoralis)	Europe, North Africa, introduced in North America and elsewhere	Not observed	Present	Schedonorus arundinaceus [synonyms: Festuca arundinacea, Lolium arundinaceum]	Morgan-Jones, G.; Gams, W. (1982). "Notes on hyphomycetes. XLI. An endophyte of Festuca arundinacea and the anamorph of Epichloë typhina, new taxa in one of two new sections of Acremonium". Mycotaxon. 15: 311–318. doi:10.5962/p.417405. ISSN 0093-4666.
Epichloë danica Leuchtm. & M. Oberhofer	Epichloë bromicola × Epichloë sylvatica	Europe	Not observed	Present	Hordelymus europaeus	Leuchtmann, Adrian; Oberhofer, Martina (2017). "The Epichloë endophytes associated with the woodland grass Hordelymus europaeus including four new taxa". Mycologia. 105 (5): 1315–1324. doi:10.3852/12-400. ISSN 0027-5514. PMID 23921239. S2CID 21024362.
Epichloë disjuncta Leuchtm. & M. Oberhofer	Epichloë scottii × Epichloë typhina complex	Europe	Not observed	Present	Hordelymus europaeus	Leuchtmann, Adrian; Oberhofer, Martina (2017). "The Epichloë endophytes associated with the woodland grass Hordelymus europaeus including four new taxa". Mycologia. 105 (5): 1315–1324. doi:10.3852/12-400. ISSN 0027-5514. PMID 23921239. S2CID 21024362.
Epichloë funkii (K.D. Craven & Schardl) J.F. White	Epichloë elymi × Epichloë festucae	North America	Not observed	Present	Achnatherum robustum	Moon, Christina D.; Guillaumin, Jean-Jacques; Ravel, Catherine; Li, Chunjie; Craven, Kelly D.; Schardl, Christopher L. (2017). "New Neotyphodium endophyte species from the grass tribes Stipeae and Meliceae". Mycologia. 99 (6): 895–905. doi:10.1080/15572536.2007.11832521. ISSN 0027-5514. PMID 18333513. S2CID 19953493.
Epichloë guerinii (Guillaumin, Ravel & C.D. Moon) Leuchtm. & Schardl	Epichloë gansuensis × Epichloë typhina complex	Europe	Not observed	Present	Melica ciliata, Melica transsilvanica	Moon, Christina D.; Guillaumin, Jean-Jacques; Ravel, Catherine; Li, Chunjie; Craven, Kelly D.; Schardl, Christopher L. (2017). "New Neotyphodium endophyte species from the grass tribes Stipeae and Meliceae". Mycologia. 99 (6): 895–905. doi:10.1080/15572536.2007.11832521. ISSN 0027-5514. PMID 18333513. S2CID 19953493.
Epichloë hordelymi Leuchtm. & M. Oberhofer	Epichloë bromicola × Epichloë typhina complex	Europe	Not observed	Present	Hordelymus europaeus	Leuchtmann, Adrian; Oberhofer, Martina (2017). "The Epichloë endophytes associated with the woodland grass Hordelymus europaeus including four new taxa". Mycologia. 105 (5): 1315–1324. doi:10.3852/12-400. ISSN 0027-5514. PMID 23921239. S2CID 21024362.
Epichloë hybrida M.P. Cox & M.A. Campbell	Epichloë festucae var. lolii × Epichloë typhina	Europe	Not observed	Present	Lolium perenne	Campbell, Matthew A.; Tapper, Brian A.; Simpson, Wayne R.; Johnson, Richard D.; Mace, Wade; Ram, Arvina; Lukito, Yonathan; Dupont, Pierre-Yves; Johnson, Linda J.; Scott, D. Barry; Ganley, Austen R. D.; Cox, Murray P. (2017). "Epichloë hybrida, sp. nov., an emerging model system for investigating fungal allopolyploidy". Mycologia. 109 (5): 1–15. doi:10.1080/00275514.2017.1406174. ISSN 0027-5514. PMID 29370579.
Epichloë liyangensis Z.W. Wang, Y. Kang & H. Miao	Epichloë bromicola × Epichloë typhina complex (from Poa nemoralis)	Asia	Observed	Present	Poa pratensis subsp. pratensis	Yan, Kang; Yanling, Ji; Kunran, Zhu; Hui, Wang; Huimin, Miao; Zhiwei, Wang (2017). "A new Epichloë species with interspecific hybrid origins from Poa pratensis ssp. pratensis in Liyang, China". Mycologia. 103 (6): 1341–1350. doi:10.3852/10-352. ISSN 0027-5514. PMID 21659456. S2CID 22672333.
Epichloë melicicola (C.D. Moon & Schardl) Schardl	Epichloë aotearoae × Epichloë festucae	South Africa	Not observed	Present	Melica racemosa, Melica decumbens	Moon, Christina D.; Miles, Christopher O.; Järlfors, Ulla; Schardl, Christopher L. (2017). "The evolutionary origins of three new Neotyphodium endophyte species from grasses indigenous to the Southern Hemisphere". Mycologia. 94 (4): 694–711. doi:10.1080/15572536.2003.11833197. ISSN 0027-5514. PMID 21156542. S2CID 12259278.
Epichloë novae-zelandiae Leuchtm. & A.V. Stewart	Epichloë amarillans × Epichloë bromicola × Epichloë typhina subsp. poae	New Zealand	Not observed	Present	Poa matthewsii	Leuchtmann, Adrian; Young, Carolyn A.; Stewart, Alan V.; Simpson, Wayne R.; Hume, David E.; Scott, Barry (2019). "Epichloë novae-zelandiae, a new endophyte from the endemic New Zealand grass Poa matthewsii". New Zealand Journal of Botany. 57 (4): 271–288. Bibcode:2019NZJB...57..271L. doi:10.1080/0028825X.2019.1651344. ISSN 0028-825X. S2CID 202012350.
Epichloë occultans (C.D. Moon, B. Scott & M.J. Chr.) Schardl	Epichloë baconii (Lolium associated clade) × Epichloë bromicola	Europe, North Africa, introduced in New Zealand and elsewhere	Not observed	Present	Lolium multiflorum, Lolium rigidum u.a.	Moon, Christina D.; Scott, Barry; Schardl, Christopher L.; Christensen, Michael J. (2019). "The evolutionary origins of Epichloë endophytes from annual ryegrasses". Mycologia. 92 (6): 1103–1118. doi:10.1080/00275514.2000.12061258. ISSN 0027-5514. S2CID 218589443.
Epichloë pampeana (Iannone & Cabral) Iannone & Schardl	Epichloë festucae × Epichloë typhina complex (from Poa nemoralis)	South America	Not observed	Present	Bromus auleticus	Iannone, Leopoldo Javier; Cabral, Daniel; Schardl, Christopher Lewis; Rossi, María Susana (2017). "Phylogenetic divergence, morphological and physiological differences distinguish a new Neotyphodium endophyte species in the grass Bromus auleticus from South America". Mycologia. 101 (3): 340–351. doi:10.3852/08-156. ISSN 0027-5514. PMID 19537207. S2CID 24799520.
Epichloë schardlii (Ghimire, Rudgers & K.D. Craven) Leuchtm.	Epichloë typhina complex (subsp. poae × subsp. poae)	North America	Not observed	Present	Cinna arundinacea	Ghimire, Sita R.; Rudgers, Jennifer A.; Charlton, Nikki D.; Young, Carolyn; Craven, Kelly D. (2017). "Prevalence of an intraspecific Neotyphodium hybrid in natural populations of stout wood reed (Cinna arundinacea L.) from eastern North America". Mycologia. 103 (1): 75–84. doi:10.3852/10-154. ISSN 0027-5514. PMID 20943524. S2CID 13556418.
Epichloë schardlii var. pennsylvanica T. Shymanovich, C.A. Young, N.D. Charlton & S.H. Faeth	Epichloë typhina complex (subsp. poae × subsp. poae)	North America	Not observed	Present	Poa alsodes	Shymanovich, Tatsiana; Charlton, Nikki D.; Musso, Ashleigh M.; Scheerer, Jonathan; Cech, Nadja B.; Faeth, Stanley H.; Young, Carolyn A. (2017). "Interspecific and intraspecific hybrid Epichloë species symbiotic with the North American native grass Poa alsodes" (PDF). Mycologia. 109 (3): 459–474. doi:10.1080/00275514.2017.1340779. ISSN 0027-5514. PMID 28723242. S2CID 25290203.
Epichloë siegelii (K.D. Craven, Leuchtm. & Schardl) Leuchtm. & Schardl	Epichloë bromicola × Epichloë festucae	Europe	Not observed	Present	Schedonorus pratensis (synonyms: Festuca pratensis, Lolium pratense)	Craven, K.D.; Blankenship, J.D.; Leuchtmann, A.; Hinight, K.; Schardl, C.L. (2001). "Hybrid fungal endophytes symbiotic with the grass Lolium pratense". Sydowia. 53: 44–73.
Epichloë sinensis P. Tian, C.J. Li & Z.B. Nan	Epichloë sibirica × Epichloë typhina subsp. poae	Asia (Northwest China)	Not observed	Present	Festuca sinensis	Tian, Pei; Xu, Wenbo; Li, Chunjie; Song, Hui; Wang, Meining; Schardl, Christopher L.; Nan, Zhibiao (2020). "Phylogenetic relationship and taxonomy of a hybrid Epichloë species symbiotic with Festuca sinensis". Mycological Progress. 19 (10): 1069–1081. Bibcode:2020MycPr..19.1069T. doi:10.1007/s11557-020-01618-z. S2CID 225161777.
Epichloë sinica (Z.W. Wang, Y.L. Ji & Y. Kang) Leuchtm.	Epichloë bromicola × Epichloë typhina complex	Asia	Not observed	Present	Roegneria spp.	Yan, Kang; Yanling, Ji; Xianghui, Sun; Lihui, Zhan; Wei, Li; Hanshou, Yu; Zhiwei, Wang (2017). "Taxonomy of Neotyphodium endophytes of Chinese native Roegneria plants". Mycologia. 101 (2): 211–219. doi:10.3852/08-018. ISSN 0027-5514. PMID 19397194. S2CID 6307330.
Epichloë sinofestucae (Y.G. Chen, Y.L. Ji & Z.W. Wang) Leuchtm.	Epichloë bromicola × Epichloë typhina complex	Asia	Not observed	Present	Festuca parvigluma	Chen, Yong-gan; Ji, Yan-ling; Yu, Han-shou; Wang, Zhi-wei (2017). "A new Neotyphodium species from Festuca parvigluma Steud. grown in China". Mycologia. 101 (5): 681–685. doi:10.3852/08-181. ISSN 0027-5514. PMID 19750947. S2CID 27915317.
Epichloë tembladerae (Cabral & J.F. White) Iannone & Schardl	Epichloë festucae × Epichloë typhina complex (from Poa nemoralis)	North America	Not observed	Present	North America: Festuca arizonica. South America: Bromus auleticus, Bromus setifolius, Festuca argentina, Festuca hieronymi, Festuca magellanica, Festuca superba, Melica stuckertii, Phleum alpinum, Phleum commutatum, Poa huecu, Poa rigidifolia	Cabral, Daniel; Cafaro, Matías J.; Saidman, B.; Lugo, M.; Reddy, Ponaka V.; White, James F. (2019). "Evidence supporting the occurrence of a new species of endophyte in some South American grasses". Mycologia. 91 (2): 315–325. doi:10.1080/00275514.1999.12061021. ISSN 0027-5514.
Epichloë uncinata (W. Gams, Petrini & D. Schmidt) Leuchtm. & Schardl	Epichloë bromicola × Epichloë typhina complex	Europe	Not observed	Present	Schedonorus pratensis (synonyms: Festuca pratensis, Lolium pratense)	Gams, W.; Petrini, O. J.; Schmidt, D. (1990). "Acremonium uncinatum, a new endophyte in Festuca pratensis". Mycotaxon. 37: 67–71. doi:10.5962/p.416817.A1:G25

== Life cycle and growth ==
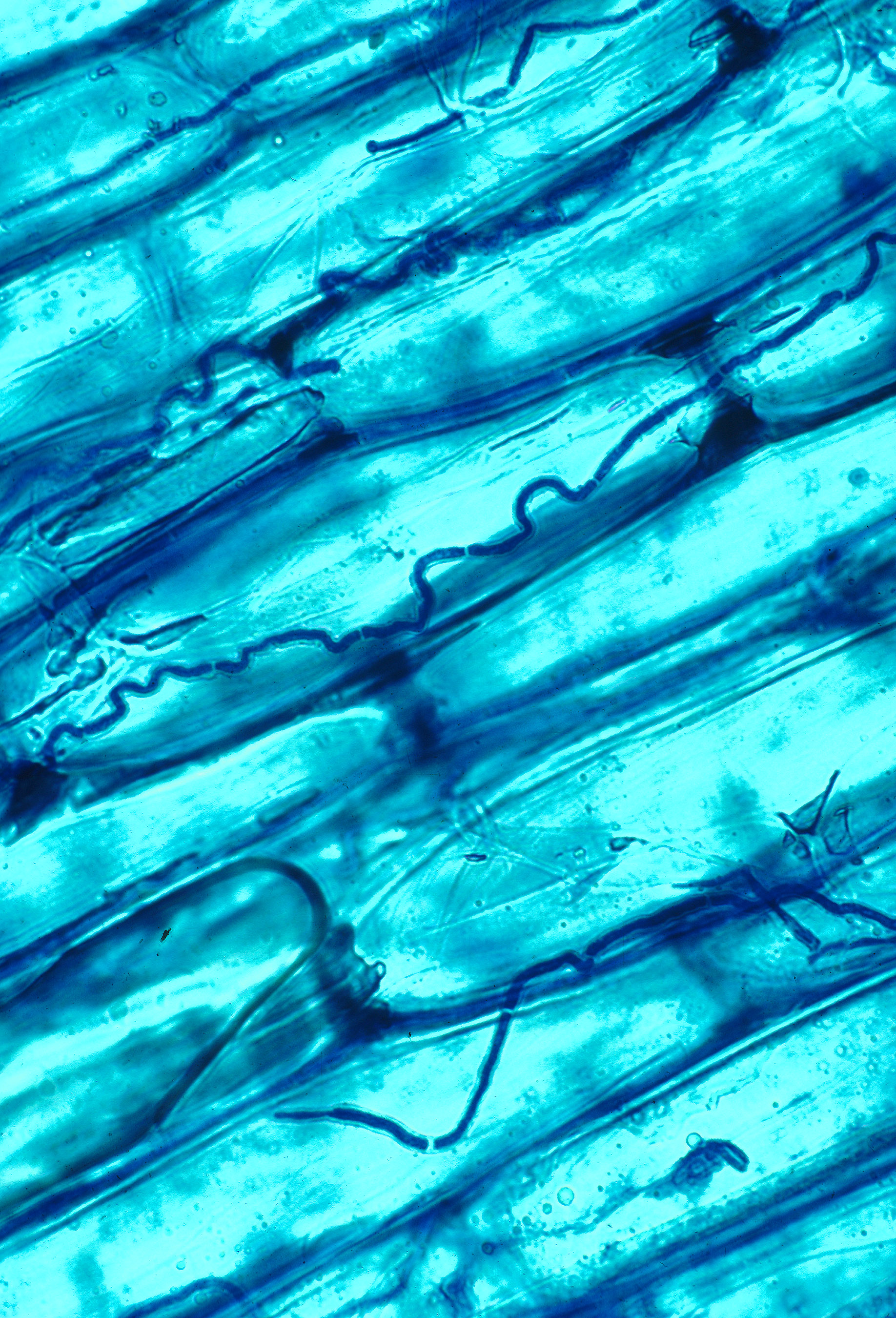
Epichloë coenophiala hyphae between tall fescue leaf cells

Epichloë species are specialized to form and maintain systemic, constitutive (long-term) symbioses with plants, often with limited or no disease incurred on the host. The best-studied of these symbionts are associated with the grasses and sedges, in which they infect the leaves and other aerial tissues by growing between the plant cells (endophytic growth) or on the surface above or beneath the cuticle (epiphytic growth). An individual infected plant will generally bear only a single genetic individual clavicipitaceous symbiont, so the plant-fungus system constitutes a genetic unit called a symbiotum (pl. symbiota).

Symptoms and signs of the fungal infection, if manifested at all, only occur on a specific tissue or site of the host tiller, where the fungal stroma or sclerotium emerges. The stroma (pl. stromata) is a mycelial cushion that gives rise first to asexual spores (conidia), then to the sexual fruiting bodies (ascocarps; perithecia). Sclerotia are hard resting structures that later (after incubation on the ground) germinate to form stipate stromata. Depending on the fungus species, the host tissues on which stromata or sclerotia are produced may be young inflorescences and surrounding leaves, individual florets, nodes, or small segments of the leaves. Young stromata are hyaline (colorless), and as they mature they turn dark gray, black, or yellow-orange. Mature stromata eject meiotically derived spores (ascospores), which are ejected into the atmosphere and initiate new plant infections (horizontal transmission). In some cases no stroma or sclerotium is produced, but the fungus infects seeds produced by the infected plant, and is thereby transmitted vertically to the next host generation. Most Epichloë species, and all asexual species, can vertically transmit.

The taxonomic dichotomy is especially interesting in this group of symbionts, because vegetative propagation of fungal mycelium occurs by vertical transmission, i.e., fungal growth into newly developing host tillers (=individual grass plants). Importantly, many Epichloë species infect new grass plants solely by growing into the seeds of their grass hosts, and infecting the growing seedling. Manifestation of the sexual state — which only occurs in Epichloë species — causes "choke disease", a condition in which grass inflorescences are engulfed by rapid fungal outgrowth forming a stroma. The fungal stroma suppresses host seed production and culminates in the ejection of meiospores (ascospores) that mediate horizontal (contagious) transmission of the fungus to new plants. So, the two transmission modes exclude each other, although in many grass-Epichloë symbiota the fungus actually displays both transmission modes simultaneously, by choking some tillers and transmitting in seeds produced by unchoked tillers.

While being obligate symbionts in nature, most epichloae are readily culturable in the laboratory on culture media such as potato dextrose agar or a minimal salts broth supplemented with thiamine, sugars or sugar alcohols, and organic nitrogen or ammonium.

Epichloë species are commonly spread by flies of the genus Botanophila. The flies lay their eggs in the growing fungal tissues and the larvae feed on them.

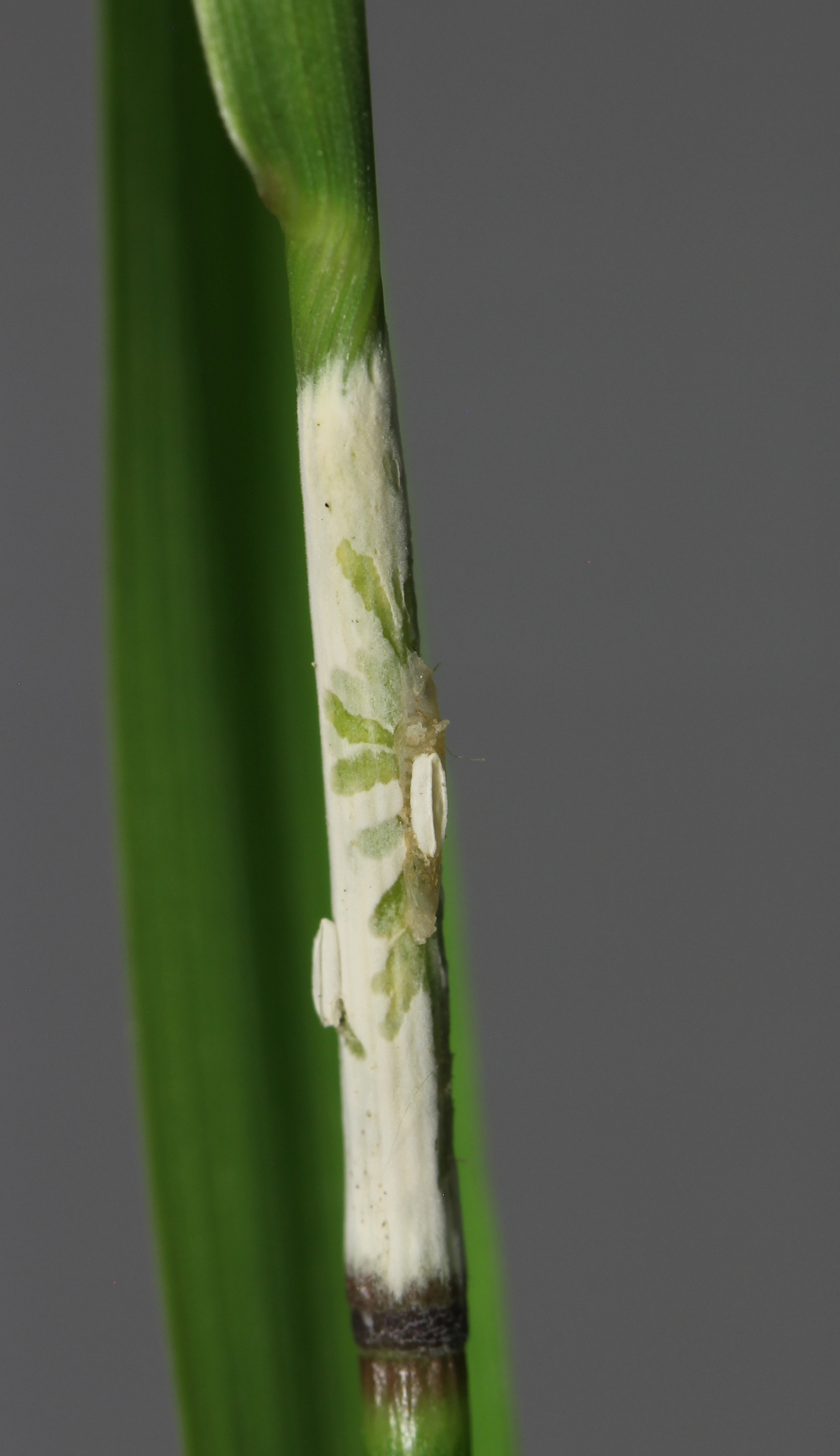
A stroma of Epichloë baconii formed on the grass Agrostis stolonifera, showing eggs, brood chambers and larval feeding tracks of Botanophila flies.

== Evolution ==
The epichloae display a number of central features that suggest a very strong and ancient association with their grass hosts. The symbiosis appears to have existed already during the early grass evolution that has spawned today's pooid grasses. This is suggested by phylogenetic studies indicating a preponderance of codivergence of Epichloë species with the grass hosts they inhabit. Growth of the fungal symbiont is very tightly regulated within its grass host, indicated by a largely unbranched mycelial morphology and remarkable synchrony of grass leaf and hyphal extension of the fungus; the latter seems to occur via a mechanism that involves stretch-induced or intercalary elongation of the endophyte's hyphae, a process so far not found in any other fungal species, indicating specialized adaptation of the fungus to the dynamic growth environment inside its host. A complex NADPH oxidase enzyme-based ROS-generating system in Epichloë species is indispensable for maintenance of this growth synchrony. Thus, it has been demonstrated that deletion of genes encoding these enzymes in Epichloë festucae causes severely disordered fungal growth in grass tissues and even death of the grass plant.

Molecular phylogenetic evidence demonstrates that asexual Epichloë species are derived either from sexual Epichloë species, or more commonly, are hybrids of two or more progenitor Epichloë species.

== Bioactive compounds ==
N-formylloline, an insecticidal alkaloid produced in several Epichloë–grass symbiota.

Many Epichloë endophytes produce a diverse range of natural product compounds with biological activities against a broad range of herbivores. The purpose of these compounds is as a toxicity or feeding deterrence against insect and mammalian herbivores. Ergoline alkaloids (which are ergot alkaloids, named after the ergot fungus, Claviceps purpurea, a close relative of the epichloae) are characterized by a ring system derived from 4-prenyl tryptophan. Among the most abundant ergot alkaloids in epichloë-symbiotic grasses is ergovaline, comprising an ergoline moiety attached to a bicyclic tripeptide containing the amino acids L-proline, L-alanine, and L-valine. Key genes and enzymes for ergot alkaloid biosynthesis have been identified in epichloae and include dmaW, encoding dimethylallyl-tryptophan synthase and lpsA, a non-ribosomal peptide synthetase.

Another group of epichloë alkaloids are the indole-diterpenoids, such as lolitrem B, which are produced from the activity of several enzymes, including prenyltransferases and various monooxygenases. Both the ergoline and indole-diterpenoid alkaloids have biological activity against mammalian herbivores, and also activity against some insects. Peramine is a pyrrolopyrazine alkaloid thought to be biosynthesized from the guanidinium-group-containing amino acid L-arginine, and pyrrolidine-5-carboxylate, a precursor of L-proline, and is an insect-feeding deterrent. One gene required for peramine synthesis – perA – was found by Tanaka et al., 2005. The loline alkaloids are 1-aminopyrrolizidines with an oxygen atom linking bridgehead carbons 2 and 7, and are biosynthesized from the amino acids L-proline and L-homoserine. The lolines have insecticidal and insect-deterrent activities comparable to nicotine. Loline accumulation is strongly induced in young growing tissues or by damage to the plant-fungus symbiotum. Many, but not all, epichloae produce up to three classes of these alkaloids in various combinations and amounts. Recently it has been shown that Epichloë uncinata infection and loline content afford × Festulolium grasses protection from black beetle (Heteronychus arator).

Many species in Epichloë produce biologically active alkaloids, such as ergot alkaloids, indole-diterpenoids (e.g., lolitrem B), loline alkaloids, and the unusual guanidinium alkaloid, peramine.

== Ecology ==
=== Effects on the grass plant ===
It has been proposed that vertically transmitted symbionts should evolve to be mutualists since their reproductive fitness is intimately tied to that of their hosts. In fact, some positive effects of epichloae on their host plants include increased growth, drought tolerance, and herbivore and pathogen resistance. Resistance against herbivores has been attributed to alkaloids produced by the symbiotic epichloae. Although grass-epichloë symbioses have been widely recognized to be mutualistic in many wild and cultivated grasses, the interactions can be highly variable and sometimes antagonistic, especially under nutrient-poor conditions in the soil.

=== Ecosystem dynamics ===
Due to the relatively large number of grass species harboring epichloae and the variety of environments in which they occur, the mechanisms underlying beneficial or antagonistic outcomes of epichloë-grass symbioses are difficult to delineate in natural and also agricultural environments. Some studies suggest a relationship between grazing by herbivores and increased epichloë infestation of the grasses on which they feed, whereas others indicate a complex interplay between plant species and fungal symbionts in response to herbivory or environmental conditions. The strong anti-herbivore activities of several bioactive compounds produced by the epichloae and relatively modest direct effects of the epichloae on plant growth and physiology suggest that these compounds play a major role in the persistence of the symbiosis.
