= Epichloë tembladerae =

Scientific classification
- Domain: Eukaryota
- Kingdom: Fungi
- Division: Ascomycota
- Class: Sordariomycetes
- Order: Hypocreales
- Family: Clavicipitaceae
- Genus: Epichloë
- Species: E. tembladerae

Binomial name
- Epichloë tembladerae (Cabral & J.F.White) Iannone & Schardl

Synonyms
- Neotyphodium tembladerae Cabral & J.F.White

Species of fungus

Epichloë tembladerae is a hybrid asexual species in the fungal genus Epichloë.

A systemic and seed-transmissible grass symbiont first described in 1999, Epichloë tembladerae is a natural allopolyploid of Epichloë festucae and a strain in the Epichloë typhina complex (from Poa nemoralis).

Epichloë tembladerae is found in North America, where it has been identified in the grass species Festuca arizonica, and in South America, where it has been found in numerous grass species, including Bromus auleticus, Bromus setifolius, Festuca argentina, Festuca hieronymi, Festuca magellanica, Festuca superba, Melica stuckertii, Phleum alpinum, Phleum commutatum, Poa huecu and Poa rigidifolia.
