= Epichloë guerinii =

Scientific classification
- Domain: Eukaryota
- Kingdom: Fungi
- Division: Ascomycota
- Class: Sordariomycetes
- Order: Hypocreales
- Family: Clavicipitaceae
- Genus: Epichloë
- Species: E. guerinii

Binomial name
- Epichloë guerinii (Guillaumin, Ravel & C.D.Moon) Leuchtm. & Schardl

Synonyms
- Neotyphodium guerinii Guillaumin, Ravel & C.D.Moon

Species of fungus

Epichloë guerinii is a hybrid asexual species in the fungal genus Epichloë.

A systemic and seed-transmissible grass symbiont first described in 2007, Epichloë guerinii is a natural allopolyploid of Epichloë gansuensis and a strain in the Epichloë typhina complex.

Epichloë guerinii is found in Europe, where it has been identified in the grass species Melica ciliata and Melica transsilvanica.
