= Epichloë funkii =

Scientific classification
- Domain: Eukaryota
- Kingdom: Fungi
- Division: Ascomycota
- Class: Sordariomycetes
- Order: Hypocreales
- Family: Clavicipitaceae
- Genus: Epichloë
- Species: E. funkii

Binomial name
- Epichloë funkii (K.D.Craven & Schardl) J.F.White

Synonyms
- Neotyphodium funkii K.D.Craven & Schardl

Species of fungus

Epichloë funkii is a hybrid asexual species in the fungal genus Epichloë.

A systemic and seed-transmissible grass symbiont first described in 2007, Epichloë funkii is a natural allopolyploid of Epichloë elymi and Epichloë festucae.

Epichloë funkii is found in North America, where it has been identified in the grass species Achnatherum robustum.
