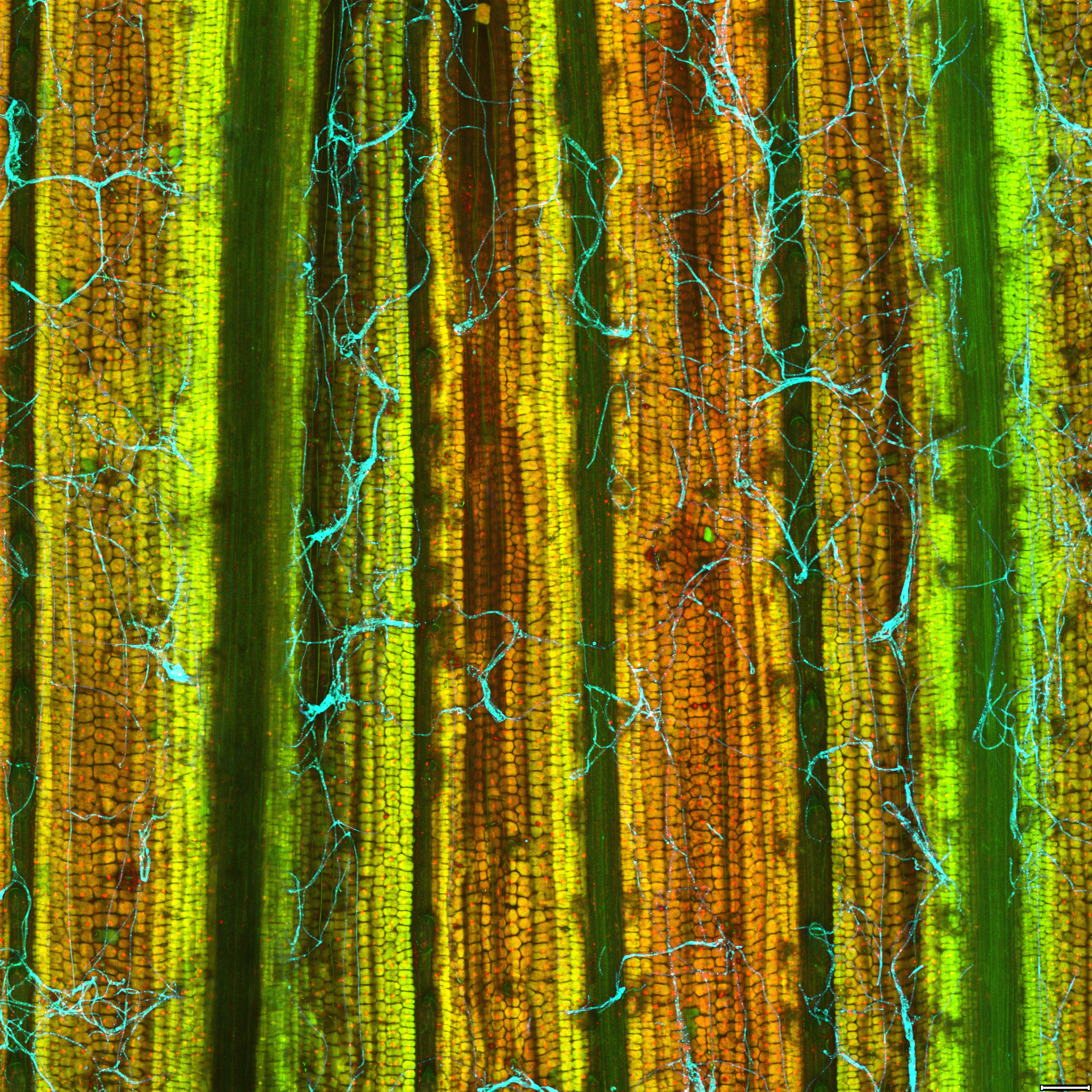

Scientific classification
- Domain: Eukaryota
- Kingdom: Fungi
- Division: Ascomycota
- Class: Sordariomycetes
- Order: Hypocreales
- Family: Clavicipitaceae
- Genus: Epichloë
- Species: E. scottii

Binomial name
- Epichloë scottii T.Thünen, Y. Becker, M.P.Cox & S.Ashrafi (2022)

= Epichloë scottii =

Species of fungus

Epichloë scottii is a haploid sexual species in the fungal genus Epichloë. A systemic and seed-transmissible grass symbiont first described in 2022, Epichloë scottii is a basal lineage branching prior to Epichloë glyceriae, and is the previously unidentified ancestor of the hybrid Epichloë species, Epichloë disjuncta.

Epichloë scottii was named in honor of Professor Barry Scott, Fellow of the Royal Society of New Zealand Te Apārangi, recognizing his long career researching the genus Epichloë.

Epichloë scottii is found in Europe, where it has been identified in the grass species Melica uniflora.
