= Epichloë melicicola =

Scientific classification
- Domain: Eukaryota
- Kingdom: Fungi
- Division: Ascomycota
- Class: Sordariomycetes
- Order: Hypocreales
- Family: Clavicipitaceae
- Genus: Epichloë
- Species: E. melicicola

Binomial name
- Epichloë melicicola (C.D.Moon & Schardl) Schardl

Synonyms
- Neotyphodium melicicola C.D.Moon & Schardl

Species of fungus

Epichloë melicicola is a systemic and seed-transmissible endophyte of Melica dendroides (syn. Melica decumbens Thunb.) and Melica racemosa, grasses endemic to southern Africa. It was described as a Neotyphodium species in 2002 but transferred to the genus Epichloë in 2014.

The two host plant species are locally called "dronkgras" because they can cause staggers in grazing livestock. Similar staggers symptoms are associated with several other grasses worldwide when they possess certain symbiotic Neotyphodium species that produce indole-diterpene alkaloids such as lolitrems.

Molecular phylogenetic analysis indicates that E. melicicola is an interspecific hybrid, and that its closest relatives are the teleomorphic (sexual) species, Epichloë festucae, and the anamorphic (asexual) species, Epichloë aotearoae.
