= Epichloë brachyelytri =

Scientific classification
- Kingdom: Fungi
- Division: Ascomycota
- Class: Sordariomycetes
- Order: Hypocreales
- Family: Clavicipitaceae
- Genus: Epichloë
- Species: E. brachyelytri

Binomial name
- Epichloë brachyelytri Schardl & Leuchtm.

Species of fungus

Epichloë brachyelytri is a haploid sexual species in the fungal genus Epichloë.

A systemic and seed-transmissible grass symbiont first described in 1999, Epichloë brachyelytri is a sister lineage to Epichloë aotearoae. Epichloe" grass endophytes comprise group of filamentous fungi of both sexual and asexual species.

Epichloë brachyelytri is found in North America, where it has been identified in the grass species Brachyelytrum erectum. To date six Eurasian's and one North American morphospecies have been described, and these approximately corresponding to six distinct mating populations. Often Epichloe" confer to their host a range of fitness benefits, including enhanced resistance to biotic and abiotic stresses. One such benefit is defense against plant herbivore that is attributable to various alkaloids produced by these fungi.
