= Epichloë siegelii =

Scientific classification
- Domain: Eukaryota
- Kingdom: Fungi
- Division: Ascomycota
- Class: Sordariomycetes
- Order: Hypocreales
- Family: Clavicipitaceae
- Genus: Epichloë
- Species: E. siegelii

Binomial name
- Epichloë siegelii (K.D.Craven, Leuchtm. & Schardl) Leuchtm. & Schardl

Synonyms
- Neotyphodium × siegelii K.D.Craven, Leuchtm. & Schardl

Species of fungus

Epichloë siegelii is a hybrid asexual species in the fungal genus Epichloë.

A systemic and seed-transmissible grass symbiont first described in 2001, Epichloë siegelii is a natural allopolyploid of Epichloë amarillans and Epichloë elymi.

Epichloë siegelii is found in Europe, where it has been identified in the grass species Schedonorus pratensis (synonymous with Festuca pratensis and Lolium pratense).
