= Epichloë sinensis =

Scientific classification
- Domain: Eukaryota
- Kingdom: Fungi
- Division: Ascomycota
- Class: Sordariomycetes
- Order: Hypocreales
- Family: Clavicipitaceae
- Genus: Epichloë
- Species: E. sinensis

Binomial name
- Epichloë sinensis P. Tian, C.J. Li & Z.B. Nan

Species of fungus

Epichloë sinensis is a hybrid asexual species in the fungal genus Epichloë.

A systemic and seed-transmissible grass symbiont first described in 2020, Epichloë sinensis is a natural allopolyploid of Epichloë sibirica and Epichloë typhina subsp. poae.

Epichloë sinensis is found in Asia, specifically Northwest China, where it has been identified in the grass species Festuca sinensis.
