= Epichloë canadensis =

Scientific classification
- Domain: Eukaryota
- Kingdom: Fungi
- Division: Ascomycota
- Class: Sordariomycetes
- Order: Hypocreales
- Family: Clavicipitaceae
- Genus: Epichloë
- Species: E. canadensis

Binomial name
- Epichloë canadensis N.D. Charlton & C.A. Young

Species of fungus

Epichloë canadensis is a hybrid asexual species in the fungal genus Epichloë.

A systemic and seed-transmissible grass symbiont first described in 2012, Epichloë canadensis is a natural allopolyploid of Epichloë amarillans and Epichloë elymi.

Epichloë canadensis is found in North America, where it has been identified in the grass species Elymus canadensis.
