= Sleepy grass =

Sleepy grass may refer to:

- Achnatherum robustum, a plant with a sedative effect on mammals who eat it.
- Mimosa pudica, a plant whose leaves fold inward when touched.
