= Epichloë danica =

Scientific classification
- Domain: Eukaryota
- Kingdom: Fungi
- Division: Ascomycota
- Class: Sordariomycetes
- Order: Hypocreales
- Family: Clavicipitaceae
- Genus: Epichloë
- Species: E. danica

Binomial name
- Epichloë danica Leuchtm. & M.Oberhofer

Species of fungus

Epichloë danica is a hybrid asexual species in the fungal genus Epichloë.

A systemic and seed-transmissible grass symbiont first described in 2013, Epichloë danica is a natural allopolyploid of Epichloë bromicola and Epichloë sylvatica.

Epichloë danica is found in Europe, where it has been identified in the grass species Hordelymus europaeus.
