= Epichloë australiensis =

Scientific classification
- Domain: Eukaryota
- Kingdom: Fungi
- Division: Ascomycota
- Class: Sordariomycetes
- Order: Hypocreales
- Family: Clavicipitaceae
- Genus: Epichloë
- Species: E. australiensis

Binomial name
- Epichloë australiensis (C.D. Moon & Schardl) Leuchtm.

Synonyms
- Neotyphodium australiense C.D. Moon & Schardl

Species of fungus

Epichloë australiensis is a systemic and seed-transmissible symbiont of the grass Echinopogon ovatus. It was originally described as a Neotyphodium species but later transferred to the genus Epichloë.

To date, Epichloë australiensis has only been found in some Australian populations of its host grass, whereas other populations in Australia and New Zealand have Epichloë aotearoae. Molecular phylogenetic analysis indicates that Epichloë australiensis is an interspecific hybrid, and that its closest teleomorphic (sexual) relatives are Epichloë festucae and a strain in the Epichloë typhina complex (from Poa pratensis).
