= Epichloë sinofestucae =

Scientific classification
- Domain: Eukaryota
- Kingdom: Fungi
- Division: Ascomycota
- Class: Sordariomycetes
- Order: Hypocreales
- Family: Clavicipitaceae
- Genus: Epichloë
- Species: E. sinofestucae

Binomial name
- Epichloë sinofestucae (Y.G.Chen, Y.L.Ji & Z.W.Wang) Leuchtm.

Synonyms
- Neotyphodium sinofestucae Y.G.Chen, Y.L.Ji & Z.W.Wang

Species of fungus

Epichloë sinofestucae is a hybrid asexual species in the fungal genus Epichloë.

A systemic and seed-transmissible grass symbiont first described in 2009, Epichloë sinofestucae is a natural allopolyploid of Epichloë bromicola and a strain in the Epichloë typhina complex.

Epichloë sinofestucae is found in Asia, where it has been identified in the grass species Festuca parvigluma.
