= Epichloë pampeana =

Scientific classification
- Domain: Eukaryota
- Kingdom: Fungi
- Division: Ascomycota
- Class: Sordariomycetes
- Order: Hypocreales
- Family: Clavicipitaceae
- Genus: Epichloë
- Species: E. pampeana

Binomial name
- Epichloë pampeana (Iannone & Cabral) Iannone & Schardl

Synonyms
- Neotyphodium pampeanum Iannone & Cabral

Species of fungus

Epichloë pampeana is a hybrid asexual species in the fungal genus Epichloë.

A systemic and seed-transmissible grass symbiont first described in 2009, Epichloë pampeana is a natural allopolyploid of Epichloë festucae and a strain from the Epichloë typhina complex (from Poa nemoralis).

Epichloë pampeana is found in South America, where it has been identified in the grass species Bromus auleticus.
