= Epichloë gansuensis =

Scientific classification
- Domain: Eukaryota
- Kingdom: Fungi
- Division: Ascomycota
- Class: Sordariomycetes
- Order: Hypocreales
- Family: Clavicipitaceae
- Genus: Epichloë
- Species: E. gansuensis

Binomial name
- Epichloë gansuensis (C.J. Li & Nan) Schardl

Synonyms
- Neotyphodium gansuense C.J. Li & Nan

Species of fungus

Epichloë gansuensis is a haploid species in the fungal genus Epichloë. The sexual phase has not been observed.

A systemic and seed-transmissible grass symbiont first described in 2004, Epichloë gansuensis is a sister lineage to Epichloë sibirica and an early branching lineage on the Epichloë tree.

Epichloë gansuensis is found in Asia, where it has been identified in the grass species Achnatherum inebrians, Achnatherum sibiricum and Achnatherum pekinense.

== Varieties ==
Epichloë gansuensis has one variety.

Epichloë gansuensis subsp. inebrians (C.D. Moon & Schardl) Schardl was first described in 2007. It is found in Asia in the grass species Achnatherum inebrians.
