= Epichloë schardlii =

Scientific classification
- Domain: Eukaryota
- Kingdom: Fungi
- Division: Ascomycota
- Class: Sordariomycetes
- Order: Hypocreales
- Family: Clavicipitaceae
- Genus: Epichloë
- Species: E. schardlii

Binomial name
- Epichloë schardlii (Ghimire, Rudgers & K.D.Craven) Leuchtm.

Synonyms
- Neotyphodium × schardlii Ghimire, Rudgers & K.D.Craven

Species of fungus

Epichloë schardlii is a hybrid asexual species in the fungal genus Epichloë.

A systemic and seed-transmissible grass symbiont first described in 2017, Epichloë schardlii is a natural allopolyploid of two strains in the Epichloë typhina complex (subsp. poae × subsp. poae).

Epichloë schardlii is found in North America, where it has been identified in the grass species Poa alsodes.
