= Epichloë occultans =

Scientific classification
- Domain: Eukaryota
- Kingdom: Fungi
- Division: Ascomycota
- Class: Sordariomycetes
- Order: Hypocreales
- Family: Clavicipitaceae
- Genus: Epichloë
- Species: E. occultans

Binomial name
- Epichloë occultans (C.D.Moon, B.Scott & M.J.Chr.) Schardl

Synonyms
- Neotyphodium occultans C.D.Moon, B.Scott & M.J.Chr.

Species of fungus

Epichloë occultans is a hybrid asexual species in the fungal genus Epichloë.

A systemic and seed-transmissible grass symbiont first described in 2000, Epichloë occultans is a natural allopolyploid of Epichloë baconii (the Lolium associated clade) and Epichloë bromicola.

Epichloë occultans is found in Europe and North Africa, and has been introduced into New Zealand and elsewhere, where it has been identified in the grass species Lolium multiflorum and Lolium rigidum.
