= Epichloë liyangensis =

Scientific classification
- Domain: Eukaryota
- Kingdom: Fungi
- Division: Ascomycota
- Class: Sordariomycetes
- Order: Hypocreales
- Family: Clavicipitaceae
- Genus: Epichloë
- Species: E. liyangensis

Binomial name
- Epichloë liyangensis Z.W.Wang, Y.Kang & H.Miao

Species of fungus

Epichloë liyangensis is a hybrid asexual species in the fungal genus Epichloë.

A systemic and seed-transmissible grass symbiont first described in 2011, Epichloë liyangensis is a natural allopolyploid of Epichloë bromicola and a strain from the Epichloë typhina complex (from Poa nemoralis).

Epichloë liyangensis is found in Asia, where it has been identified in the grass species Poa pratensis subsp. pratensis.
