= Epichloë cabralii =

Scientific classification
- Domain: Eukaryota
- Kingdom: Fungi
- Division: Ascomycota
- Class: Sordariomycetes
- Order: Hypocreales
- Family: Clavicipitaceae
- Genus: Epichloë
- Species: E. cabralii

Binomial name
- Epichloë cabralii Iannone, M.S. Rossi & Schardl

Species of fungus

Epichloë cabralii is a hybrid asexual species in the fungal genus Epichloë.

A systemic and seed-transmissible grass symbiont first described in 2014, Epichloë canadensis is a natural allopolyploid of Epichloë amarillans and a strain from the Epichloë typhina complex (from Poa nemoralis).

Epichloë cabralii is found in Argentina (Santa Cruz, Tierra del Fuego), where it has been identified in the grass species Phleum alpinum.
