= Epichloë sinica =

Scientific classification
- Domain: Eukaryota
- Kingdom: Fungi
- Division: Ascomycota
- Class: Sordariomycetes
- Order: Hypocreales
- Family: Clavicipitaceae
- Genus: Epichloë
- Species: E. sinica

Binomial name
- Epichloë sinica (Z.W. Wang, Y.L. Ji & Y. Kang); Leuchtm.

Synonyms
- Neotyphodium sinicum Z.W. Wang, Y.L. Ji & Y. Kang

Species of fungus

Epichloë sinica is a hybrid asexual species in the fungal genus Epichloë.

A systemic and seed-transmissible grass symbiont first described in 2009, Epichloë sinica is a natural allopolyploid of Epichloë bromicola and a strain in the Epichloë typhina complex.

Epichloë sinica is found in Asia, where it has been identified in species of the grass genus Roegneria.
