= Epichloë alsodes =

Scientific classification
- Domain: Eukaryota
- Kingdom: Fungi
- Division: Ascomycota
- Class: Sordariomycetes
- Order: Hypocreales
- Family: Clavicipitaceae
- Genus: Epichloë
- Species: E. alsodes

Binomial name
- Epichloë alsodes T. Shymanovich, C.A. Young, N.D. Charlton & S.H. Faeth

Species of fungus

Epichloë alsodes is a hybrid asexual species in the fungal genus Epichloë.

A systemic and seed-transmissible grass symbiont first described in 2017, Epichloë alsodes is a natural allopolyploid of Epichloë amarillans and Epichloë typhina subsp. poae.

Epichloë alsodes is found in North America, where it has been identified in the grass species Poa alsodes.
