= Epichloë chisosa =

Scientific classification
- Domain: Eukaryota
- Kingdom: Fungi
- Division: Ascomycota
- Class: Sordariomycetes
- Order: Hypocreales
- Family: Clavicipitaceae
- Genus: Epichloë
- Species: E. chisosa

Binomial name
- Epichloë chisosa (J.F.White & Morgan-Jones) Schardl

Synonyms
- Acremonium chisosum J.F.White & Morgan-Jones; Neotyphodium chisosum (J.F.White & Morgan-Jones) Glenn, C.W.Bacon & Hanlin

Species of fungus

Epichloë chisosa is a hybrid asexual species in the fungal genus Epichloë.

A systemic and seed-transmissible grass symbiont first described in 1996, Epichloë chisosa is a natural triploid allopolyploid of Epichloë amarillans, Epichloë bromicola and a strain in the Epichloë typhina complex (from Poa pratensis).

Epichloë chisosa is found in North America, where it has been identified in the grass species Achnatherum eminens.
