= Epichloë hordelymi =

Scientific classification
- Domain: Eukaryota
- Kingdom: Fungi
- Division: Ascomycota
- Class: Sordariomycetes
- Order: Hypocreales
- Family: Clavicipitaceae
- Genus: Epichloë
- Species: E. hordelymi

Binomial name
- Epichloë hordelymi Leuchtm. & M. Oberhofer

Species of fungus

Epichloë hordelymi is a hybrid asexual species in the fungal genus Epichloë.

A systemic and seed-transmissible grass symbiont first described in 2013, Epichloë hordelymi is a natural allopolyploid of Epichloë bromicola and a strain in the Epichloë typhina complex.

Epichloë hordelymi is found in Europe, where it has been identified in the grass species Hordelymus europaeus.
