= Neotyphodium chilense =

Scientific classification
- Kingdom: Fungi
- Division: Ascomycota
- Class: Sordariomycetes
- Order: Hypocreales
- Family: Clavicipitaceae
- Genus: Neotyphodium
- Species: N. chilense

Binomial name
- Neotyphodium chilense (Morgan-Jones, J.F.White & Point.) Glenn, C.W.Bacon & Hanlin (1996)

Species of fungus

Neotyphodium chilense is a species of fungus in the Clavicipitaceae family, which is an endophyte that lives in the grass Dactylis glomerata in southern Chile. Originally known as Acremonium chilense when it was first described in 1990, it was transferred from Acremonium to Neotyphodium in 1996. Currently, it should be treated as Acremonium chilense since the previous transfer to Neotyphodium is untested.
