= Epichloë novae-zelandiae =

Scientific classification
- Domain: Eukaryota
- Kingdom: Fungi
- Division: Ascomycota
- Class: Sordariomycetes
- Order: Hypocreales
- Family: Clavicipitaceae
- Genus: Epichloë
- Species: E. novae-zelandiae

Binomial name
- Epichloë novae-zelandiae Leuchtm. & A.V.Stewart

Species of fungus

Epichloë novae-zelandiae is a hybrid asexual species in the fungal genus Epichloë.

A systemic and seed-transmissible grass symbiont first described in 2019, Epichloë novae-zelandiae is a natural triploid allopolyploid of Epichloë amarillans, Epichloë bromicola and Epichloë typhina subsp. poae.

Epichloë novae-zelandiae is found in New Zealand, where it has been identified in the grass species Poa matthewsii.
