= Epichloë uncinata =

Scientific classification
- Domain: Eukaryota
- Kingdom: Fungi
- Division: Ascomycota
- Class: Sordariomycetes
- Order: Hypocreales
- Family: Clavicipitaceae
- Genus: Epichloë
- Species: E. uncinata

Binomial name
- Epichloë uncinata (W.Gams, Petrini & D.Schmidt) Leuchtm. & Schardl

Synonyms
- Acremonium uncinatum W.Gams, Petrini & D.Schmidt; Neotyphodium uncinatum (W.Gams, Petrini & D.Schmidt) Glenn, C.W.Bacon & Hanlin

Species of fungus

Epichloë uncinata is a hybrid asexual species in the fungal genus Epichloë.

A systemic and seed-transmissible grass symbiont first described in 1990, Epichloë uncinata is a natural allopolyploid of Epichloë bromicola and a strain in the Epichloë typhina complex.

Epichloë uncinata is found in Europe, where it has been identified in the grass species Schedonorus pratensis (also called Festuca pratensis or Lolium pratense).
