= Leymus chinensis =

Scientific classification
- Kingdom: Plantae
- Clade: Tracheophytes
- Clade: Angiosperms
- Clade: Monocots
- Clade: Commelinids
- Order: Poales
- Family: Poaceae
- Subfamily: Pooideae
- Genus: Leymus
- Species: L. chinensis

Binomial name
- Leymus chinensis (Trin.) Tzvelev

Species of grass

Leymus chinensis, commonly known as false wheatgrass or Chinese rye grass, is a species of wild rye native to China, Korea, Mongolia and Russia.

== Description ==
Leymus chinensis is a perennial plant that is normally 40–90 cm tall and is native to northern China. It is a plant that can potentially be used as a food source in future generations. Scientists have tested the effects of various stimuli on Leymus chinensis. If optimum conditions for the growth of this plant are discovered, then this plant has the capability to eventually become a potential food source for humanity.

== Temperature and light effects on germination ==
Temperature and light greatly affect the germination of several species of grasses. Leymus chinensis shows 47% germination under variable temperatures ranging from 10 to 30 °C. De-husking (removing outer-covering of seeds) at constant temperature was shown to also improve germination. The effects of light have had an interesting effect on the germination of Leymus chinensis. The plants were assessed according to three independent variables: effect of light or dark conditions under which germination occurred, the temperature under which the germination had occurred, and lastly, if the temperature had fluctuated with another temperature by about 10 °C. The effects were shown to have statistical significance but leave doors open as to why this trend had occurred. Under the conditions of light, only 7% of the Leymus chinensis seedlings had germinated at 20 °C. Under the dark conditions, almost triple the amount of seedlings germinated at 25% at 20 °C. The results were significantly lower for both the dark and light populations at the fluctuating temperatures. At 15 to 25 °C, only 15% germinated in dark and 3% germinated in light. The trend continued at 20 to 30 °C, as only about 7% germinated in dark and 1-2% germinated in light conditions.

== pH and salt effects on germination ==
The effects of salt and pH were studied on germination as well with different findings. Increasing salt and pH decreases the rate of germination in Leymus chinensis. However, after treatments, seeds that were transferred to DI water germinated normally. A pH of 8.05 showed a remarkable decrease in growth. Water-buffered pH did not affect germination of Leymus chinensis; however, at 50 and 100mM of tris, germination severely decreased. Germination increased in basic environments. Different salt concentrations negatively affected germination: Na_{2}CO_{3} > NaHCO_{3} > NaCl > Na_{2}SO_{4}, with Na_{2}CO_{3} having the most detrimental effect on seed germination and Na_{2}SO_{4} having the least effect.

== Chemical effects on germination ==
Other effects such as those of fluridone, GA3, and KNO_{3} were also tested on germination. A control was set as a basis of comparison to the three added chemicals. The control had a 25% germination rate, and all the seeds were performed under a standard 20 °C temperature. Fluridone did not significantly affect germination as compared to the control, as the percentage of fluridone plus the seedlings was also about 25%. However, GA3 and KNO_{3} both exhibited a significant difference when added to the seedlings. The GA3 increased the percent germinated to 36%, and KNO_{3} increased germination to an even higher 44%. Both of these turned to be strikingly different from the control which had only 25% of its seeds germinate.

When nitrogen was added at the early-vegetative stage of Leymus chinensis, it increased the inflorescence number. Adding nitrogen during the beginning of autumn and watering the plants during the final moments of the growing season may improve yield for this plant. There is a strong correlation between increased inflorescence number and fall tillers.

== Dry storage effects on germination ==
The effect of dry storage was also tested on the effects of germination. The variables tested here are storage at 5 and 20 °C with a control at 0 °C, along with if the seeds were in light or dark conditions at each temperature. Another variable was that at each temperature and light condition, there was a duration of dry storage for the seeds. The seeds could have been stored at either 1, 3, or 6 months before measuring percentage of germination. At both temperatures of 5 and 20 °C and for only 3 and 6 months of storage for light conditions and at 1, 3, and 6 months of storage for dark conditions, there was a significant increase in the percentage of germination. The seeds did not differentiate much when it came to after-ripening, which indicates the germination potential of a seed at specific conditions. However, at 3 months of dry storage at 20 °C under light and dark conditions, there was an apparent significant increase in the percentage of germination in the seeds as compared to the 5 °C conditions. In addition, at 6 months of dry storage at 20 °C for just light conditions, there was a higher percentage of germinated seeds, as compared to the conditions at 5 °C.
