= Bromus tomentellus =

Scientific classification
- Kingdom: Plantae
- Clade: Embryophytes
- Clade: Tracheophytes
- Clade: Spermatophytes
- Clade: Angiosperms
- Clade: Monocots
- Clade: Commelinids
- Order: Poales
- Family: Poaceae
- Subfamily: Pooideae
- Genus: Bromus
- Species: B. tomentellus

Binomial name
- Bromus tomentellus Boiss.

Synonyms
- List: Bromopsis shelkovnikovii (Tzvelev) Holub; Bromopsis tomentella (Boiss.) Holub; Bromopsis tomentella subsp. nivalis (Bornm.) H.Scholz; Bromopsis tomentella subsp. shelkovnikovii (Tzvelev) Tzvelev; Bromopsis tomentella subsp. woronowii (Tzvelev) Tzvelev; Bromopsis woronowii (Tzvelev) Czerep.; Bromus sphacioticus Gand.; Bromus tomentellus var. nivalis Bornm.; Bromus tomentellus subsp. nivalis (Bornm.) H.Scholz & Byfield; Zerna tomentella (Boiss.) Nevski; Zerna tomentella subsp. shelkovnikovii Tzvelev

Species of flowering plant

Bromus tomentellus, the wooly brome, is a species of flowering plant in the family Poaceae, native to Crete, Turkey, the Caucusus, the Levant, Iraq, Iran, and Turkmenistan. It is a regionally important livestock forage species.
