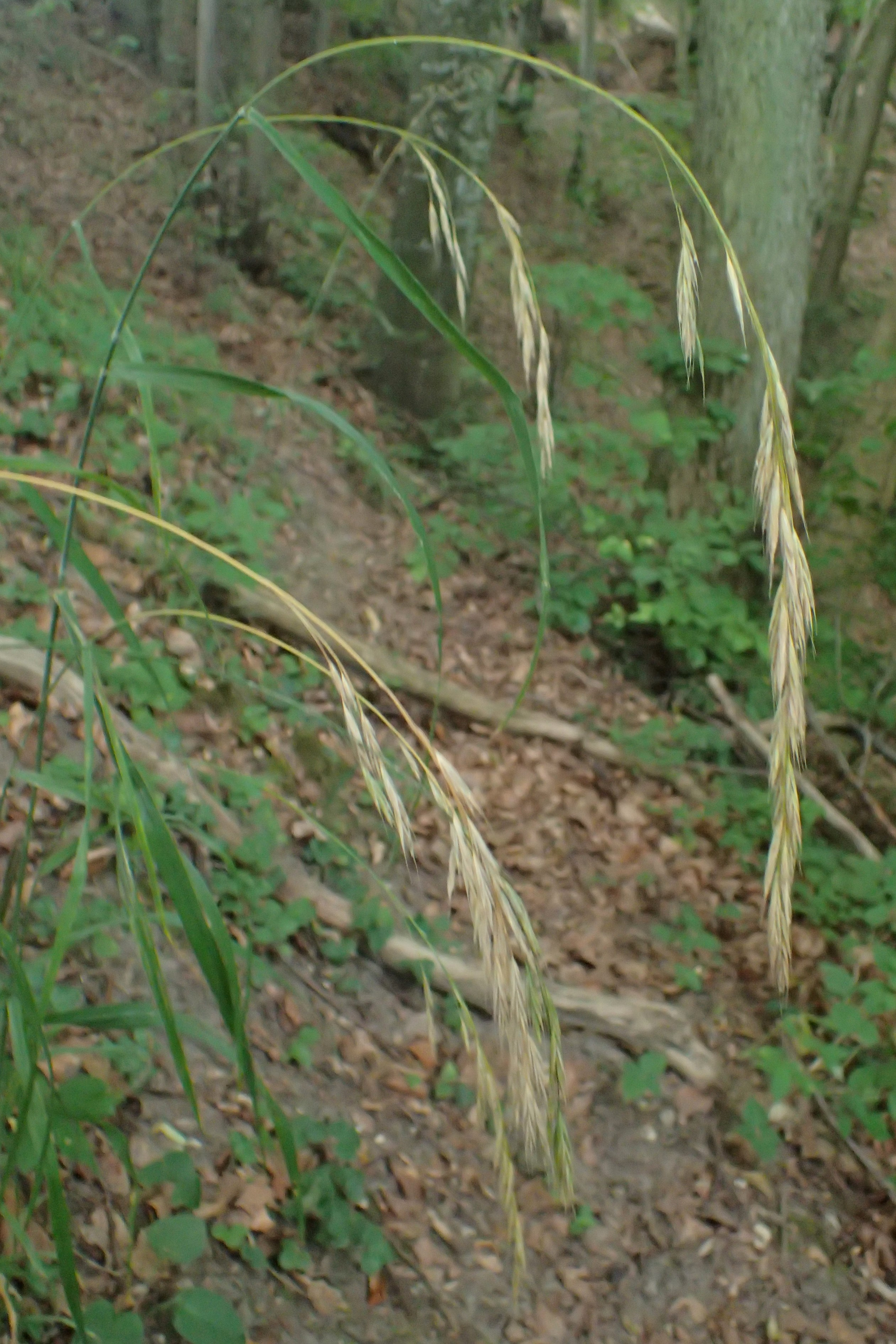

Scientific classification
- Kingdom: Plantae
- Clade: Tracheophytes
- Clade: Angiosperms
- Clade: Monocots
- Clade: Commelinids
- Order: Poales
- Family: Poaceae
- Subfamily: Pooideae
- Genus: Bromus
- Species: B. benekenii

Binomial name
- Bromus benekenii (Lange) Trimen

Synonyms
- Bromopsis benekenii (Lange) Holub

= Bromus benekenii =

Species of grass

Bromus benekenii is a species of grass in the family Poaceae.

Its native range is Northwestern Africa, Europe to China.
