= Melica persica =

Scientific classification
- Kingdom: Plantae
- Clade: Tracheophytes
- Clade: Angiosperms
- Clade: Monocots
- Clade: Commelinids
- Order: Poales
- Family: Poaceae
- Subfamily: Pooideae
- Genus: Melica
- Species: M. persica

Binomial name
- Melica persica Kunth

Species of grass

Melica persica is a species of grass that can be found in Central Asia, India, and in Gansu, Jilin, Sichuan provinces of China.

== Description ==
The species is perennial and caespitose with elongated rhizomes. It culms are erect 15–50 centimetres (5.9–19.7 in) long. The leaf-sheaths are smooth, tubular and have one closed end. The leaf-blades are flat and are 5–15 centimetres (2.0–5.9 in) long by 2–4 millimetres (0.079–0.157 in) wide while the membrane is eciliatd and is 0.5–3 millimetres (0.020–0.118 in) long. Both leaf-sheaths and leaf-blades have glabrous surface. The panicle is linear, spiciform, secund and is 3.5–12 centimetres (1.4–4.7 in) long.

Spikelets are cuneate, solitary, are 5.5–10 millimetres (0.22–0.39 in) long and have fertile spikelets that are pediceled. Its lemma have hairs that are 4–5 millimetres (0.16–0.20 in) long. It is also have an acute apex with the fertile lemma itself being chartaceous, elliptic, keelless, and is 4–7.5 millimetres (0.16–0.30 in) long. The species also carry 2–3 sterile florets which are barren, cuneate, clumped and are 2 millimetres (0.079 in) long. Both the upper and lower glumes are oblong, keelless, and are membranous. Their size is different though; lower one is 2.5–6.5 millimetres (0.098–0.256 in) long while the upper one is 5.5–10 millimetres (0.22–0.39 in) long. It palea is 2-veined.

Flowers are fleshy, oblong, truncate, have 2 lodicules and grow together. They have 3 anthers with fruits that are caryopsis. The fruit is also have additional pericarp with a linear hilum.

== Ecology ==
Melica persica grows on grassy hillsides and stony ones too.
