= Epichloë sibirica =

Scientific classification
- Domain: Eukaryota
- Kingdom: Fungi
- Division: Ascomycota
- Class: Sordariomycetes
- Order: Hypocreales
- Family: Clavicipitaceae
- Genus: Epichloë
- Species: E. sibirica

Binomial name
- Epichloë sibirica (X. Zhang & Y.B. Gao) Tadych

Synonyms
- Neotyphodium sibiricum X. Zhang & Y.B. Gao

Species of fungus

Epichloë sibirica is a haploid species in the fungal genus Epichloë.

A systemic and seed-transmissible grass symbiont first described in 2009, Epichloë sibirica is a sister lineage to Epichloë gansuensis and an early branching clade on the Epichloë tree.

Epichloë sibirica is found in Asia, where it has been identified in the grass species Achnatherum sibiricum. Epichloë sibirica is not known to be sexual.
