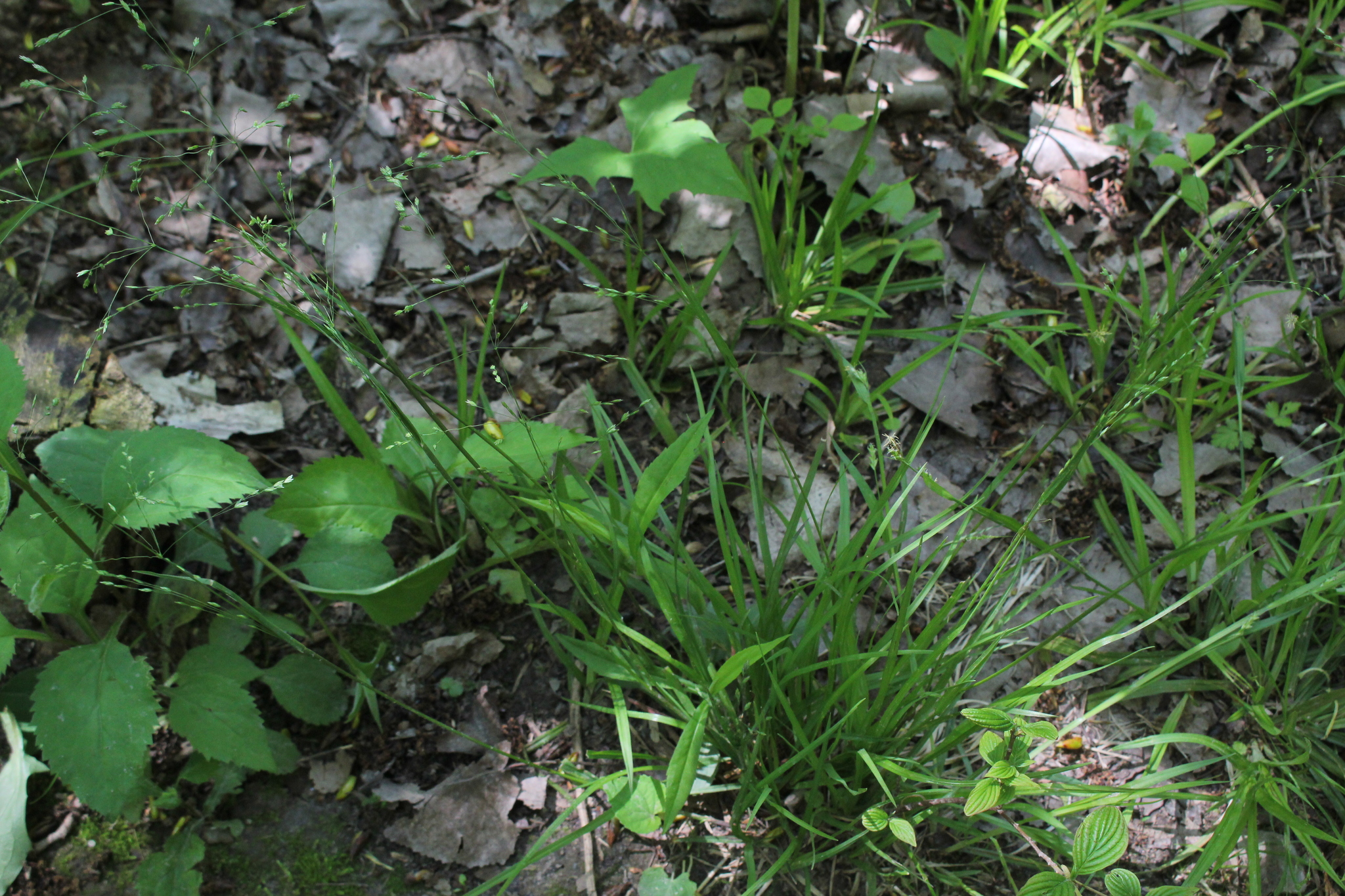
- Poa alsodes found in Ontario, Canada
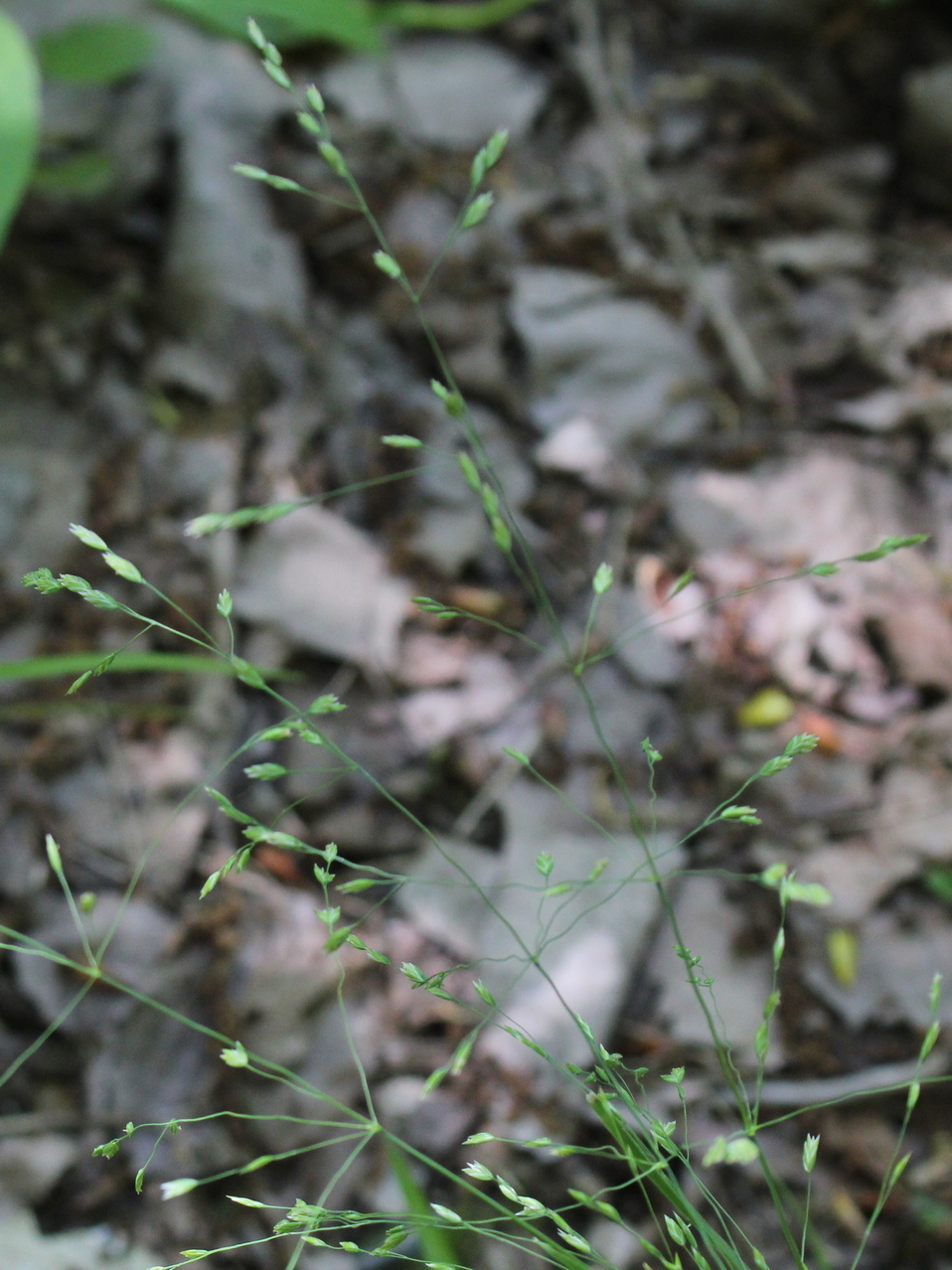
- Close up

Conservation status
- Secure (NatureServe)

Scientific classification
- Kingdom: Plantae
- Clade: Tracheophytes
- Clade: Angiosperms
- Clade: Monocots
- Clade: Commelinids
- Order: Poales
- Family: Poaceae
- Subfamily: Pooideae
- Genus: Poa
- Species: P. alsodes

Binomial name
- Poa alsodes A.Gray

= Poa alsodes =

Species of grass found across eastern North America

Poa alsodes, also known as the grove bluegrass, wood bluegrass, or the grove meadow grass, is a perennial species of grass in the family Poaceae. They are found in North America in areas like eastern Canada and the Appalachian Mountains.

This species could potentially be threatened due to a variety of factors such as invasive species, logging, development, etc.

== Description ==
These plants grow from 0.3-1.5 meters in height. The leaves of this plant are hairy, mostly flat and thin with their thickness being between 0.5-5 millimeters thick. At the end, they are boat shaped. Leaves more at the base are floppy.

They can be confused with Poa saltuensis and Poa trivialis.

== Habitat ==
They grow in shaded or partly shaded places with average to wet soil. This includes wooded areas, thickets, floodplains, seeps, riverbanks and swamps.

They are found on the continent of North America. In the United States, they can be found in the New England area (Maine, Vermont, Connecticut and New Hampshire), New York, Pennsylvania, Virginia, West Virginia, North Carolina, South Carolina, Tennessee, Kentucky, Ohio, Illinois, Michigan, Wisconsin and Minnesota. In Canada, it can be found in provinces such as Ontario, Quebec, Nova Scotia, etc.
