= Epichloë sylvatica =

Scientific classification
- Domain: Eukaryota
- Kingdom: Fungi
- Division: Ascomycota
- Class: Sordariomycetes
- Order: Hypocreales
- Family: Clavicipitaceae
- Genus: Epichloë
- Species: E. sylvatica

Binomial name
- Epichloë sylvatica Leuchtm. & Schardl

Species of fungus

Epichloë sylvatica is a haploid sexual species in the fungal genus Epichloë.

A systemic and seed-transmissible grass symbiont first described in 1998, Epichloë sylvatica forms a clade within the Epichloë typhina complex.

Epichloë sylvatica is found from Europe to Asia, where it has been identified in association with two grass species, Brachypodium sylvaticum and Hordelymus europaeus.

== Subspecies ==
Epichloë sylvatica has one subspecies, Epichloë sylvatica subsp. pollinensis Leuchtm. & M. Oberhofer. Described in 2013, Epichloë sylvatica subsp. pollinensis has been found in Europe in the grass species Hordelymus europaeus.
