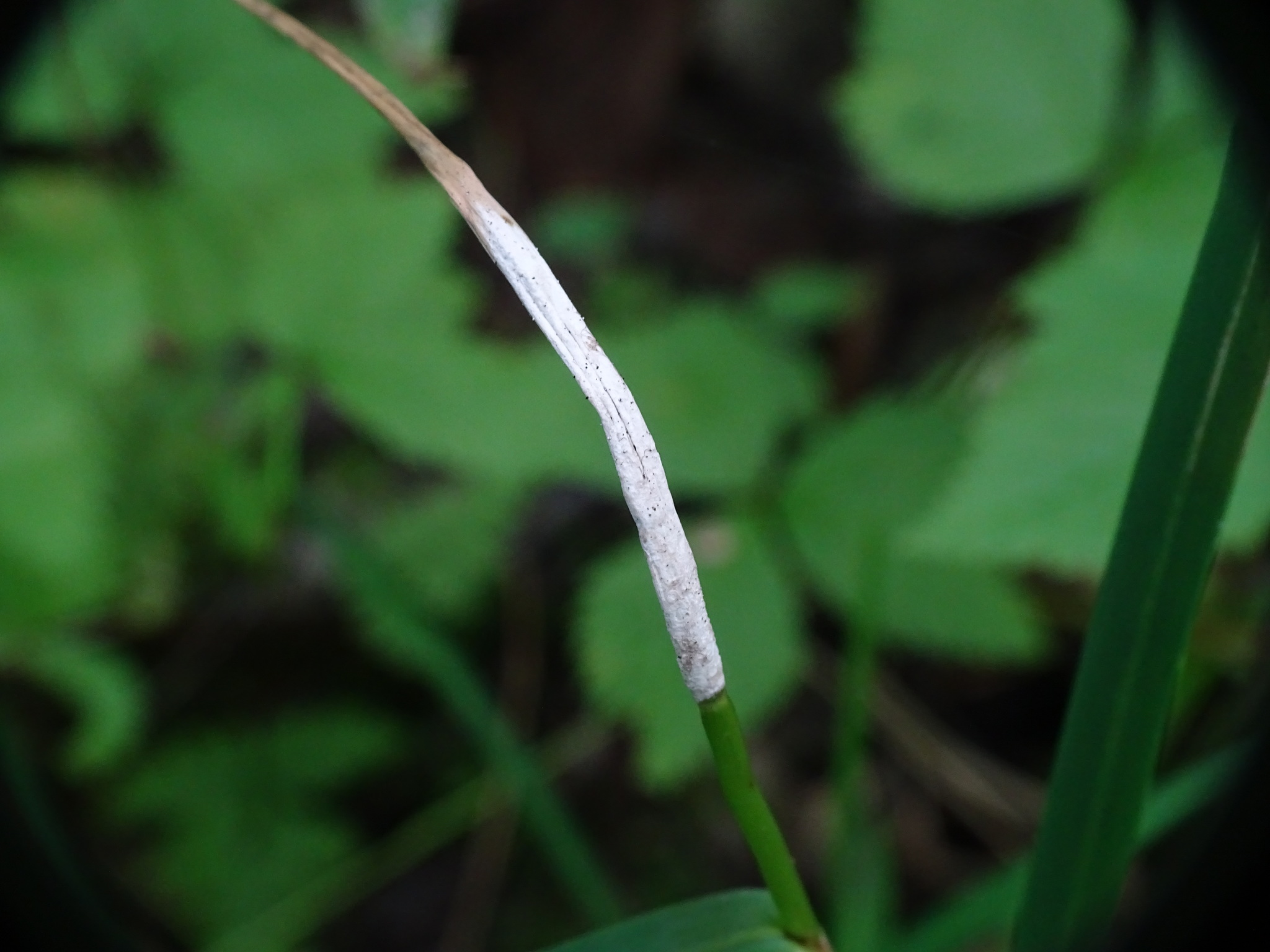

Scientific classification
- Domain: Eukaryota
- Kingdom: Fungi
- Division: Ascomycota
- Class: Sordariomycetes
- Order: Hypocreales
- Family: Clavicipitaceae
- Genus: Epichloë
- Species: E. glyceriae

Binomial name
- Epichloë glyceriae Schardl & Leuchtm.

= Epichloë glyceriae =

Species of fungus

Epichloë glyceriae is a haploid sexual species in the fungal genus Epichloë.

A systemic and seed-transmissible grass symbiont first described in 1999, Epichloë glyceriae is an early branching lineage on the Epichloë tree.

Epichloë glyceriae is found in North America, where it has been identified in grass species of the genus Glyceria. Epichloë glyceriae is not thought to be seed transmitted.
