= Festuca magellanica =

Scientific classification
- Kingdom: Plantae
- Clade: Tracheophytes
- Clade: Angiosperms
- Clade: Monocots
- Clade: Commelinids
- Order: Poales
- Family: Poaceae
- Subfamily: Pooideae
- Genus: Festuca
- Species: F. magellanica

Binomial name
- Festuca magellanica Lam.

Synonyms
- Cynosurus magellanicus (Lam.) Raspail in Ann. Sci. Nat. (Paris) 5: 446 (1825); Festuca ovina subsp. magellanica (Lam.) St.-Yves in Candollea 3: 163 (1927); Festuca ovina var. magellanica (Lam.) Hack. in P.K.H.Dusén, Ergebn. Schwed. Exp. Magell. 3(5): 228 (1900); Festuca hystricola (Hack.) E.B.Alexeev in Bot. Zhurn. (Moscow & Leningrad) 69: 352 (1984); Festuca magensiana Potztal in Willdenowia 2: 166 (1958); Festuca ovina var. antarctica Hack. in P.K.H.Dusén, Ergebn. Schwed. Exp. Magell. 3(5): 228 (1900); Festuca ovina subvar. dusenii St.-Yves in Candollea 3: 162 (1927); Festuca ovina subsp. hystricola Hack. in Ark. Bot. 7(1): 10 (1907); Festuca ovina var. lamarckiana St.-Yves in Candollea 3: 163 (1927); Festuca ovina var. wilczekii St.-Yves in Candollea 3: 168 (1927); Festuca rubra subsp. corcovadensis St.-Yves in Candollea 3: 291 (1927)

Species of grass

Festuca magellanica is a species of grass in the family Poaceae. It is native to south Chile to west Argentina. It is perennial and mainly grows in temperate biomes. Festuca magellanica was first published in 1788 by Herman Johannes Lam.
