= Melica racemosa =

Scientific classification
- Kingdom: Plantae
- Clade: Tracheophytes
- Clade: Angiosperms
- Clade: Monocots
- Clade: Commelinids
- Order: Poales
- Family: Poaceae
- Subfamily: Pooideae
- Genus: Melica
- Species: M. racemosa

Binomial name
- Melica racemosa Thunb. (1794)

Synonyms
- Melica bolusii Stapf (1900); Melica brevifolia Stapf (1910); Melica caffrorum Schrad. (1821); Melica caffrorum var. elatior Nees (1841); Melica decumbens var. racemosa (Thunb.) Kuntze (1898); Melica ovalis Nees (1841); Melica pumila Stapf (1900)

Species of plant

Melica racemosa is a species of grass that is native to South Africa and Lesotho.

== Description ==
It is perennial and caespitose with culms that are 30–60 centimetres (12–24 in) long. The leaf sheaths are tubular and have closed at one end. The leaf blades are erect, flat and 4–30 centimetres (1.6–11.8 in) long by 1.5–5 millimetres (0.059–0.197 in) wide with smooth surfaces. The membraneis eciliate. It has an open, linear, and secund panicle which is 7–20 centimetres (2.8–7.9 in) long. The main panicle branches are indistinct and almost racemose.

The spikelets are cuneate, solitary, and have fertile spikelets that are pediceled. It has an acute apex with a chartaceous fertile lemma with hairs that are 2 mm (0.079 in) long. The spikelets carry 2–3 sterile florets which are cuneate, clumped, and 2 millimetres (0.079 in) long. Both the upper and lower glumes are elliptic, keelless, membranous, and have an acute apex. The lower glume is 4–8 millimetres (0.16–0.31 in) long while the upper one is 5–9 millimetres (0.20–0.35 in) long. Just like the lower glume, the fertile lemma is elliptic, keelless, and is 4–8 mm long. The sterile one though is glabrous.

The flowers are fleshy, oblong, truncate, have 2 lodicules and grow together. They have 3 anthers with fruits that are caryopsis. The fruit is also have additional pericarp with a linear hilum.

== Ecology ==
Melica racemosa grows on hills and mountain slopes. The flowers bloom from September to April.
