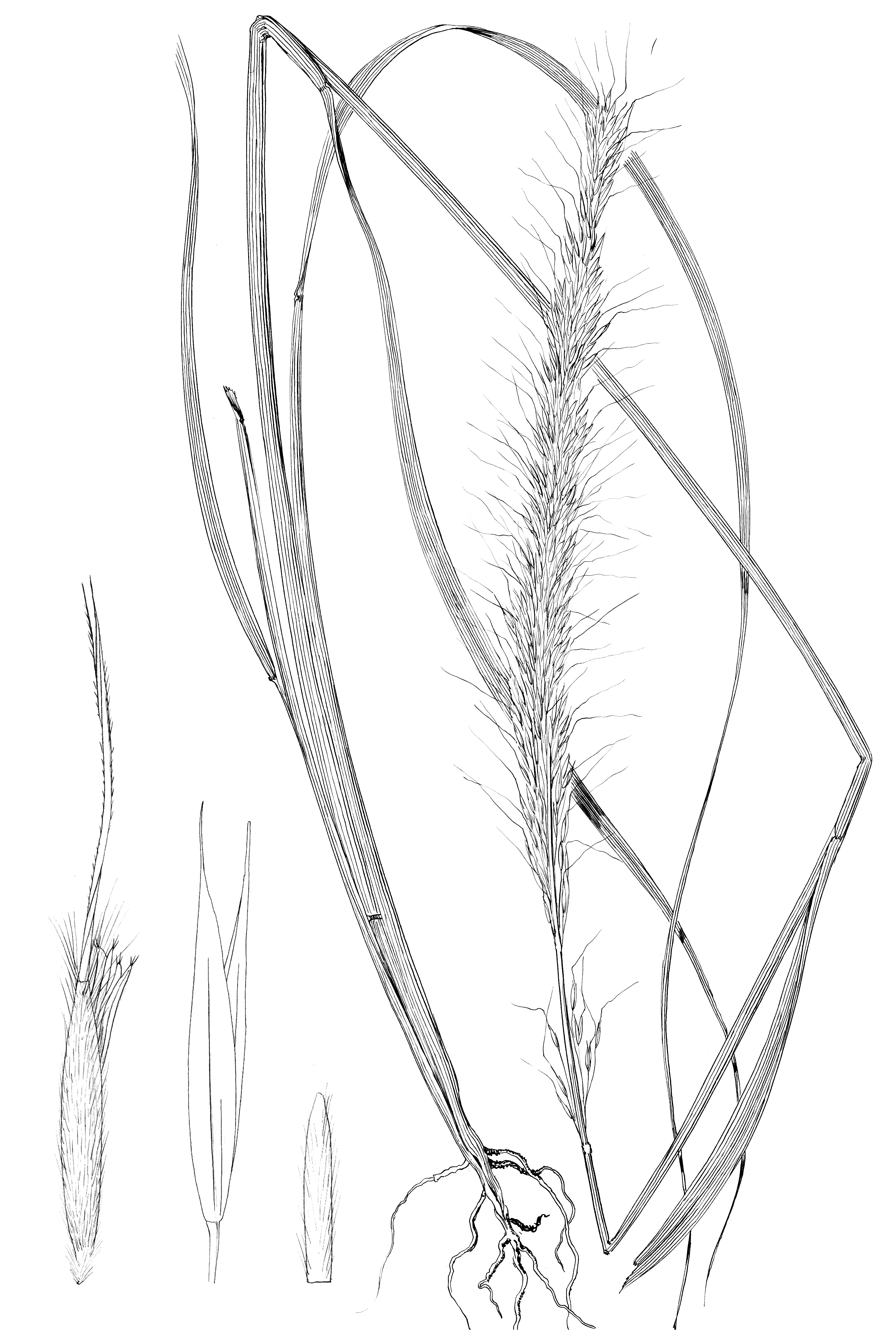
- Line drawing of Achnatherum robustum from Lamson-Scribner's American grasses (illustrated), 1899

Conservation status
- Secure (NatureServe)

Scientific classification
- Kingdom: Plantae
- Clade: Tracheophytes
- Clade: Angiosperms
- Clade: Monocots
- Clade: Commelinids
- Order: Poales
- Family: Poaceae
- Subfamily: Pooideae
- Genus: Achnatherum
- Species: A. robustum

Binomial name
- Achnatherum robustum (Vasey) Barkworth

= Achnatherum robustum =

Sleepy grass

Species of flowering plant

Achnatherum robustum, commonly known as sleepy grass, (synonyms Stipa robusta, also Stipa vaseyi subsp. robusta) is a perennial plant in the Poaceae or grass family.

== Distribution ==
It grows on dry soil in the U.S. Midwest, ranging from South Dakota, Nebraska and Kansas, Wyoming, Colorado and New Mexico to Texas and Arizona, California and Hawaii.

== Ecology ==
Sleepy grass plants harboring a fungal species (of the genus Neotyphodium), contain ergoline compounds, such as lysergic acid amide (common name, ergine). These compounds appear to be responsible for the sedative effects on mammals when they ingest the infected grass.
