= Festuca argentina =

Scientific classification
- Kingdom: Plantae
- Clade: Tracheophytes
- Clade: Angiosperms
- Clade: Monocots
- Clade: Commelinids
- Order: Poales
- Family: Poaceae
- Subfamily: Pooideae
- Genus: Festuca
- Species: F. argentina

Binomial name
- Festuca argentina Speg

Synonyms
- Festuca cavillieri; Poa argentina

Species of grass

Festuca argentina is a species of grass and a perennial herb; this species has a self-supporting growth form. This species is endemic to Argentina. This species often thrives in mountain slopes. This species was first described in 1935.

== Characteristics ==
Festuca argentina can grow up to 28 centimetres, and has simple but broad leaves. This species can clump to a meter high with a long growth period. This species is poisonous to cattle and goats as when consumed; it causes a condition called huaicú disease, which can interrupt the reproductive system among cattle. This often happens when overgrazing occurs. Due to its appearance, it can stand out amongst many grasses.
