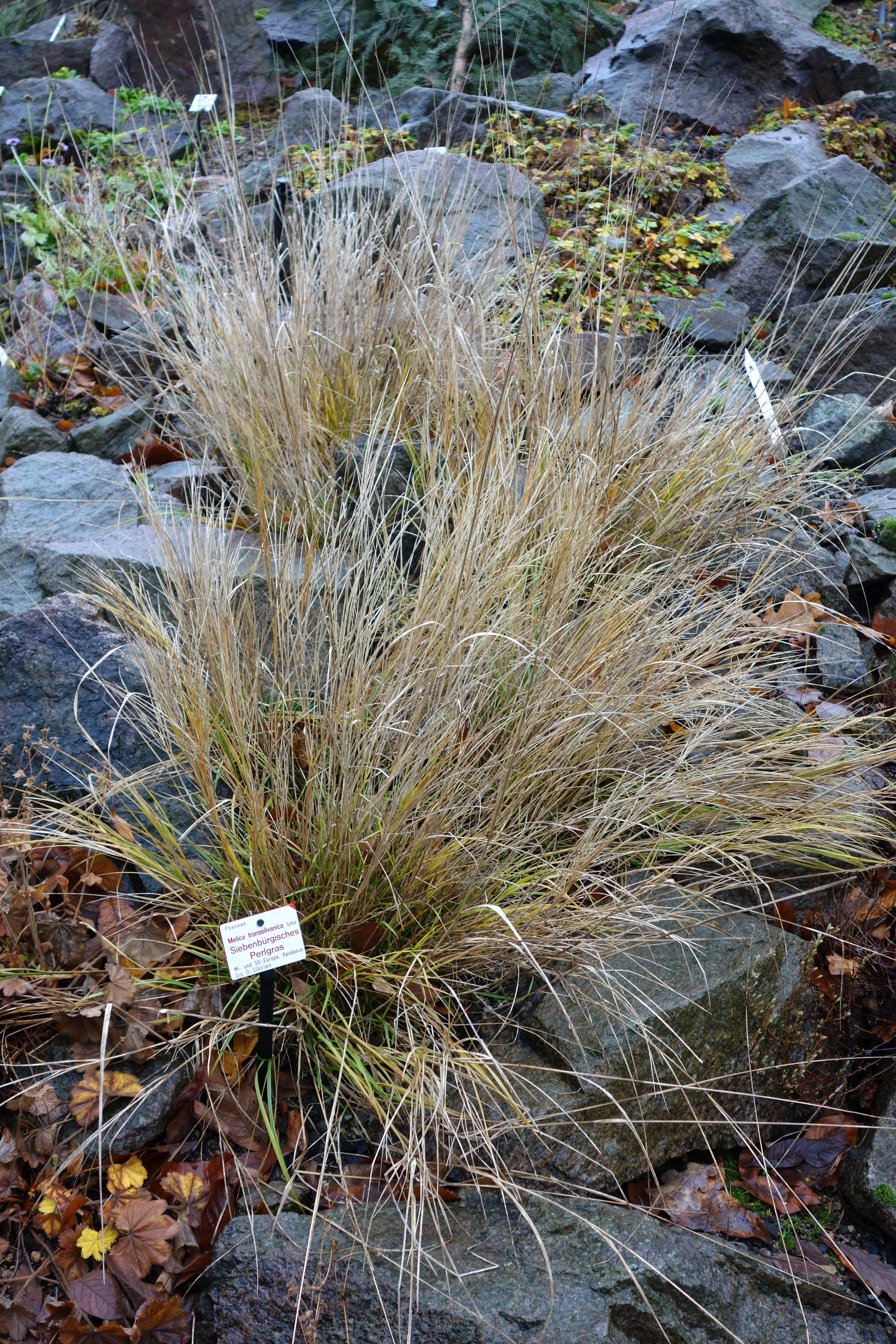

Scientific classification
- Kingdom: Plantae
- Clade: Tracheophytes
- Clade: Angiosperms
- Clade: Monocots
- Clade: Commelinids
- Order: Poales
- Family: Poaceae
- Subfamily: Pooideae
- Genus: Melica
- Species: M. transsilvanica

Binomial name
- Melica transsilvanica Schur

= Melica transsilvanica =

Species of grass

Melica transsilvanica is a species of grass found in Europe and temperate Asia, including Caucasus and China.

== Description ==
The species is perennial and caespitose with elongated rhizomes. It culms are 40–90 centimetres (16–35 in) long with tubular leaf-sheaths which are closed on one of their lengths. Eciliate membrane of the ligule is 0.5 millimetres (0.020 in) long. Leaf-blades are convolute and are 10–15 centimetres (3.9–5.9 in) long by 2–4 millimetres (0.079–0.157 in) wide. They also have scaberulous surface and are rough on both sides.

The panicle itself is dense, open, linear, and is 4–7 centimetres (1.6–2.8 in) long by 1.5 centimetres (0.59 in) wide. The nodes are whorled and are 3–8 centimetres (1.2–3.1 in) long. Fertile spikelets are comprised out of 1 fertile floret which is diminished at the apex. They are also pediceled, the pedicels of which are 1–5 millimetres (0.039–0.197 in) long with spikelerts themselves being oblong and 6 millimetres (0.24 in) long.

Fertile lemma is chartaceous, elliptic, keelless and is 5 millimetres (0.20 in) long. It margins are ciliated while it apex is obtuse. Sterile florets are barren, clumped, cuneate, and grow 2–3 in number. Both the lower and upper glumes are oblong, keelless, membranous, have erosed apexes, and are 5-veined. Their size is different though; Lower glume is 2–3 millimetres (0.079–0.118 in) long, while the upper one is 5–6 millimetres (0.20–0.24 in) long. Palea is 2-veined with flowers being fleshy, oblong and truncate. They also have 2 lodicules, and grow together with their 3 anthers which have fruits that are caryopsis and have an additional pericarp with linear hilum.

== Distribution ==
In central Asia the species is found in Kazakhstan, Kyrgyzstan, Tajikistan, Turkmenistan, Uzbekistan and northern part of Iran. It is also found in Xinjiang, China and Asian part of Russia. In Europe, it is present in such countries as Czech Republic, Germany, Austria, Albania, Bulgaria, Greece, Hungary, Italy, Poland, Romania, and Switzerland. It subspecies Melica transsilvanica transsilvanica is found only in Moldova and Ukraine.

== Ecology ==
The species is scattered throughout forested areas where it margins prefer closed vegetation. It grows on limestone, sandstone, basalt, granite, gypsum, porphyry, and talus.

== Habitat ==
It is found on the elevation of 800–2,000 metres (2,600–6,600 ft) on hills, steppes and other dry places.
