= Melica stuckertii =

Scientific classification
- Kingdom: Plantae
- Clade: Tracheophytes
- Clade: Angiosperms
- Clade: Monocots
- Clade: Commelinids
- Order: Poales
- Family: Poaceae
- Subfamily: Pooideae
- Genus: Melica
- Species: M. stuckertii

Binomial name
- Melica stuckertii Hack.

Species of grass

Melica stuckertii, is a grass species in the family Poaceae that is endemic to Argentina and southern South America.

== Description ==
The species is perennial and have short rhizomes. It culms are erected and are 50–70 centimetres (20–28 in) long. It eciliate membrane is 0.5–5 millimetres (0.020–0.197 in) long and is also lacerated. The leaf-blades are tubular, flat and are 1.5–15 millimetres (0.059–0.591 in) long by 1.5–3 millimetres (0.059–0.118 in) wide with its surface and margins being scabrous. The panicle itself is open, pyramidal, and is 5–25 centimetres (2.0–9.8 in) long. Both panicle axis and branches are scaberulous with solitary spikelets. The spikelets themselves are obovate and are 7–11 millimetres (0.28–0.43 in) long. They carry 1 fertile floret with it callus being glabrous. Fertile spikelets are pediceled, the pedicels of which are curved, ciliate, hairy, and filiform. Florets are diminished at the apex.

Its lemma have ciliated margins that have a hairy middle. It fertile lemma is chartaceous, lanceolate, and is 5–7 millimetres (0.20–0.28 in) long by 2–2.5 millimetres (0.079–0.098 in) wide. It sterile lemma though is truncate. The glumes are all keelless but are different in size and texture. Lower glume is obovate and is 7–11 millimetres (0.28–0.43 in) long and 7-11 veined, while the upper one is lanceolate and is 5–8 millimetres (0.20–0.31 in) long and 5-7 veined. Lower glume also have an acute apex while the upper one have an obtuse one. The upper glumes have asperulous surface as well. Palea have asperulous surface and acute apex and is 3.5–6 millimetres (0.14–0.24 in) long and 2-veined. It also have ciliolate keels with fleshy, oblong, and truncate flowers that have 2 lodicules, and grow together. They also 0.2 millimetres (0.0079 in) long and have 3 anthers which are 1.5–2.5 millimetres (0.059–0.098 in) long which have dark brown coloured fruits that are caryopsis, ellipsoid, and have an additional pericarp with linear hilum. They fruit length is 2.8–3.5 millimetres (0.11–0.14 in).
