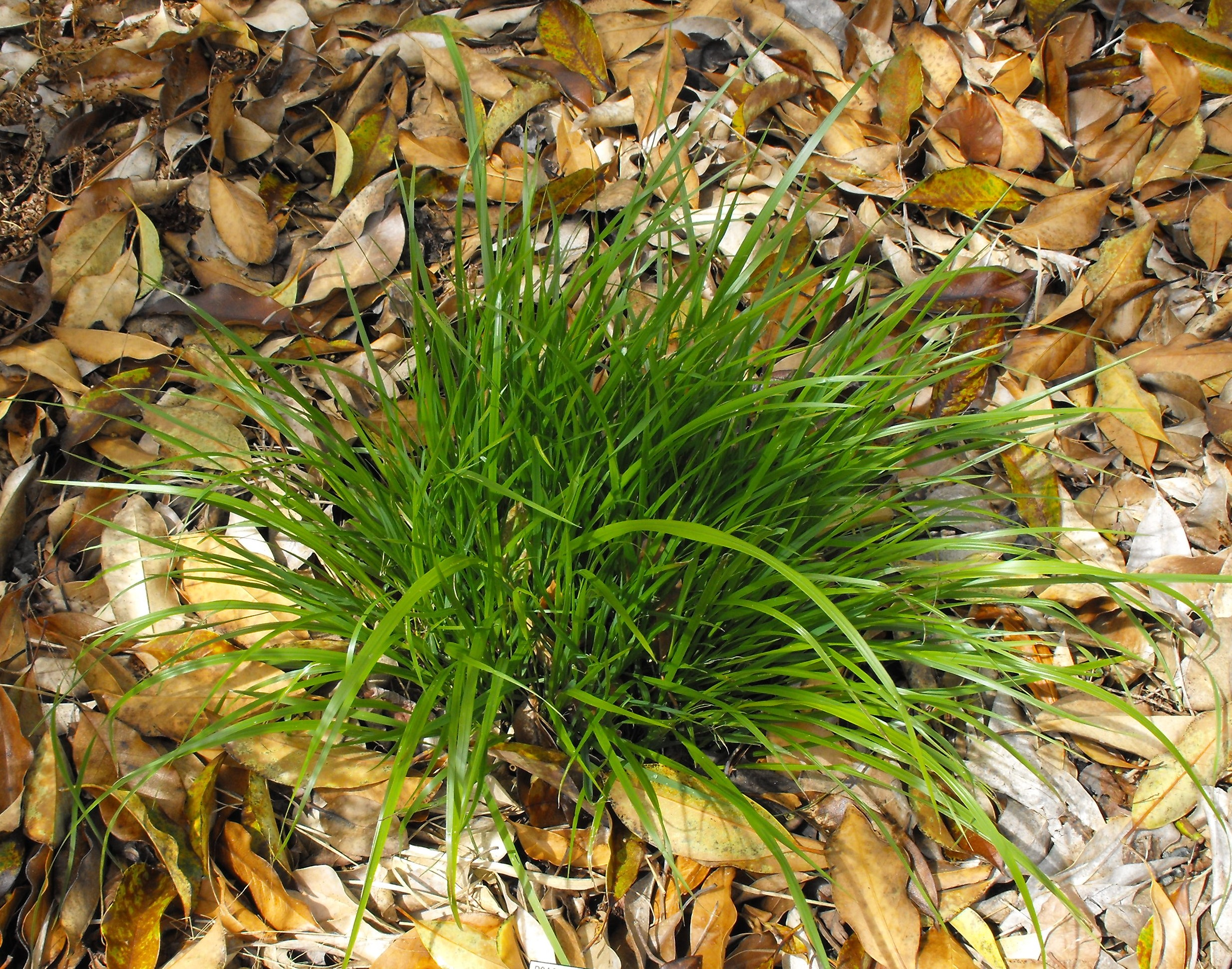

Scientific classification
- Kingdom: Plantae
- Clade: Tracheophytes
- Clade: Angiosperms
- Clade: Monocots
- Clade: Commelinids
- Order: Poales
- Family: Poaceae
- Subfamily: Pooideae
- Genus: Achnatherum
- Species: A. pekinense

Binomial name
- Achnatherum pekinense (Hance) Ohwi

Synonyms
- Stipa pekinensis Hance

= Achnatherum pekinense =

Species of plant

Achnatherum pekinense (Chinese: 京芒草) is a species of flowering plant in the family Poaceae which is endemic to China where it can be found on elevation of 300–3,600 metres (980–11,810 ft) and was introduced to Japan and Korea as well.

== Description ==
The species have culms which are erect and are both 60–150 centimetres (24–59 in) tall and 1.8–3 millimetres (0.071–0.118 in) wide. It spikelets are 8–13 millimetres (0.31–0.51 in) long and are yellowish green in colour. The panicle is 12–40 centimetres (4.7–15.7 in) long and open, while the ligule is 1–1.5 millimetres (0.039–0.059 in) long and is truncate. Plants' lemma is 5–7 millimetres (0.20–0.28 in) long and is pilose, with hairs being 0.6–1.2 millimetres (0.024–0.047 in) long near the awn.
