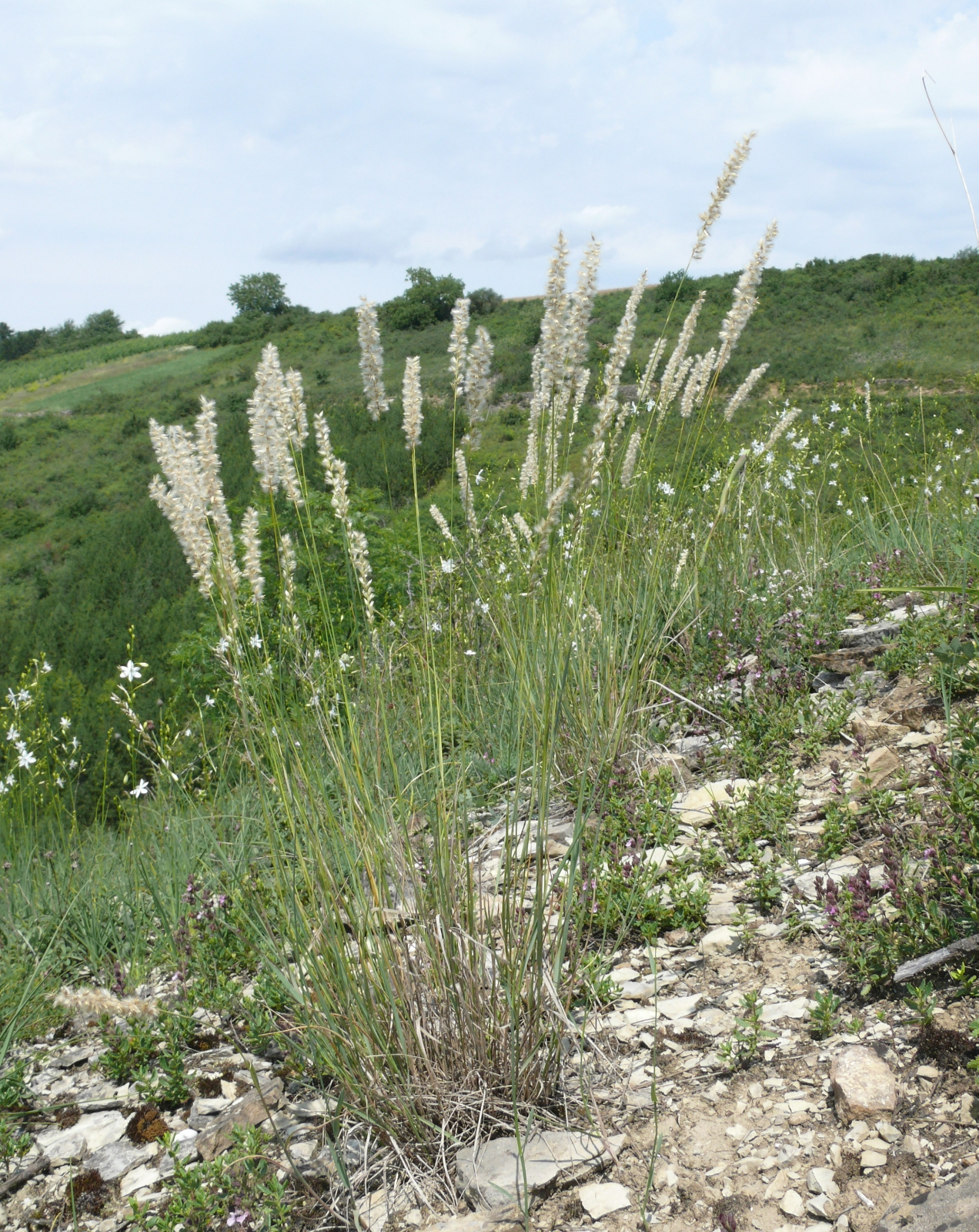

Scientific classification
- Kingdom: Plantae
- Clade: Tracheophytes
- Clade: Angiosperms
- Clade: Monocots
- Clade: Commelinids
- Order: Poales
- Family: Poaceae
- Subfamily: Pooideae
- Genus: Melica
- Species: M. ciliata

Binomial name
- Melica ciliata L.

= Melica ciliata =

Species of plant

Melica ciliata, the hairy melic or silky spike melic, is a species of flowering plant in the grass family Poaceae, native to Europe, north Africa and temperate Asia. It has been introduced to South Australia.

== Description ==
The species is a tufted deciduous perennial with elongated rhizomes. It has erect culms which are 50–100 cm (20–39 in) long. The leaf sheaths are tubular and closed; the ligule is an eciliate membrane. The leaf blades are flat, stiff, and 5–15 cm (2.0–5.9 in) long by 1–3 mm (0.039–0.118 in) wide. Their surface is scabrous and glabrous and the tip is attenuate. The panicle is contracted, reaching 20 cm (7.9 in) in length. The spikelets are cuneate with one fertile floret. The florets are on pedicels.

Both the lower and upper glumes lack keels. They are membranous, ovate, 4–5 mm (0.16–0.20 in) long, and 5-veined. The palea have 2-veined, ciliated keels while the fertile lemma is keelless, lanceolate, with an acute apex and ciliated margins. The lemma is 4.5–5 mm (0.18–0.20 in) long with 7–9 veins. The flowers are fleshy, oblong, truncate, with two lodicules and three anthers. The fruit is a caryopsis.

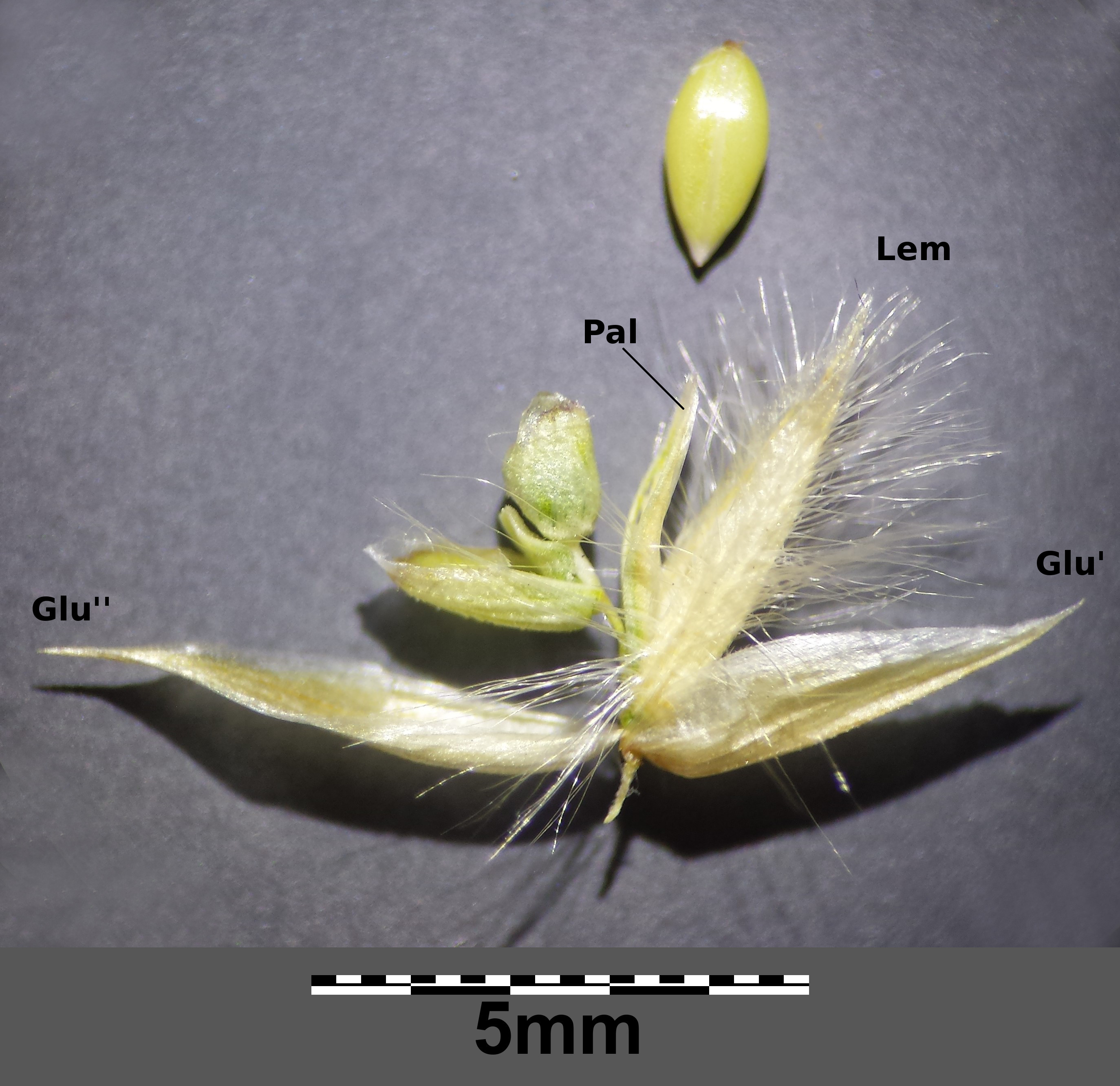
Spikelet
