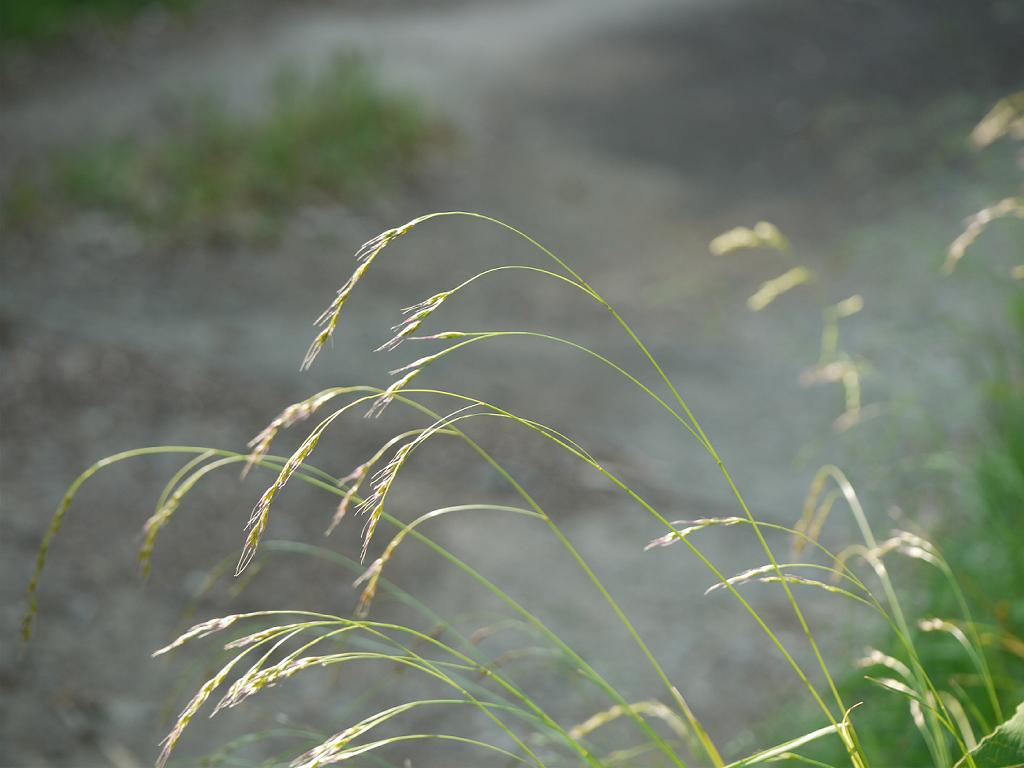

Conservation status
- Least Concern (IUCN 3.1)

Scientific classification
- Kingdom: Plantae
- Clade: Tracheophytes
- Clade: Angiosperms
- Clade: Monocots
- Clade: Commelinids
- Order: Poales
- Family: Poaceae
- Subfamily: Pooideae
- Genus: Festuca
- Species: F. parvigluma

Binomial name
- Festuca parvigluma Steud.

= Festuca parvigluma =

Species of grass

Festuca parvigluma (Chinese: 小颖羊茅; pinyin: xiao ying yang mao) is a species of grass which can be found in Japan, Nepal, both South and North Koreas, China, Taiwan, and Northeast India.

== Description ==
The plant is 40–80 cm (16–31 in) tall and have 2-3 nodes. Leaf sheaths have a hairy base while the leaf blades are flat, 7–20 cm (2.8–7.9 in) long and 2.5–3.8 mm (0.098–0.150 in) broad. They also carry 13-17 veins and have a 0.2–0.5 mm (0.0079–0.0197 in) long and ciliolate ligule. Its panicle is 15–20 cm (5.9–7.9 in) long with branches diameter being 4–13 cm (1.6–5.1 in). The species carry three to 4 (sometimes even 5) florets which are located on 7–9 mm (0.28–0.35 in) long spikelets. The glumes are both ovate and are 2.2–3 mm (0.087–0.118 in) (sometimes 4 mm (0.16 in)) long. Its rachilla is 0.9–1.1 mm (0.035–0.043 in) long while the lemmas are 4.8–7 mm (0.19–0.28 in) and are smooth. It palea have smooth keels while the awns are 5–10 mm (0.20–0.39 in) long (exceeding sometimes up to 12 mm (0.47 in)). The stamens are 0.7–1.1 mm (0.028–0.043 in) but can sometimes reach up to 1.5 mm (0.059 in). It ovary have a pubescent apex with both the flowering and fruit time from April to July.
