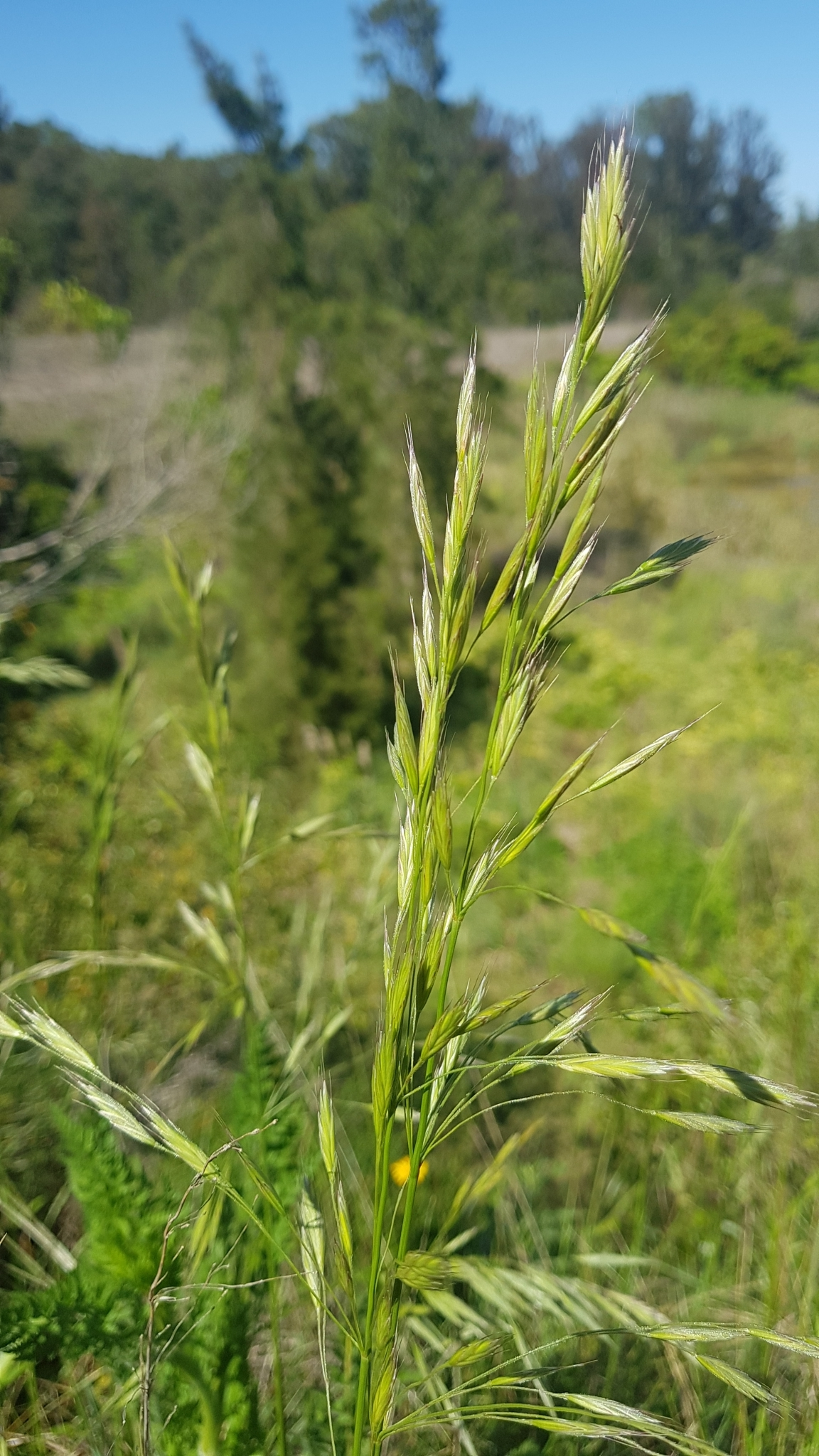
- Bromus Auleticus

Scientific classification
- Kingdom: Plantae
- Clade: Embryophytes
- Clade: Tracheophytes
- Clade: Spermatophytes
- Clade: Angiosperms
- Clade: Monocots
- Clade: Commelinids
- Order: Poales
- Family: Poaceae
- Subfamily: Pooideae
- Genus: Bromus
- Species: B. auleticus

Binomial name
- Bromus auleticus Trin. ex Nees

Synonyms
- Bromopsis auletica (Trin. ex Nees) Herter; Bromus erectus var. auleticus (Trin. ex Nees) Döll

= Bromus auleticus =

Species of flowering plant

Bromus auleticus is a species of flowering plant in the brome tribe, Bromeae, of the grass family Poaceae. It is native to the Pampas of northern Argentina, Uruguay and southern Brazil. It is in the process of being domesticated for fodder use.
