= Epichloë aotearoae =

Scientific classification
- Kingdom: Fungi
- Division: Ascomycota
- Class: Sordariomycetes
- Order: Hypocreales
- Family: Clavicipitaceae
- Genus: Epichloë
- Species: E. aotearoae

Binomial name
- Epichloë aotearoae (C.D. Moon, C.O. Miles & Schardl) Leuchtm. & Schardl

Synonyms
- Neotyphodium aotearoae C.D. Moon, C.O. Miles & Schardl

Species of fungus

Epichloë aotearoae is a systemic and seed-transmissible symbiont of Echinopogon ovatus, a grass endemic to Australia and New Zealand. It was originally described as a Neotyphodium species in 2002 but moved to Epichloë in 2014.

The fungus produces the anti-insect loline alkaloids. Unlike many other anamorphic Epichloë species, E. aotearoae does not appear to be a hybrid. Its closest teleomorphic (sexual) relative appears to be Epichloë typhina.
