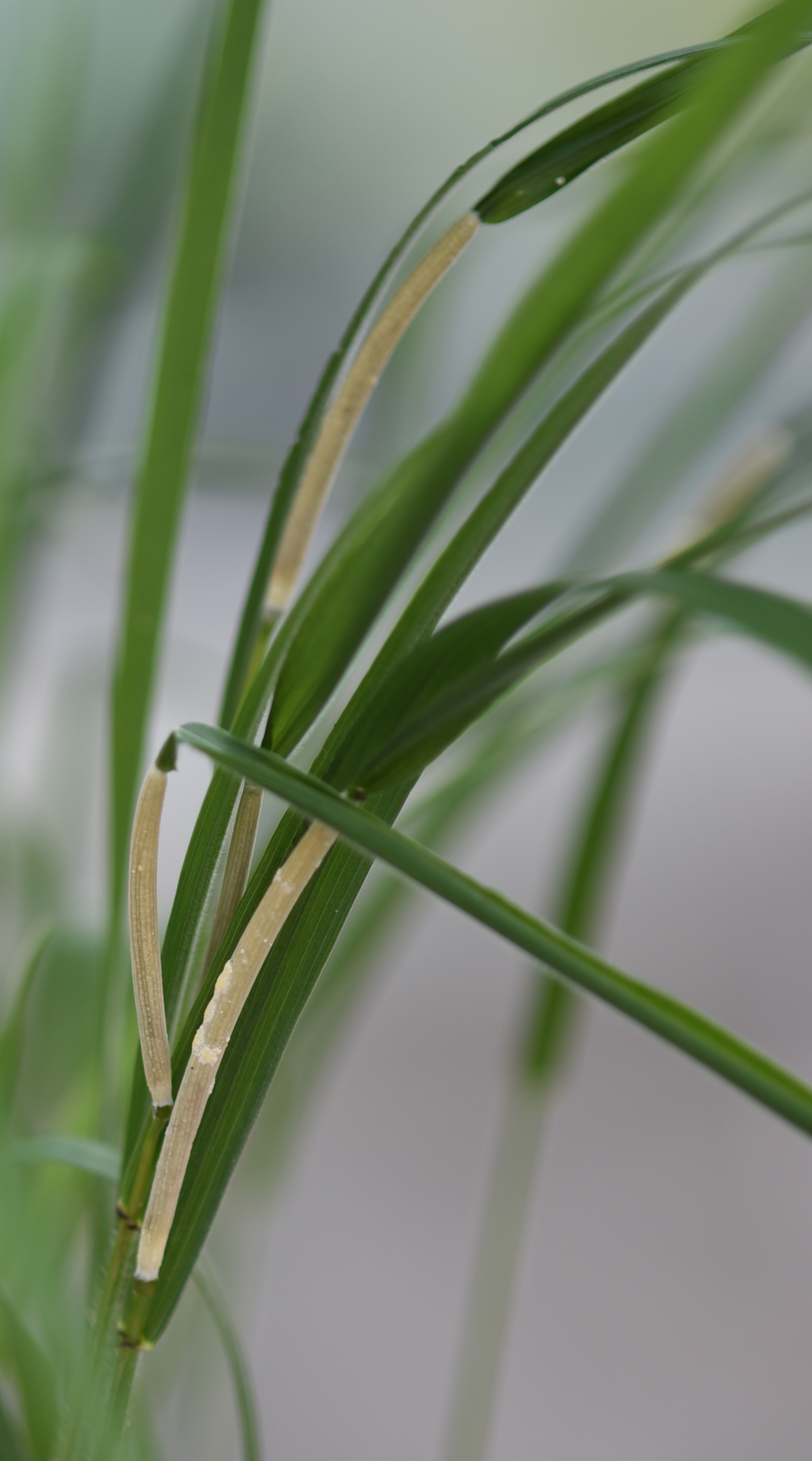
- Epichloë elymi growing on Elymus virginicus

Scientific classification
- Domain: Eukaryota
- Kingdom: Fungi
- Division: Ascomycota
- Class: Sordariomycetes
- Order: Hypocreales
- Family: Clavicipitaceae
- Genus: Epichloë
- Species: E. elymi

Binomial name
- Epichloë elymi Schardl & Leuchtm.

= Epichloë elymi =

Species of fungus

Epichloë elymi is a haploid sexual species in the fungal genus Epichloë.

A systemic and seed-transmissible grass symbiont first described in 1999, Epichloë elymi is a sister lineage to Epichloë bromicola.

Epichloë elymi is found in North America, where it has been identified in Bromus kalmii and some species of Elymus, including E. patula and E. virginicus.
