= Perennial ryegrass staggers =

Perennial ryegrass staggers is poisoning by peramine, lolitrem B, and other toxins that are contained in perennial ryegrass (Lolium perenne), and produced by the endophyte fungus Epichloë festucae which can be present in all parts of the grass plant, but tends to be concentrated in the lower part of the leaf sheaths, the flower stalks and seeds. This condition can affect horses, cattle, sheep, farmed deer and llamas. It regularly occurs in New Zealand and is known spasmodically from Australia, North and South America, and Europe.

== Ecology ==
Perennial ryegrass staggers is caused by the ingestion of grass that is infected by the endophyte fungus Epichloë festucae var lolli, and this fungus produces a variety of toxins such as peramine, a pyrrolopyrazine alkaloid, and lolitrem B, an indole-diterpene compound. There is no external sign when perennial ryegrass is infected by this fungus. The Argentine stem weevil (Listronotus bonariensis) feeds on perennial ryegrass. When the grass on which they are feeding is infected by the fungus, the larvae of the weevil fail to develop fully. In an effort to breed perennial ryegrass that was resistant to the weevil, researchers in New Zealand inadvertently selected strains that were susceptible to the fungus. In fact the endophytic fungus forms a mutualistic association with the grass which grows more vigorously as a result and produces more tillers. With greater use of these susceptible cultivars, the fungus which is present in the seed, spread more widely with a consequent increase in perennial ryegrass staggers.

== Symptoms ==
Symptoms are neurological and may develop one to two weeks after exposure to infected pasture. Symptoms may include head shaking and irregular eye movements, changes in gait, stiffness, staggering and falling. Recumbent animals may display tetanic spasms and may die through misadventure, dehydration, starvation, loss of rumen function or predation. In the case of horses, the animal may quiver or tremble, be easily startled and be awkward to handle. More severely affected animals may repeatedly nod their head, show a tendency to splay their legs, and stumble and fall. The hind-quarters, moreover, may become paralysed.

== Treatment ==
Recovery usually occurs when the animal is removed from the contaminated pasture. The chief danger to stock at this stage is caused by their lack of coordination, which may result in accidental death by falling in awkward places such as ditches and ponds.

== Prevention ==
The disease is particularly prevalent in New Zealand. It may be prevented by avoiding grazing pastures containing perennial ryegrass, or seeding pastures with resistant strains of ryegrass. Horses are particularly prone to this disease because of their habit of biting close to the ground, and sparse pastures may encourage heavier grazing with greater intake of infected material. Supplementary feeding may help, but hay from infected pasture should not be used because it may contain further toxins.
