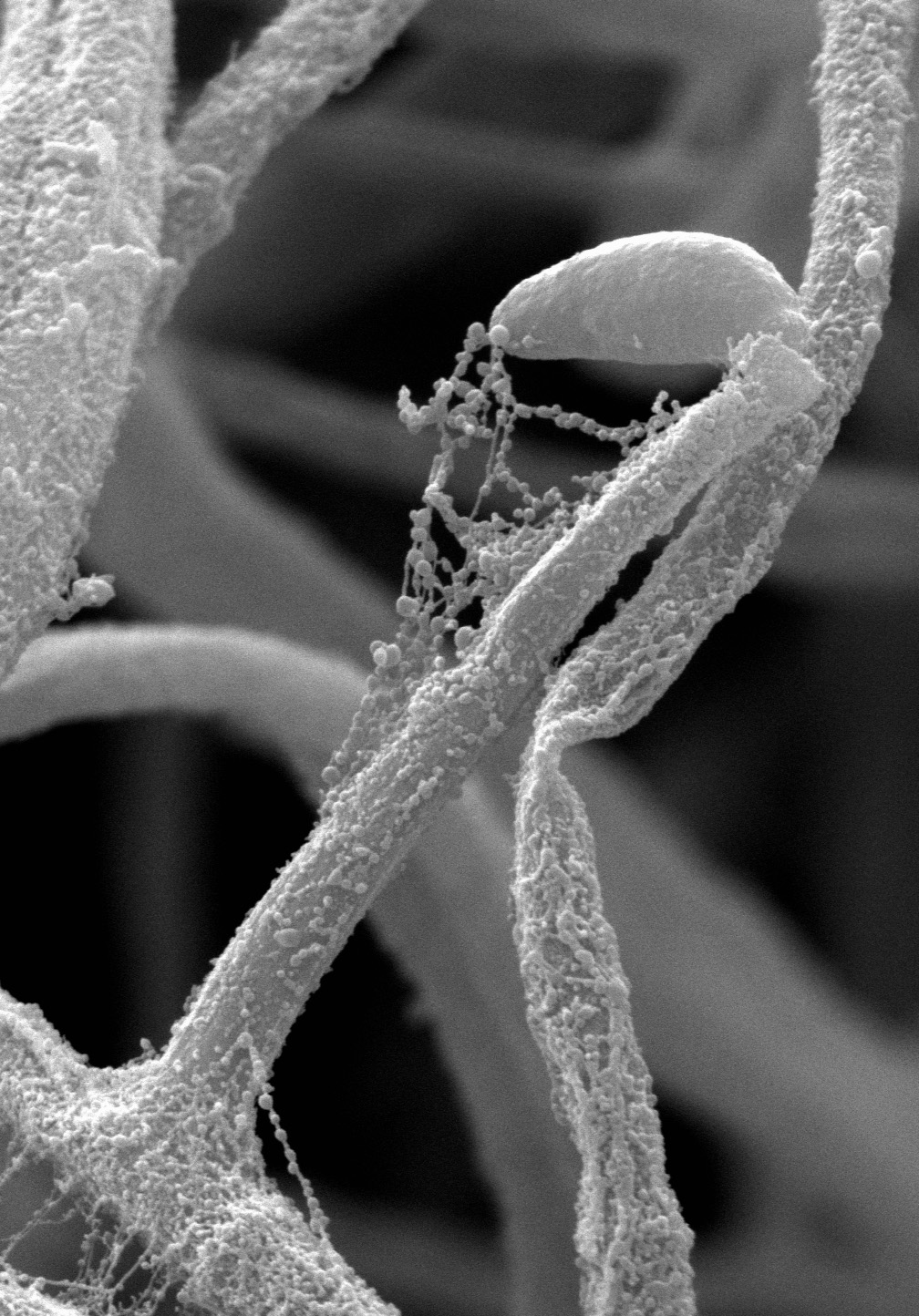

Scientific classification
- Kingdom: Fungi
- Division: Ascomycota
- Class: Sordariomycetes
- Order: Hypocreales
- Family: Clavicipitaceae
- Genus: Epichloë
- Species: E. hybrida

Binomial name
- Epichloë hybrida M.P.Cox & M.A.Campbell

= Epichloë hybrida =

Species of fungus

Epichloë hybrida is a systemic, asexual and seed-transmissible endophyte of perennial ryegrass (Lolium perenne L.) within the genus Epichloë. An interspecies allopolyploid of two haploid parent species Epichloë typhina and Epichloë festucae var. lolii (previously classified as Neotyphodium lolii), E. hybrida was first identified in 1989, recognized as an interspecific hybrid in 1994, but only formally named in 2017. Previously this species was often informally called Epichloë typhina x Epichloë festucae var. lolii, or referenced by the identifier of its most well-studied strain, Lp1. Epichloë hybrida is a symbiont of perennial ryegrass where its presence is almost entirely asymptomatic. The species has been commercialized for the benefits of its anti-insect compounds in a pasture setting, although it is now more commonly used as an experimental model system for studying interspecific hybridization in fungi.

The type specimen of E. hybrida is held in the American Type Culture Collection under holotype accession number TSD-66.

== Hybrid status ==
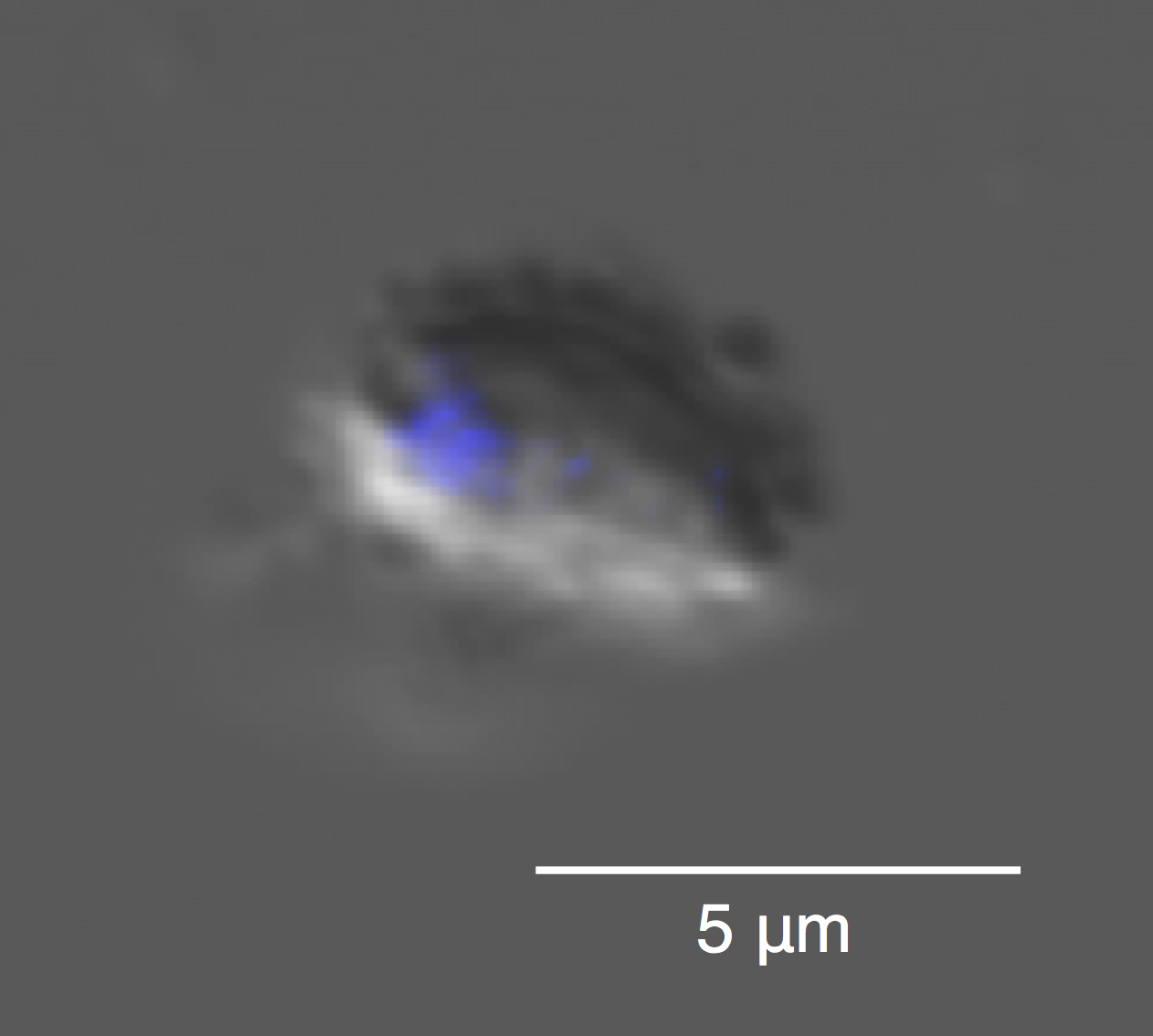
A conidium of Epichloë hybrida Lp1 stained with DAPI (4',6-diamidino-2-phenylindole) showing that each cell contains only a single nucleus.

The genus Epichloë is characterized by the frequent formation of interspecific, typically asexual, allopolyploid species that are commonly referred to as hybrids. Haploid, sexual Epichloë species usually carry only one homeolog ('gene copy') at a given genetic locus, but interspecific hybrids were originally identified by the presence of two or three homeologs, indicating their origin from two or three different parent species. As of 2016, Epichloë had the most known interspecific hybrids of any fungal genus. Epichloë hybrida was one of the first Epichloë hybrids identified. Although the date of the hybridization event is not known with any certainty, an upper bound of ~300,000 years has been estimated.

The colony morphology of E. hybrida Lp1 is a compact form with wavy edges, in contrast to the morphology of either parent. Conidia stained with DAPI, which binds to DNA, show only a single nucleus, confirming that E. hybrida is mononucleate and not simply an interspecies dikaryon.

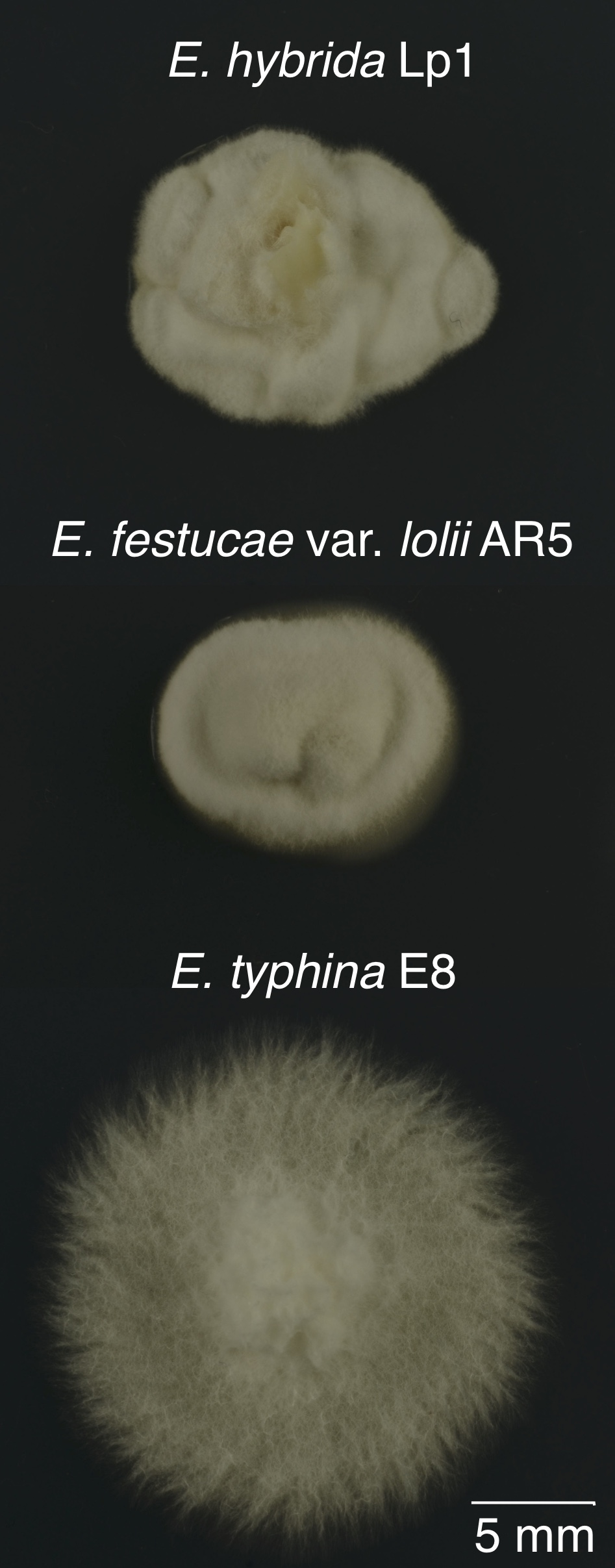
Culture morphology of the interspecies hybrid, Epichloë hybrida, contrasted with two strains from its parent species, E. festucae var. lolii and E. typhina.

== Uniparental inheritance of mtDNA and rDNA ==
With few exceptions, the full complement of nuclear genes appear to be inherited and retained from both parent species. In contrast, the mitochondrial DNA of E. hybrida is derived only from E. festucae var. lolii, while the ribosomal DNA only exists as the E. typhina rDNA sequence type, with the other parental type likely lost through concerted evolution.

In consequence, the ribosomes of E. hybrida likely consist of E. typhina rRNA, but a mix of E. festucae var. lolii and E. typhina ribosomal proteins. Although the presence of divergently evolved ribosomal proteins might be expected to create poorly functioning ribosomes, most E. festucae var. lolii and E. typhina ribosomal protein genes have similar expression levels. It therefore appears that the gene expression of E. festucae var. lolii ribosomal proteins has not been suppressed despite the potential for ribosomal incompatibilities.

== History ==
Epichloë hybrida was first isolated from perennial ryegrass seeds collected as part of a national breeding program funded by the French Ministry of Agriculture in the early 1980s. Run by Gilles Charmet and François Balfourier at the National Institute of Agricultural Research (INRA) in Clermont-Ferrand, 547 natural ryegrass populations were sampled across France by INRA researchers and a national team of ten private breeders. A core collection of 110 accessions, including the E. hybrida source population, was transferred to INRA Lusignan in 2000, where it now forms the basis of the modern French perennial ryegrass breeding program.

Accession F187 was collected in the summer of 1983 by Joël Meunier, an employee of the French breeding company Maïsadour, and as of 2016 was entered into the INRA collection under accession number #010204. The collection site was a natural meadow near the village of Bidache in the French administrative department of Pyrénées Atlantiques in southwestern France. Less than 30 km from the Atlantic coast and under 100 m in altitude, this area has hot summers and mild winters, and is very wet with substantial rainfall throughout the year.

In the late 1980s, the INRA collection was shared with Sydney Easton, a plant breeder in what was then the New Zealand Department of Scientific and Industrial Research (DSIR), and this New Zealand branch of the collection is now housed in the Margot Forde Germplasm Centre at the AgResearch Crown Research Institute. Accession F187 was recoded as accession A6056 at that time.

An endophyte program aimed at systematically isolating agriculturally promising Epichloë strains from this and other ryegrass seed collections was undertaken by Garrick Latch in the late 1980s/early 1990s. A ryegrass seedling from the INRA F187 seed lot was recognized as producing desirable anti-insect compounds. Originally called 187BB, E. hybrida Lp1 was identified in 1989 as the twenty-eighth isolate obtained from the seed batch. This isolate was placed within a group of Epichloë strains known as Lolium perenne Taxonomic Group 2, LpTG-2, which the formal E. hybrida species definition is now expected to encompass.
