= Epichloë amarillans =

Scientific classification
- Domain: Eukaryota
- Kingdom: Fungi
- Division: Ascomycota
- Class: Sordariomycetes
- Order: Hypocreales
- Family: Clavicipitaceae
- Genus: Epichloë
- Species: E. amarillans

Binomial name
- Epichloë amarillans J.F. White

Species of fungus

Epichloë amarillans is a haploid sexual species in the fungal genus Epichloë.

A systemic and seed-transmissible grass symbiont first described in 1994, Epichloë amarillans is a sister lineage to Epichloë baconii, Epichloë festucae, Epichloë mollis and Epichloë stromatolonga.

Epichloë amarillans is found in North America, where it has been identified in many species of grasses, including Agrostis hyemalis, Agrostis perennans, Calamagrostis canadensis, Elymus virginicus, Sphenopholis nitida, Sphenopholis obtusata, Sphenopholis × pallens and Ammophila breviligulata.
