= Lolitrem B =

Names
- IUPAC name (3S,4aR,4bR,5aS,5bS,16bS,18aS,19aS)-5b-Hydroxy-1,1,10,10,12,12,16b,16c-octamethyl-3-(2-methyl-1-propen-1-yl)-1,4a,4b,6,7,7a,9,9a,10,12,12a,16,16b,16c,17,18,18a,19a-octadecahydro-5bH-[2]benzofuro[5,6-e][1,3]dioxino[5,4:2',3']oxireno[4',4a']chromeno[5',6':6,7]indeno[1,2-b]indol-13(8H)-one

Identifiers
CAS Number	81771-19-9
3D model (JSmol)	Interactive image
ChemSpider	2342837
KEGG	C20551
PubChem CID	11947793
UNII	4M63MT6W6M
- InChI: InChI=1S/C42H55NO7/c1-20(2)17-28-47-32-34(38(7,8)48-28)46-27-14-15-39(9)40(10)21(13-16-41(39,45)42(27)35(32)49-42)18-24-29-23-19-25-30(37(5,6)50-36(25,3)4)31(44)22(23)11-12-26(29)43-33(24)40/h11-12,17,21,25,27-28,30,32,34-35,43,45H,13-16,18- 19H2,1-10H3/t21-,25+,27-,28-,30-,32+,34-,35+,39+,40+,41-,42-/m0/s1 Key: HGBZMCXKHKZYBF-WZGHVFPCSA-N
- SMILES: CC(=CC1OC2C(C(O1)(C)C)OC3CCC4(C5(C(CCC4(C36C2O6)O)CC7=C5NC8=C7C9=C(C=C8)C(=O)C1C(C9)C(OC1(C)C)(C)C)C)C)C

Properties
Chemical formula	C_{42}H_{55}NO_{7}
Molar mass	685.8886
- Except where otherwise noted, data are given for materials in their standard state (at 25 °C [77 °F], 100 kPa). Infobox references

Lolitrem B is one of many toxins produced by a fungus called Epichloë festucae var. lolii), which grows in Lolium perenne (perennial ryegrass). The fungus is symbiotic with the ryegrass; it doesn't harm the plant, and the toxins it produces kill insects that feed on ryegrass. Lolitrem B is one of these toxins, but it is also harmful to mammals. The shoots and flowers of infected ryegrass have especially high concentrations of lolitrem B, and when livestock eat too much of them, they get perennial ryegrass staggers. At low doses the animals have tremors, and at higher doses they stagger, and at higher yet doses the animals become paralyzed and die. The blood pressure of the animals also goes up. The effect of the lolitrem B comes on slowly and fades out slowly, as it is stored in fat after the ryegrass is eaten. The condition is especially common in New Zealand and Australia, and plant breeders there have been trying to develop strains of fungus that produce toxins only harmful to pests, and not to mammals.

Lolitrem B affects a kind of ion channel called BK channels. These channels normally open temporarily to allow neurons and other electrically sensitive cells, like some heart cells, to "reset" after they fire; lolitrem B blocks them, preventing the neuron or heart cell from firing again. This affects nerve and heart function. The channel is also involved in blood vessel relaxation, and blocking the channel causes blood vessels to constrict, raising blood pressure.

== Etymology ==
The Lolitrem B toxin derives the first part of its name ('Loli') from the host of the fungus (Lolium perenne), the middle part ('trem') due to the tremors the toxin is known to cause, and the last part of its name ('B') as part of a way to distinguish between different Lolitrems, based on their difference in chemical structure (see 'Chemistry').

== Sources ==
Lolitrem B is found in perennial ryegrass that has been infected with the fungus E. f. lolii (formerly Neotyphodium lolii). This fungus is an endophyte; for part of its lifecycle it lives inside plants, growing between the plant cells; it is most prevalent in the ryegrass stem. The fungus produces lolitrem B, one of several mycotoxins that kill pests but which also can be neurotoxins for mammals.

== Toxicity ==
When animals eat ryegrass stems infected with E. f. lolii they get a condition called perennial ryegrass staggers; in cases of mild poisoning the animals get tremors, and in severe poisoning they stagger and collapse. In horses, tremors of the eyeball muscles are seen which are more severe during eating and exercise. Lolitrem B can also increase the heart rate, blood pressure, respiration rate and disrupt the digestion process. Lolitrems distinguish themselves among tremorgenic neurotoxins because they induce a long lasting effect on motor function and heart rate. The tremors can last for hours and at high concentrations they can cause death. In animals, lolitrem B more often causes death related to unfortunate accidents such as falling in a pond. The neurotoxic effects can be completely reversed.

The threshold for toxicity varies between species of animals: for sheep a threshold value of 1.8 - 2.0 mg/kg was found, and for cattle 1.55 mg/kg. Measuring the lolitrem B concentration in fat tissue can be used to estimate the amount of lolitrem B consumed, and is used to determine the cause of death for cattle that presenting with neurological symptoms. Lolitrem B likely acts synergistically with ergotamine to increase smooth muscle contraction.

== Epidemiology ==
E. f. lolii infects ryegrass worldwide, but cases of perennial ryegrass staggers are rare outside of Australia and New Zealand; the reasons for this are unclear but may have to do with the purposeful selection of endophyte-infected ryegrass by plant breeders, who prize its resistance to pests which are more prevalent in Australia and New Zealand than elsewhere, and the practice of monoculture by farmers in those countries.

== Prevention ==
Plant breeders have been working with mycologists in Australia and New Zealand to develop strains of fungus that produce mycotoxins that are toxic to pests but not to mammals. Until those become commercially established the best prevention is avoiding grazing livestock on ryegrass when the stems are emerging and while the plant is flowering (concentrations are highest in the mature inflorescence and in the base of the plant), and avoiding overgrazing; once the exposure to lolitrem B ends the symptoms gradually decrease.

== Pharmacology ==
Lolitrem B is rapidly eliminated from serum and has a half-life of 14 minutes. Lolitrem B is not very soluble, and is generally stored in fat after ingestion and slowly released; this is likely why its effects come on slowly and linger after ingestion has stopped. The more that is ingested, the more is stored in fat.

Lolitrem B targets the large conductance calcium-activated potassium channels (BK channels) and in particular the α subunit (hSlo) of the BK channels. These channels open temporarily to allow neurons to "reset" after they fire; lolitrem B blocks them, preventing the neuron from firing again after it depolarizes, which at low doses leads to tremors and at high doses to paralysis and death.

The binding site of lolitrem B is likely to be located in this α subunit. When lolitrem B is added, the potassium current quickly gets abolished and this inhibition cannot be reversed by washout (this reversal is possible for paxilline). However, over time lolitrem B slowly dissociates from the binding site. The inhibition by lolitrem B is calcium concentration-dependent. The concentration with half of the maximal inhibition (IC_{50}) for hSlo was found to be 3.7 ± 0.4 nM. Lolitrem B is a more potent neurotoxin in vitro compared to paxilline.

Lolitrem B preferably blocks the open configuration of BK channels, as under high calcium concentrations promoting the opening of BK channels, the apparent affinity increases three-fold. The inhibition by lolitrem B and its affinity differs with the calcium concentration. Lolitrem B has the highest affinity for BK channels when there is a high probability of an open conformation thus when the calcium binds to the high affinity sites. The inhibition occurs when the channels are in an open state.

BK channels oppose vasoconstriction in blood vessels resulting in vasorelaxation. Blocking the channels leads to vasoconstriction and to an increase in blood pressure. The BK channel α subunit is expressed in muscle and nerve tissue and the BK channels are abundant in the brain. The BK channels modulate neurotransmitter release, the form of the action potential and repetitive firing. Inhibition of the channels can explain why there would be an increased release in excitatory neurotransmitters resulting in tremors, ataxia, hypersensitivity, increased smooth muscle contraction in the colon and an increased heart rate.

== Chemistry ==
Lolitrem B is the most potent member of the lolitrem family. It possesses an indole-diterpene unit as well as a reactive epoxide group.

It structurally looks like paxilline which is a related tremor inducer. There are multiple lolitrems which are labelled by a letter. The difference between them is the position and number of aryl and hydroxyl substituents plus the absence or presence of an I ring. The I ring seems to be necessary for prolonged tremors to occur. Intermediate metabolites such as terpendoles and paspaline can become lolitrems by addition of two rings (A and B) at the C20-C21 position to the indole moiety of the molecule.

== Biosynthesis ==
The production of lolitrems – including B – requires 10 different genes on a locus (the LTM locus) which is organized in three clusters. These clusters are separated by large AT-rich sequences. Cluster 1 contains the genes ltmG, ltmK and ltmM. Cluster 2 contains ltmP, ltmF, ltmB, ltmQ and ltmC and cluster 3 ltmE and ltmJ Four genes from cluster 2 are orthologues of functional characterized paxilline genes, meaning that the genes show homologous sequences. The genes in cluster 3 appear to be unique to the Epichloë genus. Much of this research into lolitrem synthesis has been performed by the Young group including Young et al 2005, 2006, and 2009. Young et al 2009 provides predictions of variation in indole-diterpene synthesis ability between Epichloë spp.

== See also ==
- Penitrem A - a structurally related fungal neurotoxin found on ryegrass
