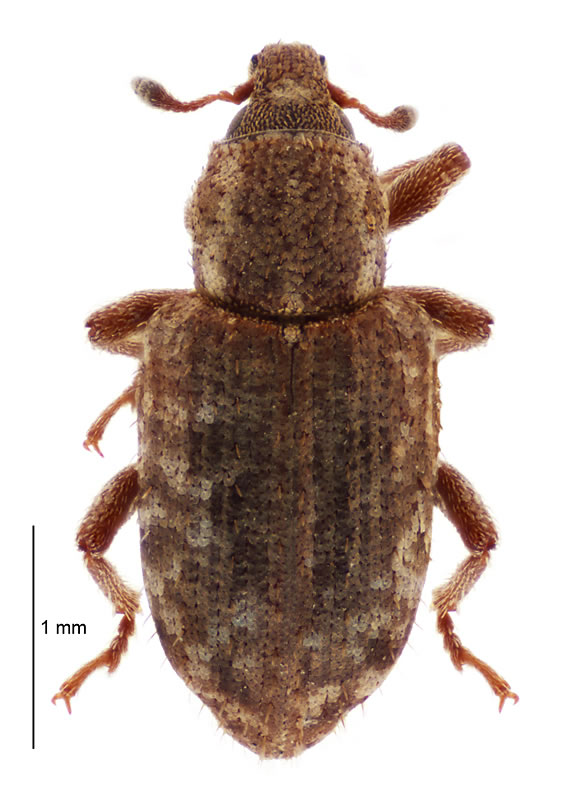

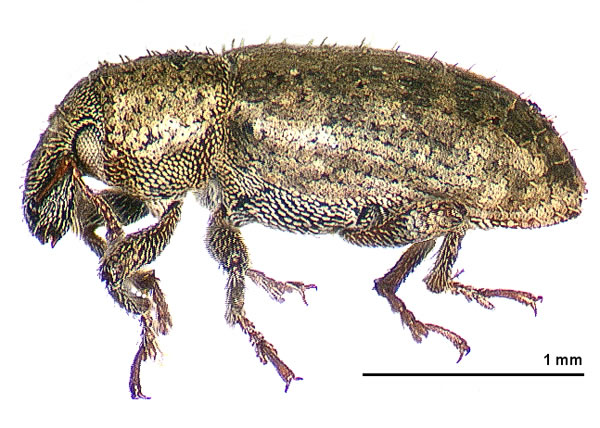

Scientific classification
- Kingdom: Animalia
- Phylum: Arthropoda
- Class: Insecta
- Order: Coleoptera
- Suborder: Polyphaga
- Infraorder: Cucujiformia
- Family: Curculionidae
- Genus: Listronotus
- Species: L. bonariensis

Binomial name
- Listronotus bonariensis (Kuschel, 1955)

Synonyms
- Hyperodes bonariensis Kuschel, 1955

= Listronotus bonariensis =

Argentine stem weevil

Species of beetle

Listronotus bonariensis is a species of weevil that is native to South America and is commonly known as the Argentine stem weevil. It is a pest of grasses and cereals, with the larvae being more destructive than the adult insects. It has spread to Australia and New Zealand, where it is regarded as a pest species.

== Description ==
The Argentine stem weevil is a small grey insect up to 3 mm (0.12 in) long, with a waxy covering. Soil particles adhere to this wax, and while the insect remains stationary, which it often does, this makes it well-camouflaged and difficult to spot. The larvae are cream-coloured grubs with brownish heads.

== Distribution ==
The Argentine stem weevil is native to South America where it is present in Brazil, Uruguay, Argentina, Bolivia and Chile. In these countries it is not considered to be economically important. It has spread to Australia and New Zealand, in both of which countries it is regarded as a pest species. In New Zealand, it is considered to be the most important insect pest in the country, causing a total loss estimated in 1991 to be NZ$78–251 million per year.

== Ecology ==
This weevil feeds on a number of crop plants including perennial ryegrass, on which it is a major pest, Italian ryegrass, other grasses, wheat, barley, oats and maize. The adult beetle cuts small window-like holes in the foliage but the larvae do more damage. Batches of up to five eggs are laid, usually in a single row. The eggs are less than 1 mm (0.04 in) in length and are yellow at first, but darken with age. They hatch after one to two weeks.

In wheat, young plants are often killed by the larvae and plants at later stages of growth are stunted, have smaller root systems and fewer tillers. Attacks are more prevalent in reduced tillage systems because this encourages the growth of wild grasses and weeds which can also act as hosts. Seedlings of maize are also badly affected.

In perennial ryegrass, the eggs are laid on the leaf sheaths and the newly hatched larvae bore into the stem below. As each larva passes through its four instar stages it burrows through the plant and may destroy up to five tillers in the process. It is usual for only one larva to be present in each tiller.

Attempts have been made in New Zealand to biologically control the Argentine stem weevil. The braconid wasp Microctonus hyperodae is a parasitoid of the pest in South America and has been introduced to control it. The wasp has become established in the North Island and appears to be reducing populations of the weevil. Another wasp Microctonus aethiopoides had previously been introduced in order to control the clover root weevil (Sitona lepidus), and it has also been found to parasitize L. bonariensis. Several species of endophytic fungi, especially Acremonium spp., have also been studied with a view to biological control in New Zealand. Their presence inside the crop plant deters egg-laying by the weevil and reduces the damage done by the larvae, however Acremonium lolii renders perennial ryegrass toxic to livestock at some stages of growth, putting them at risk of developing the disease perennial ryegrass staggers.
