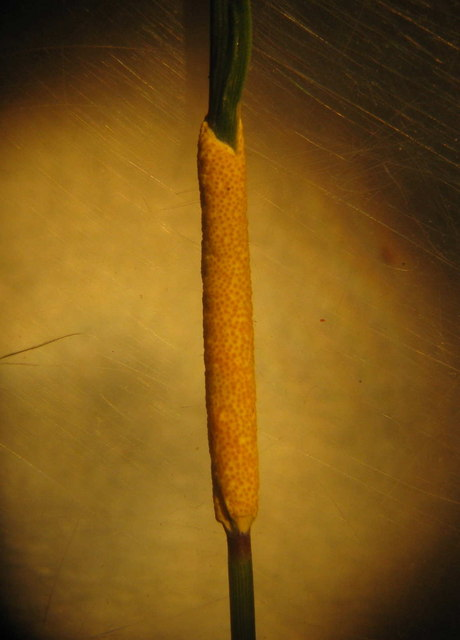
- 'Choking' a grass seedhead

Scientific classification
- Kingdom: Fungi
- Division: Ascomycota
- Class: Sordariomycetes
- Order: Hypocreales
- Family: Clavicipitaceae
- Genus: Epichloë
- Species: E. typhina

Binomial name
- Epichloë typhina (Pers.) Tul. & C. Tul.

Synonyms
- Sphaeria typhina Pers.; Acremonium typhinum var. fasciculatum J.F. White; Neotyphodium typhinum var. ammophilae J.F. White

= Epichloë typhina =

Species of fungus

Epichloë typhina is a haploid sexual species in the fungal genus Epichloë. It was originally described as a Sphaeria species. Today, however, it is classified in Epichloë.

A systemic grass symbiont first described as Sphaeria typhina by Christian Hendrik Persoon in 1798, and transferred to genus Epichloë in 1865, E. typhina forms an only partially resolved species complex within the Epichloë genus.

Epichloë typhina is found in Europe, but has been introduced widely in North America and elsewhere. It lives in association with a large number of grass species from multiple genera, including Anthoxanthum odoratum, Brachypodium phoenicoides, Brachypodium pinnatum, Dactylis glomerata, Lolium perenne, Milium effusum, Phleum pratense, Poa trivialis, Poa silvicola and Puccinellia distans. Epichloë typhina appears to be seed-transmissible only in Puccinellia distans.

== Subspecies ==
Epichloë typhina has two subspecies and three varieties.

Epichloë typhina subsp. clarkii (J.F. White) Leuchtm. & Schardl was first described in 1993. It is found in Europe in the grass species Holcus lanatus. Epichloë typhina subsp. clarkii is sexual, but not seed-transmissible.

Epichloë typhina subsp. poae (Tadych, K.V. Ambrose, F.C. Belanger & J.F. White) Tadych was first described in 2012. It is found in Europe in the grass species Poa nemoralis and Poa pratensis, and in North America in Poa secunda subsp. juncifolia and Poa sylvestris. The sexual form has been observed on Poa nemoralis and Poa pratensis. Epichloë typhina subsp. poae is seed-transmissible in Poa nemoralis and Poa secunda subsp. juncifolia, but not in Poa pratensis.

Epichloë typhina subsp. poae var. aonikenkana Iannone & Schardl was first described in 2017. It is found in Argentina (Santa Cruz) on Bromus setifolius. This variety is seed-transmissible, but the sexual stage has not been observed.

Epichloë typhina subsp. poae var. canariensis (C.D. Moon, B. Scott, & M.J. Chr.) Leuchtm. was first described in 2000. It is found in the Canary Islands on Lolium edwardii. This variety is seed-transmissible, but the sexual stage has not been observed.

Epichloë typhina subsp. poae var. huerfana (J.F. White, G.T. Cole & Morgan-Jones) Tadych & Leuchtm. was first described in 1996. It is found in North America on Festuca arizonica. This variety is seed-transmissible, but the sexual stage has not been observed.
