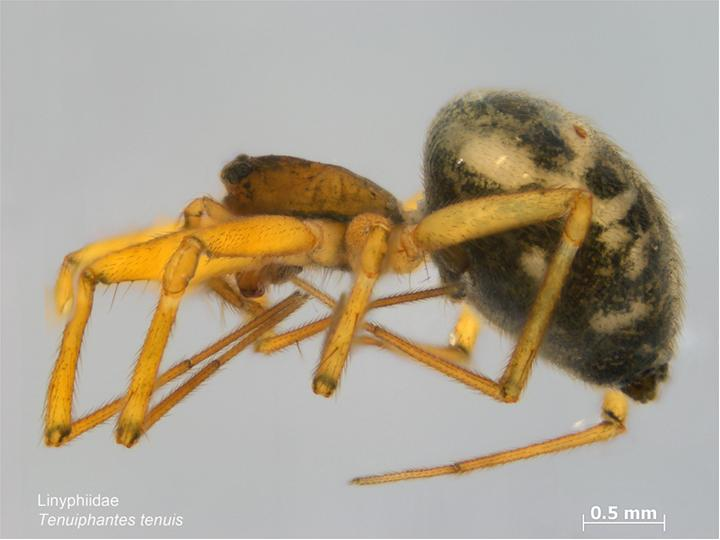

Scientific classification
- Domain: Eukaryota
- Kingdom: Animalia
- Phylum: Arthropoda
- Subphylum: Chelicerata
- Class: Arachnida
- Order: Araneae
- Infraorder: Araneomorphae
- Family: Linyphiidae
- Genus: Tenuiphantes
- Species: T. tenuis

Binomial name
- Tenuiphantes tenuis Blackwall, 1852

Synonyms
- Linyphia pusilla Blackwall, 1834; Linyphia tenuis Blackwall, 1852; Lepthyphantes tenuis (Blackwall, 1852); Lepthyphantes falteronensis Caporiacco, 1936; Lepthyphantes foliatus Denis, 1945; Lepthyphantes aspromontis Caporiacco, 1949; Lepthyphantes sanfilippoi Caporiacco, 1950

= Tenuiphantes tenuis =

Species of spider

Tenuiphantes tenuis is a species of spider belonging to the family Linyphiidae. Its native distribution is reported as Europe, Macaronesia, Northern Africa, Turkey, Caucasus, Central Asia. The species was introduced to USA, Chile, Argentina and New Zealand from Europe where it is found throughout.

The body length excluding legs is about 2 to 3 millimetres (0.079 to 0.118 in). The carapace is dark brown. The abdomen often has a distinctive pattern, usually with clear black spots, and T. tenuis is more slender than other species in the family. The legs are brown and lack annulations.

T. tenuis is usually found in low vegetation, moss, and leaf litter where it feeds on various insects including Listronotus bonariensis.
