= Epichloë mollis =

Scientific classification
- Domain: Eukaryota
- Kingdom: Fungi
- Division: Ascomycota
- Class: Sordariomycetes
- Order: Hypocreales
- Family: Clavicipitaceae
- Genus: Epichloë
- Species: E. mollis

Binomial name
- Epichloë mollis (Morgan-Jones & W. Gams) Leuchtm. & Schardl

Synonyms
- Acremonium typhinum Morgan-Jones & W. Gams; Neotyphodium typhinum (Morgan-Jones & W. Gams) Glenn, C.W. Bacon & Hanlin

Species of fungus

Epichloë mollis is a haploid sexual species in the fungal genus Epichloë.

A systemic and seed-transmissible grass symbiont first described in 1982, Epichloë mollis is a sister lineage to Epichloë amarillans, Epichloë baconii, Epichloë festucae and Epichloë stromatolonga.

Epichloë mollis is found in Europe, where it has been identified in the grass species Holcus mollis.
