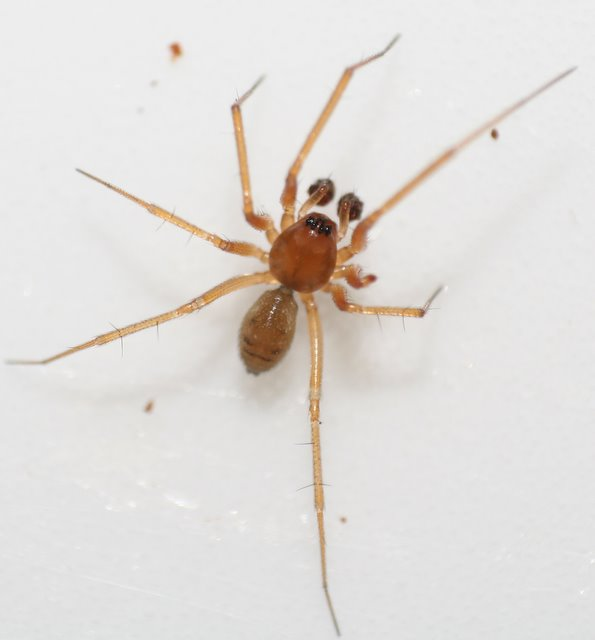
- T. cristatus

Scientific classification
- Kingdom: Animalia
- Phylum: Arthropoda
- Subphylum: Chelicerata
- Class: Arachnida
- Order: Araneae
- Infraorder: Araneomorphae
- Family: Linyphiidae
- Genus: Tenuiphantes; Saaristo & Tanasevitch, 1996

Type species
- T. tenuis (Blackwall, 1852)

Species
- 44, see text

= Tenuiphantes =

Genus of spiders

Tenuiphantes is a genus of sheet weavers that was first described by Michael I. Saaristo & A. V. Tanasevitch in 1996.

== Species ==
As of May 2019 it contains forty-four species, found in Asia, Oceania, Africa, Europe, Argentina, Micronesia, New Zealand, and Chile:

- Tenuiphantes aduncus (Zhu, Li & Sha, 1986) – China
- Tenuiphantes aequalis (Tanasevitch, 1987) – Turkey, Russia, Armenia
- Tenuiphantes alacris (Blackwall, 1853) – Europe
- Tenuiphantes altimontanus Tanasevitch & Saaristo, 2006 – Nepal
- Tenuiphantes ancatus (Li & Zhu, 1989) – China
- Tenuiphantes ateripes (Tanasevitch, 1988) – Russia
- Tenuiphantes canariensis (Wunderlich, 1987) – Canary Is.
- Tenuiphantes cantabropyrenaeus Bosmans, 2016 – Spain, France
- Tenuiphantes contortus (Tanasevitch, 1986) – Russia, Georgia, Azerbaijan, Armenia
- Tenuiphantes cracens (Zorsch, 1937) – North America
- Tenuiphantes crassus Tanasevitch & Saaristo, 2006 – Nepal
- Tenuiphantes cristatus (Menge, 1866) – Europe, Turkey, Caucasus
- Tenuiphantes drenskyi (van Helsdingen, 1977) – Bulgaria
- Tenuiphantes flavipes (Blackwall, 1854) – Europe
- Tenuiphantes floriana (van Helsdingen, 1977) – Romania, Macedonia, Greece
- Tenuiphantes fogarasensis (Weiss, 1986) – Romania
- Tenuiphantes fulvus (Wunderlich, 1987) – Canary Is.
- Tenuiphantes herbicola (Simon, 1884) – Spain, France (incl. Corsica), Italy, Croatia, Albania, Greece, Algeria
- Tenuiphantes jacksoni (Schenkel, 1925) – Switzerland, Balkans?, Turkey?
- Tenuiphantes jacksonoides (van Helsdingen, 1977) – Switzerland, Germany, Austria
- Tenuiphantes lagonaki Tanasevitch, Ponomarev & Chumachenko, 2016 – Russia (Caucasus)
- Tenuiphantes leprosoides (Schmidt, 1975) – Canary Is.
- Tenuiphantes mengei (Kulczyński, 1887) – Europe, Caucasus, Russia (Europe to Far East), Central Asia
- Tenuiphantes miguelensis (Wunderlich, 1992) – Azores, Madeira
- Tenuiphantes monachus (Simon, 1884) – Europe
- Tenuiphantes morosus (Tanasevitch, 1987) – Russia, Georgia, Azerbaijan
- Tenuiphantes nigriventris (L. Koch, 1879) – Northern Europe, Russia, Kazakhstan, China, Japan
- Tenuiphantes perseus (van Helsdingen, 1977) – Russia, Central Asia, Iran
- Tenuiphantes plumipes (Tanasevitch, 1987) – Nepal
- Tenuiphantes retezaticus (Ruzicka, 1985) – Romania
- Tenuiphantes sabulosus (Keyserling, 1886) – North America
- Tenuiphantes spiniger (Simon, 1929) – France
- Tenuiphantes stramencola (Scharff, 1990) – Tanzania
- Tenuiphantes striatiscapus (Wunderlich, 1987) – Canary Is.
- Tenuiphantes suborientalis Tanasevitch, 2000 – Russia
- Tenuiphantes teberdaensis Tanasevitch, 2010 – Russia (Caucasus), Georgia
- Tenuiphantes tenebricola (Wider, 1834) – Europe, Turkey, Russia, China
- Tenuiphantes tenebricoloides (Schenkel, 1938) – Canary Is., Madeira
- Tenuiphantes tenuis (Blackwall, 1852) (type) – Europe, Macaronesia, Northern Africa, Turkey, Caucasus, Central Asia. Introduced to USA, Chile, Argentina, New Zealand
- Tenuiphantes wunderlichi (Saaristo & Tanasevitch, 1996) – Turkey
- Tenuiphantes zebra (Emerton, 1882) – North America
- Tenuiphantes zelatus (Zorsch, 1937) – Canada, USA
- Tenuiphantes zibus (Zorsch, 1937) – Canada, USA
- Tenuiphantes zimmermanni (Bertkau, 1890) – Europe, Russia
