= Epichloë stromatolonga =

Scientific classification
- Domain: Eukaryota
- Kingdom: Fungi
- Division: Ascomycota
- Class: Sordariomycetes
- Order: Hypocreales
- Family: Clavicipitaceae
- Genus: Epichloë
- Species: E. stromatolonga

Binomial name
- Epichloë stromatolonga (Y.L. Ji, L.H. Zhan & Z.W. Wang) Leuchtm.

Synonyms
- Neotyphodium stromatolongum Y.L. Ji, L.H. Zhan & Z.W. Wang

Species of fungus

Epichloë stromatolonga is a haploid species in the fungal genus Epichloë.

A systemic and seed-transmissible grass symbiont first described in 2009, Epichloë stromatolonga is a sister lineage to Epichloë amarillans, Epichloë baconii, Epichloë festucae and Epichloë mollis.

Epichloë stromatolonga is found in Asia, where it has been identified in the grass species Calamagrostis epigejos. Epichloë stromatolonga is not known to have a sexual phase.
