= England Rural Development Programme =

England Rural Development Programme was the instrument by which the UK Department for Environment, Food and Rural Affairs (Defra) fulfilled its rural development obligations in England, as set out by the European Union. It is derived primarily from Council Regulation European Union Regulation No. 1257/1999 and the related successive implementing Commission Regulations (1750/1999 and subsequent amending regulations 445/2002, 817/2004).

== England Rural Development Programme 2000-2006 ==
The England Rural Development Programme 2000-2006 included the following schemes:

- Environmental Stewardship Scheme (introduced in March 2005): Provides funding to farmers and other land managers in England who deliver effective environmental management on their land.
- Countryside Stewardship Scheme (closed to new applicants and superseded by the Environmental Stewardship Scheme): Made payments to farmers and other land managers to enhance and conserve English landscapes, their wildlife and history and to help people to enjoy them.
- Environmentally Sensitive Areas Scheme (closed to new applicants and superseded by the Environmental Stewardship Scheme): Offered incentives to encourage farmers to adopt agricultural practices which would safeguard and enhance parts of the country of particularly high landscape, wildlife or historic value.
- Energy Crops Scheme Provided establishment grants for short-rotation coppice and miscanthus, and aid to help short-rotation coppice growers set up producer groups.
- Farm Woodland Premium Scheme (closed to new applicants and superseded by the English Woodland Grant Scheme): Provided annual financial incentives to farmers to convert productive agricultural land to woodland with the objective of enhancing the environment, improving the landscape, providing new habitats and increasing biodiversity.
- Woodland Grant Scheme (closed to new applicants and superseded by the English Woodland Grant Scheme): Provided grants for the establishment of woodland.
- English Woodland Grant Scheme (introduced in 2005): Provides a suite of grants aimed at sustaining and increasing the public benefits given by existing woodlands and helping to create new woodlands to deliver additional public benefit.
- Organic Farming Scheme (closed to new applicants and superseded by the Environmental Stewardship Scheme): Provided financial help during the process of converting from conventional to organic farming methods.
- Hill Farm Allowance: Aims to contribute to the maintenance of the social fabric in upland communities through support for continued agricultural land use and help to preserve the farmed upland environment by ensuring that land in the Less Favoured Areas is managed in a sustainable way.
- Rural Enterprise Scheme (closed to new applicants): Provided assistance for projects that help to develop more sustainable, diversified and enterprising rural economies and communities with the primary aim of helping farmers adapt to changing markets and develop new business opportunities. It also had a broader role in supporting the adaptation and development of the rural economy, community, heritage and environment.
- Vocational Training Scheme (closed to new applicants): Provided funding for vocational training activities that contribute to an improvement in the occupational skill and competence of farmers and other persons involved in forestry and farming activities and their conversion (i.e. diversification into non farming or forestry activities, or a change from one type of agricultural activity to another).
- Processing and Marketing Scheme (closed to new applicants): Provided support for capital investment in projects aimed at improving the processing and marketing of agricultural products in order to increase their competitiveness in the market place and their added value.

The England Rural Development Programme for 2000-2006 ended on 31 December 2006.

== Further EU legislation ==
Council Regulation (EC) 1290/2005 of 21 June 2005 on the financing of the common agricultural policy provided for the creation of the European Agricultural Fund for Rural Development (EAFRD) for the financing of rural development programmes. Council Regulation 1698/2005 set out four objectives for support for rural development:

(a) improving the competitiveness of agriculture and forestry by supporting restructuring, development and innovation;
(b) improving the environment and the countryside by supporting land management;
(c) improving the quality of life in rural areas and encouraging diversification of economic activity.

to be achieved by means of four axes:

Axis I: Improving the competitiveness of the agricultural and forestry sector
Axis II: Improving the environment and the countryside
Axis III: The quality of life in rural areas and diversification of the rural economy
Axis IV: Leader

Each axis contained a range of measures that may be adopted by Member States.

== Rural Development Programme for England 2007-2013 ==
A consultation on the priorities for the next Programme for 2007-2013 ran from 27 February to 22 May 2006. However, finalisation of the Programme has been delayed due to the EU regulation that would give legal basis to European Council agreement on voluntary modulation, a method of funding which switches money from direct payments to farmers to Rural Development Programmes, having been blocked by the European Parliament.

On 19 March 2007, the European Agriculture Council voted unanimously in favour of a regulation on voluntary modulation tabled by the German Presidency. The European Parliament agreed, on the basis of this text and associated declarations, to lift its 20% reserve on EU rural development budgets for 2007. This enables Member States to proceed to finalising their rural development programmes.

Defra announced a further consultation on the draft England Rural Development Programme 2007-2013 in the context of the Programme's likely overall impact on the environment. The closing date is 5 July 2007. According to this consultation document, the measures proposed for the England Rural Development Programme 2007-2013 are:

Axis I:

- Provision of advisory services to farmers and forest holders.
- Support for the setting up of farm management, farm relief and farm advisory services, and forestry advisory services.
- Modernisation of agricultural holdings.
- Improvement of the economic value of forests.
- Support for adding value to agricultural and forestry products.
- Promotion of cooperation for the development of new products, processes and technologies.
- Support for investment in infrastructure related to the development and adaptation of agriculture and forestry.

Axis II:

- Support for farming in Less Favoured Areas.
- Support for agri-environment schemes.
- Support for non-productive investments in agri-environment measures.
- Support for the establishment of permanent woodland and short-rotation coppice on agricultural land.
- Support for the management of existing woods and forests.
- Promotion of cooperation for the development of new products, processes and technologies.
- Support for non-productive investments in forestry measures.

Axis III:

- Support for farm business restructuring through the development of diversified activities.
- Support for the creation and development of micro-enterprises.
- Encouragement for tourism activities.
- Provision for more and better basic services for the economy and the rural population.
- Support for village renewal and development.
- Conservation and enhancement of the rural heritage.
- Provision of training in support of measures in Axis III.
- Provision of support for skills acquisition and animation with a view to preparing and implementing a local development strategy.

Axis IV:

- Support for Local Action Groups.
- Support for cooperation actions across regions or countries.
- Support for the effective design and implementation of LAG local development strategies.

== Rural Development Programme for England (RDPE) 2014-2020 ==
From 2014 to 2020 Rural Development Programme for England (RDPE) was originally adopted by the European Commission on 13 February 2015. The document follows the format laid down in the Commission Implementing Regulation (EC) No 808/2014. Version 15 was finally modified on 8 June 2022 in a document endorsed by the European Agricultural Fund for Rural Development and Defra.
