= Tenuiphantes sabulosus =

Scientific classification
- Domain: Eukaryota
- Kingdom: Animalia
- Phylum: Arthropoda
- Subphylum: Chelicerata
- Class: Arachnida
- Order: Araneae
- Infraorder: Araneomorphae
- Family: Linyphiidae
- Genus: Tenuiphantes
- Species: T. sabulosus

Binomial name
- Tenuiphantes sabulosus (Keyserling, 1886)

Species of spider

Tenuiphantes sabulosus is a species of sheetweb spider in the family Linyphiidae. It is found in North America.
