= Tenuiphantes zelatus =

Scientific classification
- Domain: Eukaryota
- Kingdom: Animalia
- Phylum: Arthropoda
- Subphylum: Chelicerata
- Class: Arachnida
- Order: Araneae
- Infraorder: Araneomorphae
- Family: Linyphiidae
- Genus: Tenuiphantes
- Species: T. zelatus

Binomial name
- Tenuiphantes zelatus (Zorsch, 1937)

Species of spider

Tenuiphantes zelatus is a species of sheetweb spider in the family Linyphiidae. It is found in North America.
