= Environmental stewardship (England) =

UK agri-environment scheme (2005-)

Environmental Stewardship is an agri-environment scheme run by the Department for Environment, Food and Rural Affairs in England which aims to secure widespread environmental benefits. It was formally launched on 18 March 2005, although the first agreements did not start until 1 August 2005.

If Environment Stewardship is taken up across large areas of the countryside it will help to:

- Improve water quality and reduce soil erosion – by encouraging management which can help to meet these aims;
- Improve conditions for farmland wildlife – including birds, mammals, butterflies and bees;
- Maintain and enhance landscape character – by helping to maintain important features such as traditional field boundaries;
- Protect the historic environment – including archaeological features and artefacts.

The scheme, which replaced the older Countryside Stewardship and Environmentally Sensitive Area schemes, was composed of two levels: the Entry Level Stewardship (ELS), Organic Entry Level Stewardship (OELS) for Organic farms, Upland Entry Level Stewardship (UELS) comprising the lower levels; and the Higher Level Stewardship (HLS) for the upper level.

The scheme closed to new entrants in December 2014 and was replaced by a new Countryside Stewardship scheme (not to be confused with the preceding Countryside Stewardship Scheme). Existing agreements continued after the scheme's closure

== Introduction ==
Entry Level Stewardship aimed to encourage large numbers of farmers and land managers (hereafter referred to as 'applicants') across England to deliver simple yet effective environmental management that goes beyond the Single Payment Scheme (SPS) requirement to maintain land in Good Agricultural and Environmental Condition.

Payouts were from £30/hectare for Entry Level Stewardship to £60/hectare for Organic ELS, and last either five or ten years. The scheme was non-competitive and payments were awarded if the threshold 30 points per hectare was achieved when averaged over the farm.

Applicants were able to choose from a wide range of options (e.g. hedgerow management, low input grassland, buffer strips, management plans and options to protect soils), covering all farming types. Each option will earn 'points' (e.g. 100 points per hectare) towards their points total.

== Applications ==
When applying for ELS, applicants first had to prepare a simple record of features on their farm called the Farm Environment Record (FER). This was done using the Farm Environment Record map supplied by the Rural Development Service (RDS). When applicants requested their pre-filled application forms and maps they were also given a ‘points target’ related to their farm size. There was no minimum holding size for entry into ELS. Applicants had the flexibility to decide how much of each option to have, and where to put them, until they had chosen enough to reach their ‘points target’. They needed to mark the location of some of these options on the Options map provided by RDS. If they agreed to deliver enough ELS options to meet their points target they were guaranteed entry into the scheme.

In applying for, and being accepted into, ELS they agreed to: a) identify, map and retain their FER features; b) deliver the options selected in their application form in accordance with the management requirements; and c) adhere to all the scheme terms and conditions contained in the ELS handbook, and in particular to follow Good Farming Practice throughout their farm, and to comply with the other additional requirements.

== Entry Level Stewardship ==
Anyone who owns, farms or manages agricultural land could apply to take out an ELS agreement by contacting the appropriate regional office of Natural England by letter or phone. Online applications for ELS were also available.

Applicants for an ELS agreement received a scheme handbook in addition to the application pack. The handbook detailed the options for management that the applicant could choose to apply on their land. Each option carried a points score, either per agreement (for example for completing the mandatory Farm Environment Record (FER)), per hectare (e.g. grassland management), per metre (e.g. hedgerow management) or per feature (e.g. in-field trees). The scheme was non-competitive, so provided the grand total of the points was at least equal to 30 points per hectare averaged over the farm (i.e. for a 100 hectare farm 3000 points are required) then the application would become an agreement. All agreements were paid at a flat rate of £30 per hectare per year, and last 5 years.

The schemes underwent several revisions since their inception.

== Organic Entry Level Stewardship ==
This was very similar in nature to the Entry Level Scheme, except that it covered organic land only. Most of the options were the same in ELS and OELS, but some that were not appropriate (e.g. reduced artificial fertiliser inputs) were omitted. Like ELS, the agreements last 5 years, but OELS land is paid at £60/hectare. It was possible to combine OELS with regular ELS on farms with a mixture of organic and conventionally farmed land.

== Higher Level Stewardship ==
This was more targeted than (O)ELS, and not all land was eligible. It was designed to offer more support to more active and environmentally beneficial management practices. Unlike ELS it also offered grants for capital works, such as the restoration of traditional farm buildings. All Higher Level Stewardship (HLS) agreements had to be underpinned with basic management from an ELS or OELS agreement, but in contrast to these schemes the agreements lasted 10 years or more. All agreements started at one of four start dates at three-monthly intervals through the year. The first HLS agreements started on 1 February 2006. There was a delay in the launch of HLS as a result of problems with the department's computer system, "Genesis", built by Atos Origin.

The application procedure was largely the same as for ELS but, due to the added complexity and competitiveness of the scheme and its highly targeted nature, a visit from a Natural England advisor was required. The payment received for HLS agreements was dependent on the precise options chosen, rather than a flat rate.

== Upland Entry Level Stewardship ==
This scheme followed the same format as the entry level stewardship schemes. It was launched in 2010, with the first agreements running from 1 July 2010. It replaced the 'Hill Farm Allowance Scheme', a DEFRA and RPA run scheme.

== Management options covered by the ELS, OELS, HLS and UELS schemes ==
- Hedgerow maintenance options. Important for wildlife as shelter and a food source for animals, for example small birds, dormice. A historic and cultural landscape feature, acting as a barrier to livestock. Hedgerows can also act as pollinators for orchard trees, the nectar and pollen also being of benefit to invertebrates such as bees. The management options encourage the practice of trimming the hedgerows less frequently, to allow them to grow, thicken, and bear fruit. There are other requirements such as not trimming during the bird breeding season so that the nesting birds are not disturbed, and not applying fertiliser or pesticides within 2 metres of them, to encourage wildlife biodiversity. The growth and protection of hedgerow trees is also encouraged under these options.
- Dry stone walling maintenance options. Important for similar reasons to hedgerows, including habitat for lichen, mosses and ferns.
- In field trees. Important habitat for animals, lichen etc. Even if the tree is dead it can offer habitat for birds and bats. Management options include not cultivating under the canopy of the tree, which helps to protect its roots.
- Woodland. Options to encourage structural diversity within and at the edges as many wildlife cannot tolerate a simple structure. Also options to let light into the woodland to help the understory develop.
- Historical orchard maintenance and creation.
- Archaeological sites, traditional farmland buildings and designed landscapes such as parkland. Options to help protect and in the case of the buildings and landscape, restore them.
- Buffer strips, field corners, beetle banks and field margins. Uncultivated grass areas, without fertiliser or pesticide application, these offer the growth of habitat for wildlife. They are also used to buffer watercourses, ponds or wild habitat from adjacent fields from intensive agricultural operations.
- Bird seed and nectar bearing crops. The latter for nectar feeding insects such as bees and butterflies.
- Options to encourage the stubble of harvested crops to be left over winter. This provides a winter food source for seed-eating birds, from spilt grain and the seeds of broadleaved weeds. They are also a habitat for brown hares, and early breeding site for ground-nesting birds such as lapwing and curlew.
- Where a winter crop is sown, there is an option to create unsown areas. These are beneficial to skylark birds that nest in vegetation less than 50 cm high.
- Prevention of soil erosion from converting steep slope arable land to grassland, and growing maize crops during the summer.
- Reducing or eliminating fertiliser and pesticide inputs on grassland and arable land, to increase species diversity.
- Maintaining and creating species rich grassland
- Encouraging mixed stock, e.g. sheep and cattle in the same field to encourage species diversity. This is because they graze to different levels, have different trampling effects, and their faeces can attract invertebrates.
- Access footpaths and payments for educational tours around farms.
- Maintenance and creation of ponds

== Objectives ==
Environmental Stewardship had a number of wide-ranging objectives, which included:

- Protection of water and soil
- Prevention of erosion and water pollution
- Flood management
- Wildlife conservation
- Protect archaeological sites and historic features
- Provide public access to the countryside
- Conserve rare traditional livestock breeds and varieties

== Alternative contemporaneous schemes ==
- Single Payment Scheme (SPS) 4.1 – replaced Basic Payment Scheme
- Countryside Stewardship Scheme (CSS) 4.2 – closed 2014
- Environmentally Sensitive Areas (ESAs) 4.3 – closed ?
- Organic Aid/Organic Farming Scheme (OAS/OFS) 4.4
- Energy Crops Scheme (ECS) 4.5
- Farm Woodland Premium Scheme (FWPS), Farm Woodland Scheme (FWS),
- Woodland Grant Scheme (WGS) and the English Woodland Grant Scheme (EWGS) 4.6 – closed 2014
- Hill Farm Allowance (HFA) 4.7 – replaced by Upland ELS
- Other land management schemes 4.8
- Inheritance/Capital gains tax exemption 4.9
- Farm assurance schemes and the Pesticide Industry Voluntary Initiative 4.10
- Nitrate Vulnerable Zones 4.11
- Other obligations 4.12
