= Tenuiphantes zebra =

Scientific classification
- Domain: Eukaryota
- Kingdom: Animalia
- Phylum: Arthropoda
- Subphylum: Chelicerata
- Class: Arachnida
- Order: Araneae
- Infraorder: Araneomorphae
- Family: Linyphiidae
- Genus: Tenuiphantes
- Species: T. zebra

Binomial name
- Tenuiphantes zebra (Emerton, 1882)

Species of spider

Tenuiphantes zebra is a species of sheetweb spider in the family Linyphiidae. It is found in North America.
