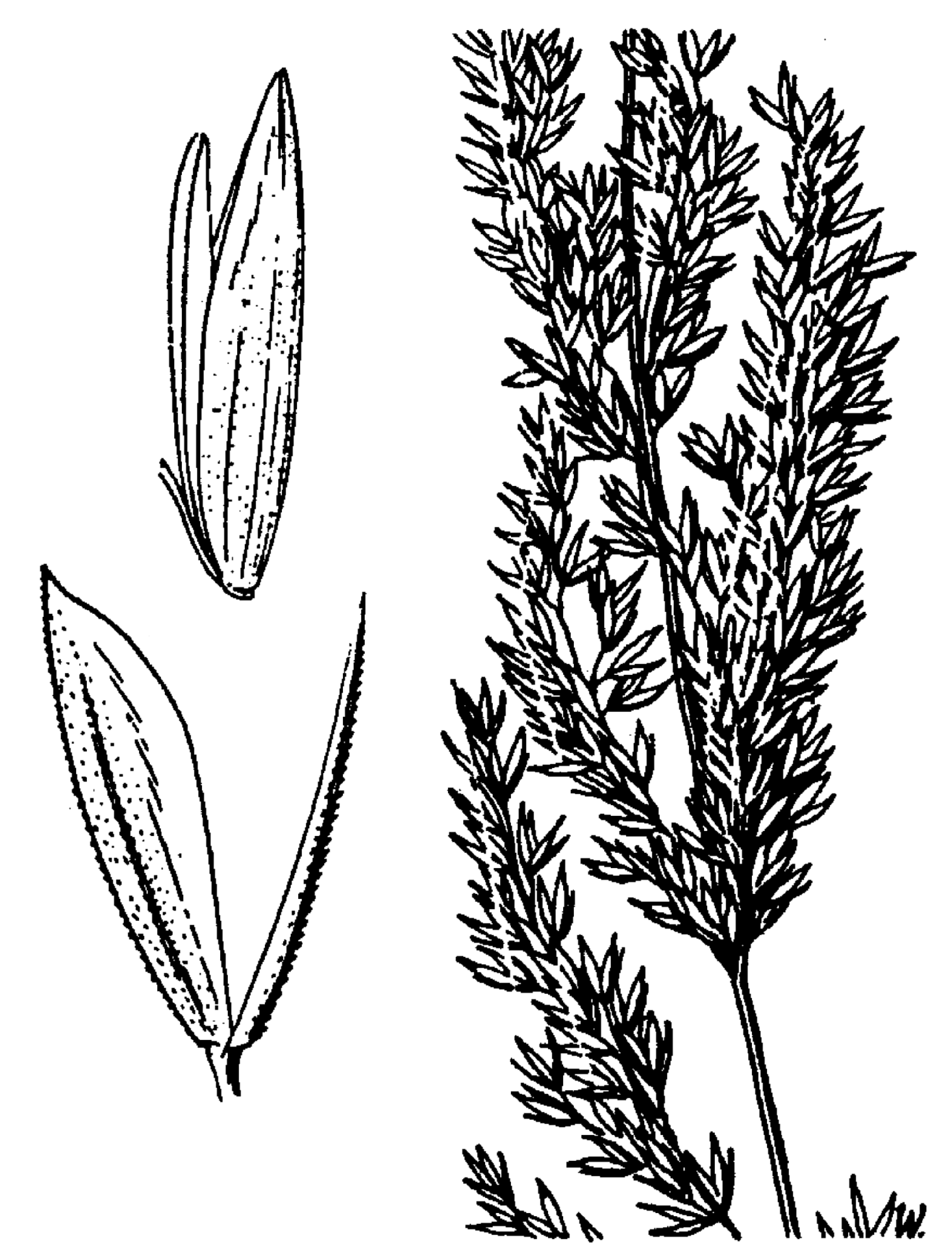
- Illustration of flowering head and florets

Scientific classification
- Kingdom: Plantae
- Clade: Tracheophytes
- Clade: Angiosperms
- Clade: Monocots
- Clade: Commelinids
- Order: Poales
- Family: Poaceae
- Subfamily: Pooideae
- Genus: Sphenopholis
- Species: S. intermedia

Binomial name
- Sphenopholis intermedia Rydb.

= Sphenopholis intermedia =

Species of grass

Sphenopholis intermedia, the slender wedgegrass or slender wedgescale, is an annual grass native to North America. The specific epithet "intermedia" means "intermediate". The diploid number is 14.

== Description ==
Sphenopholis intermedia is a slender grass growing 20–120 cm (8–47 in) tall. The leaf sheaths can be pubescent or glabrous. The ligules are 1.5–2.5 mm (0.06–0.10 in) and often appear erose-ciliate and lacerate. The upper leaf blades are half as long or as long as their sheaths and are scabrous on their nerves. Most leaf blades are 2–6 mm (0.08–0.24 in) broad and flat or slightly rolled.

The lax panicles are 3–20 cm (1.2–7.9 in) long and tend to nod. The spikelets are 3–4.2 mm (0.12–0.17 in) long. The glumes are scabrous on their keels, with the first linear-attenuate and the second oblanceolate. The lemmas are lanceolate and are glabrous except for the most distal lemmas, which become scabrous at their ends. The anthers are 0.5 mm (0.02 in) long. The paleas are thin, narrow, and slightly shorter than the lemmas.

S. intermedia flowers from June into August.

== Distribution and habitat ==
Sphenopholis intermedia occurs in meadows, prairies, shores, and damp slopes at elevations between sea level and 2,500 m (8,200 ft). It prefers wet soils, damp soils that dry after growing season, and clay soils with high water retention. It can be found from Newfoundland to southern Alaska, extending south to Florida, Louisiana, Colorado, and Arizona.
