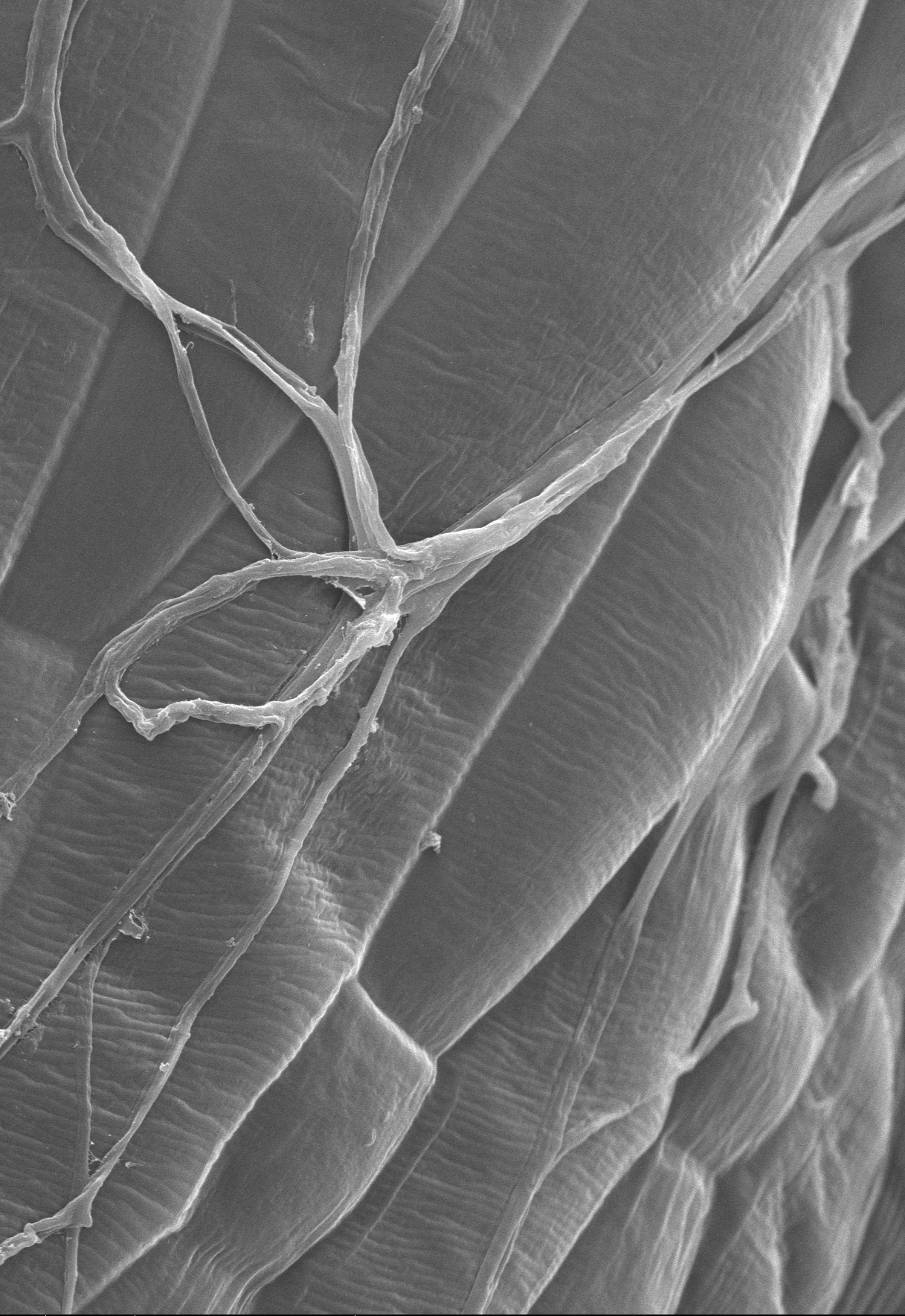

Scientific classification
- Kingdom: Fungi
- Division: Ascomycota
- Class: Sordariomycetes
- Order: Hypocreales
- Family: Clavicipitaceae
- Genus: Epichloë
- Species: E. festucae

Binomial name
- Epichloë festucae Leuchtm., Schardl & M.R. Siegel

Synonyms
- Acremonium lolii (as Acremonium loliae) Latch, M.J. Chr. & Samuels; Neotyphodium lolii (Latch, M.J. Chr. & Samuels) Glenn, C.W. Bacon & Hanlin

= Epichloë festucae =

Species of fungus

Epichloë festucae is a systemic and seed-transmissible endophytic fungus of cool season grasses.

First described in 1994, Epichloë festucae is a sister lineage to Epichloë amarillans, Epichloë baconii, Epichloë mollis and Epichloë stromatolonga. Epichloë festucae is found across North America, where it lives in the grass species Bromus kalmii and Elymus spp. (including Elymus patula).

== Genome ==
The complete genome sequence of Epichloë festucae, the first complete genome sequence of any species in the genus Epichloë, was reported in 2018. The 35 Mb genome comprises 7 chromosomes, ranging from 3.2 to 7.8 Mb, including approximately 9,000 genes.

=== Centromeres ===
As of 2020, although some centromere sequence data is available, full annotation of all open reading frames is not. As a result a full taxonomic analysis is still not possible.

== Varieties ==
Epichloë festucae strains can have both a sexual reproductive morph (teleomorph) and an asexual reproductive morph (anamorph). For this group, the anamorph forms were long classified separately: initially in the genus Acremonium, and after 1996, in the new genus Neotyphodium. Since 2011, the nomenclatural code has required that a single name be used for all stages of development of a fungal species, and following a taxonomic revision of the genus Epichloë in 2014, the asexual forms of Epichloë festucae are now classified as Epichloë festucae var. lolii.

Found across Europe, Asia and North Africa, and introduced in New Zealand, Australia and elsewhere, Epichloë festucae var. lolii is associated with the grass species Lolium perenne subsp. perenne.
