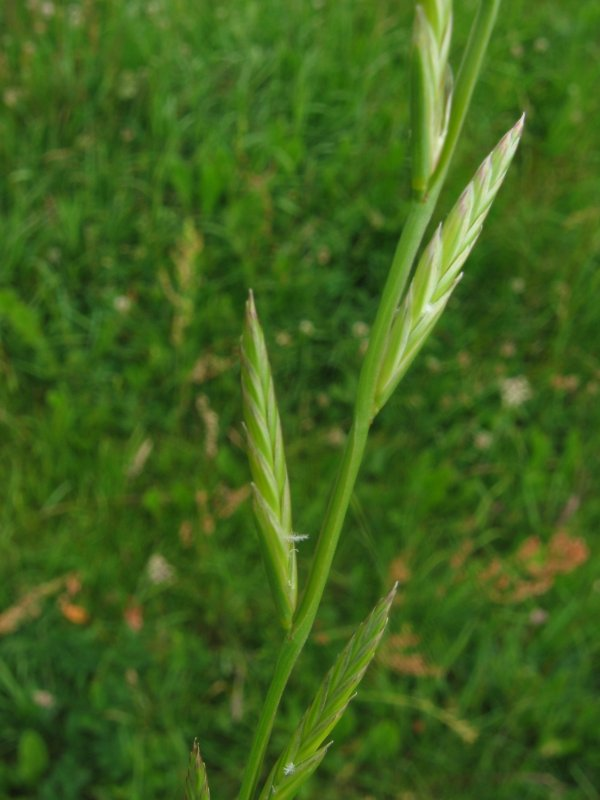

Scientific classification
- Kingdom: Plantae
- Clade: Tracheophytes
- Clade: Angiosperms
- Clade: Monocots
- Clade: Commelinids
- Order: Poales
- Family: Poaceae
- Subfamily: Pooideae
- Genus: Lolium
- Species: L. multiflorum

Binomial name
- Lolium multiflorum Lam.

Synonyms
- List: Lolium ambiguum Desp.; Lolium aristatum (Willd.) Lag.; Lolium compositum Thuill.; Lolium elongatum Rouville; Lolium gaudinii Parl.; Lolium italicum A.Braun; Lolium lesdainii Sennen; Lolium multiflorum subsp. gaudinii (Asch. & Graebn.) Schinz & R.Keller; Lolium multiflorum subsp. italicum (Husn.) Schinz & R.Keller; Lolium multiflorum var. laeviculme Maire; Lolium multiflorum var. latifolium Maire; Lolium multiflorum subsp. ramosum (Guss.) Arcang.; Lolium multiflorum f. submuticum (Mutel) Anghel & Beldie; Lolium osiridis Fig. & Delile ex Rouville; Lolium perenne subsp. italicum Bonnier & Layens; Lolium perenne subsp. italicum Husn.; Lolium perenne subsp. multiflorum (Lam.) Husn.; Lolium scabrum J.Presl; Lolium siculum Parl.; Lolium temulentum Bertero ex Steud.; Lolium temulentum var. multiflorum (Lam.) Kuntze; Lolium westerwoldicum Breakw.

= Lolium multiflorum =

Species of flowering plant

Lolium multiflorum (Italian rye-grass, annual ryegrass) is a ryegrass native to temperate Europe, though its precise native range is unknown.

It is a herbaceous annual, biennial, or perennial grass, depending on the environmental conditions. Italian ryegrass is grown for silage, and as a cover crop. It is also grown as an ornamental grass. It readily naturalizes in temperate climates, and can become a noxious weed in arable areas and an invasive species in native habitats. Resistance to multiple herbicides, including those from the ESPS and ACcase groups, has been identified in wild populations of L. multiflorum.

It is a host plant to wheat yellow leaf virus and ryegrass mosaic virus in its native Europe.

It is sometimes considered a subspecies of perennial ryegrass (Lolium perenne). It differs from L. perenne in its spikelet, which has a long bristle at the top, and its stem, which is round rather than folded.

It can be mistaken for couch (Elymus repens), which has spikelets along the broad side of the stem rather than the edge.

Other common names in English include Australian ryegrass, short rotation ryegrass, and Westerwolds ryegrass. It is also one of several species called darnel.

== Uses ==
Lolium multiflorum is widely used to provide large forage yields in short term leys where persistence of the crop is not a priority. In the United States, Lolium multiflorum is sometimes used as a winter cover crop to prevent erosion, build soil structure and suppress weeds. As a palatable forage crop, it can be grazed by livestock and provide food in years when alfalfa suffers from winter kill.
