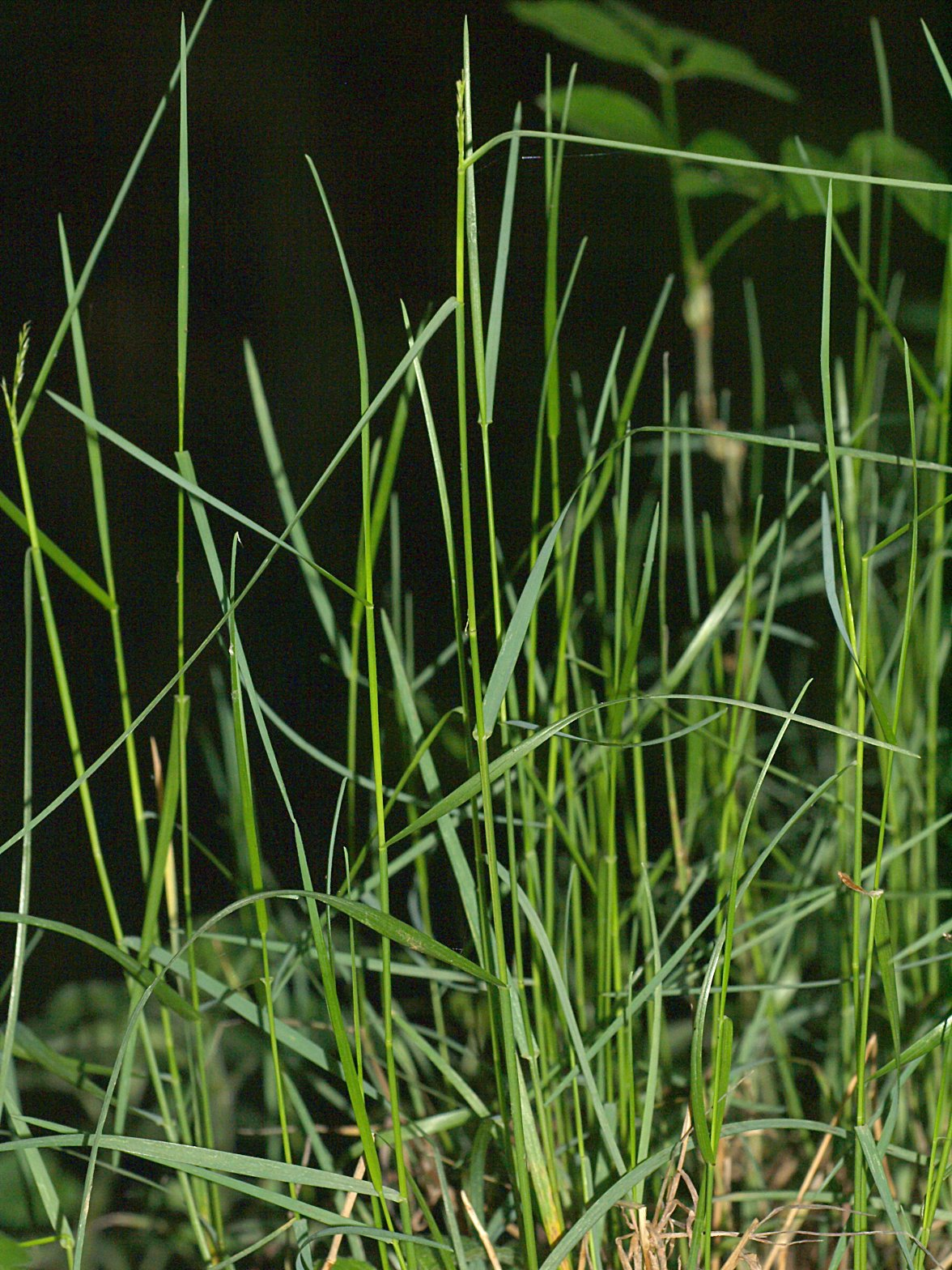

Scientific classification
- Kingdom: Plantae
- Clade: Embryophytes
- Clade: Tracheophytes
- Clade: Angiosperms
- Clade: Monocots
- Clade: Commelinids
- Order: Poales
- Family: Poaceae
- Subfamily: Pooideae
- Genus: Poa
- Species: P. nemoralis

Binomial name
- Poa nemoralis L.

Synonyms
- List: Agrestis alba (L.) Lunell; Agrostis alba L.; Agrostis aristata Sinclair ex Steud.; Agrostis conferta Willd. ex Steud.; Agrostis cremenica Besser ex Steud.; Agrostis disticha Schweigg. ex Steud.; Aira elodes Brign.; Aira helodes Steud.; Aira petraea Bellardi ex Steud.; Catabrosa helodes Roem. & Schult.; Decandolia alba (L.) T.Bastard; Eragrostis tenuis Steud.; Festuca asperrima Hornem. ex Steud.; Festuca depauperata Bertol.; Milium album (L.) Lag.; Paneion nemorale (L.) Lunell; Poa acmocalyx Keng f. & L.Liu; Poa adjarica (Sommier & Levier) A.P.Khokhr.; Poa alexeenkoi (Tzvelev) Czerep.; Poa asperula Steud.; Poa caespitosa Poir.; Poa carpatica subsp. supramontana Bernátová, Májovský, Kliment & Topercer; Poa cinerea Vill.; Poa debilis Thuill.; Poa dubia Suter; Poa eligulata Pavlov; Poa firma Wormsk. ex Roem. & Schult.; Poa firmula (Gaudin) Gray; Poa glaucescens Roth; Poa gracilescens Schrad.; Poa hypanica Prokudin; Poa juncea Suter; Poa juncoides Gaudin; Poa kumgansanii Ohwi; Poa lapponica Prokudin; Poa lapponica subsp. acmocalyx (Keng f. & L.Liu) Olonova & G.H.Zhu; Poa lapponica subsp. pilipes (Keng f. ex Shan Chen) Olonova & G.H.Zhu; Poa lapponica var. turiensis Tzvelev; Poa marginata Willd.; Poa muralis Honck.; Poa nemoralis subsp. alexeenkoi Tzvelev; Poa nemoralis f. glaucantha (Schleich. ex Gaudin) Ghisa & Beldie; Poa nemoralis subsp. hylaea Galanin; Poa nemoralis subsp. hypanica (Prokudin) Tzvelev; Poa nemoralis subsp. lapponica (Prokudin) Tzvelev; Poa nemoralis var. loiseaui Portal; Poa nemoralis var. parca N.R.Cui; Poa nemoralis var. polyclada Portal & Loiseau; Poa nemoralis var. popovii Tzvelev; Poa nemoralis subsp. subpolaris (Kuvaev) Tzvelev; Poa nemoralis var. zhitomirica Tzvelev; Poa parnellii Bab.; Poa pilipes Keng f. ex Shan Chen; Poa polymorpha Wibel; Poa pseudocaesia Schur; Poa pyramidalis Clairv.; Poa rariflora Desf.; Poa recta Willd. ex Steud.; Poa salebrosa Panz. ex Steud.; Poa scheuchzeri Suter; Poa scopulorum Butters & Abbe; Poa subpolaris Kuvaev; Poa tenuis Clairv.; Poa tenuis Elliott; Poa tormentuosa Butters & Abbe; Poa variegata Host ex Kunth; Vilfa alba (L.) P.Beauv.; Vilfa neglecta P.Beauv. ex Steud.

= Poa nemoralis =

Species of grass

Poa nemoralis, the wood bluegrass, is a perennial plant in the family Poaceae. The late-growing grass is fairly nutritious for livestock, which feed on it in the autumn, and it is used as a lawn grass for shady situations.

== Description ==
It forms loose tufts, and is of a more delicate, slender appearance than other meadow grasses. It is slightly creeping. The leaves are narrow, tapering to a point. The ligules are short (0.5 mm). The stem is slender, 30–60 cm (12–24 in) high. The panicle is slender, loose and branched. The spikelets are few and egg-shaped. They have one to five flowers. This grass is in flower from June to August in the Northern Hemisphere. It can produce asexual seeds by means of apomixis and can also reproduce vegetatively.

Because of the characteristic lamina, similar to a stretched out arm, it is sometimes called "Wegweisergras" (signpost grass) in Germany.

== Distribution and habitat ==
Wood bluegrass is native to Europe, where its range extends from Portugal to Bulgaria, and Asia where its range extends from Iran to Japan. It has been introduced in Australia and New Zealand, and to North America where it has become naturalised in southeastern Canada and northeastern United States. Shade tolerant, it is often found in forests and grows up to half a metre tall. It is generally distributed in Britain in dry woods, thickets and shady hedge banks on well drained soils. In its invasive range in America, it sometimes grows in coniferous forests, where its presence is thought to increase the risk of fires, and on floodplains, the banks of rivers and lakes, and disturbed sites. In the British Isles, it is found throughout the United Kingdom but at more scattered locations in Ireland, where it may have been introduced.
