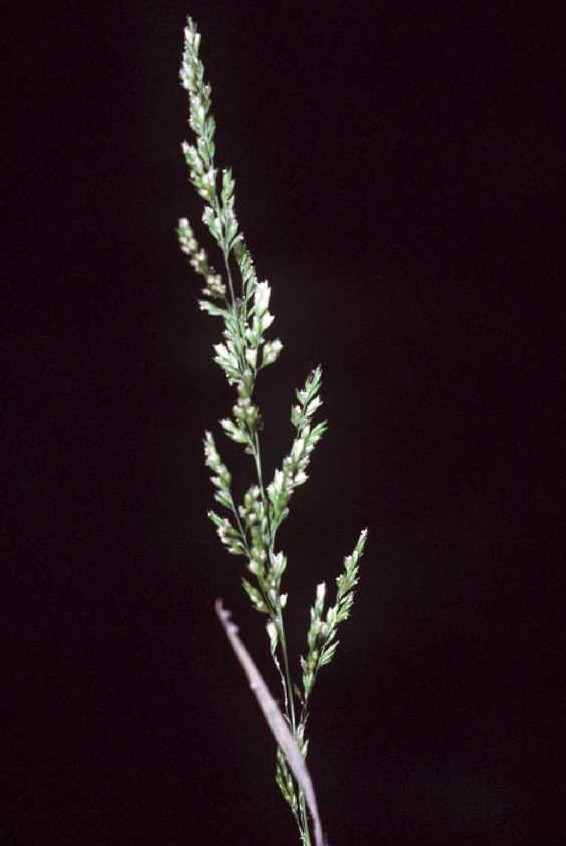
- Sphenopholis obtusata

Scientific classification
- Kingdom: Plantae
- Clade: Tracheophytes
- Clade: Angiosperms
- Clade: Monocots
- Clade: Commelinids
- Order: Poales
- Family: Poaceae
- Subfamily: Pooideae
- Supertribe: Poodae
- Tribe: Poeae
- Subtribe: Aveninae
- Genus: Sphenopholis; Kunth.

Type species
- Reboulea gracilis

Synonyms
- Reboulea Kunth 1830, illegitimate name not Reboulia Raddi 1818; Colobanthus (Trin.) Spach 1841, illegitimate name not Bartl. 1830; Trisetum unranked Colobanthus Trin.

= Sphenopholis =

Wedgescales

Genus of grasses

Sphenopholis is a genus of North American and Hawaiian plants in the grass family.

They are known generally as wedgescales.

Species

- Sphenopholis filiformis - longleaf wedgescale - TX OK AR LA TN MS AL GA FL NC SC VA PA
- Sphenopholis intermedia - slender wedgescale - Canada (every province + territory except Nunavut), USA (every state except California + Hawaii)
- Sphenopholis interrupta - CO OK AZ NM TX LA, Baja California
- Sphenopholis longiflora - Texas wedgescale - TX OK AR LA
- Sphenopholis nitida - shiny wedgescale - Ontario, eastern half of United States
- Sphenopholis obtusata - prairie wedgescale - widespread in contiguous United States + southern Canada, plus Hawaii, Mexico + Hispaniola
- Sphenopholis × pallens - scattered locations in eastern half of USA—hybrid S. obtusata × S. pensylvanica
- Sphenopholis pensylvanica - swamp wedgescale - eastern half of USA
