= Environmental management scheme =

Mechanism for land management

An environmental management scheme is a mechanism by which landowners and other individuals and bodies responsible for land management can be incentivised to manage their environment.

== Schemes by country ==
=== Australia ===
Several schemes (programmes) are or have been in operation in Australia, including:

- National Heritage Trust Funds (1 and 2)
- National Action Plan for Salinity
- Caring for Our Country

Other programmes exist with the various states, for example; New South Wales - Catchment Action Plan

=== United Kingdom ===
Several schemes are or have been in operation in the United Kingdom, including:

- Countryside Stewardship
- Environmentally Sensitive Areas Scheme

Currently England operates the following under the Environmental Stewardship scheme:

- Entry Level Stewardship
- Higher Level Stewardship
- Organic Entry Level Stewardship
- Higher Level Organic Entry Level stewardship

All of these schemes are administered by Natural England.

In 2007, Scotland adopted the SRDP (Scottish Rural Development Programme), a £1.6 billion programme of economic, environmental and social measures designed to develop rural Scotland. Individuals and groups may seek support to help deliver the Government's strategic objectives in rural Scotland.

The former prevailing agri-environment scheme in Wales was Tir Gofal, which means literally 'Land Care'. It was the first scheme Europe, aimed at promoting whole farm conservation and management. It was different from previous schemes, as it brought farming and conservation into a different level of partnership.

Following Britain leaving the European Union, and thus no longer being a part of the Common Agricultural Policy of the EU, the British government initiated Environmental Land Management scheme (ELM) in 2024.

=== France ===
In some countries such as France, such schemes may be initiated by the central government:

- Schéma directeur d'aménagement et de gestion des eaux

=== Switzerland ===
Switzerland started reforming its agricultural policies in 1993 and after a referendum in 1996, since 1998 the country has linked the attribution of farm subsidies with the strict observance of good environmental practice. Before farmers can apply for subsidies, they must obtain certificates of environmental management systems (EMS) proving that they: “make a balanced use of fertilizers; use at least 7% of their farmland as ecological compensation areas; regularly rotate crops; adopt appropriate measures to protect animals and soil; make limited and targeted use of pesticides.”

== See also ==
- Environmental management
