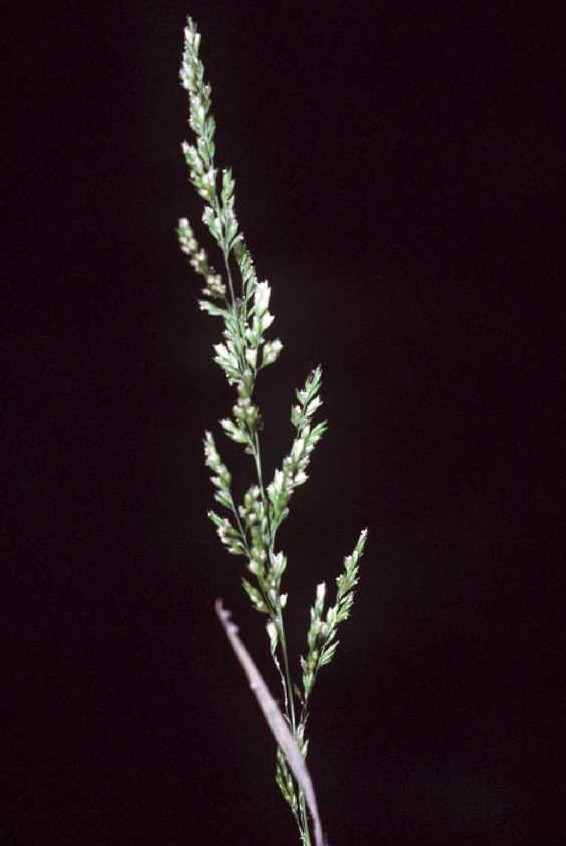

Scientific classification
- Kingdom: Plantae
- Clade: Tracheophytes
- Clade: Angiosperms
- Clade: Monocots
- Clade: Commelinids
- Order: Poales
- Family: Poaceae
- Subfamily: Pooideae
- Genus: Sphenopholis
- Species: S. obtusata

Binomial name
- Sphenopholis obtusata (Michx.) Scribn.

= Sphenopholis obtusata =

Species of grass

Sphenopholis obtusata is a species of grass known by the common names prairie wedgescale and prairie wedge grass. It is native to North America where it is widespread across southern Canada and the United States. It occurs in many types of habitat, including prairie, marshes, dunes, and disturbed areas.

== Description ==
Sphenopholis obtusata is a perennial bunchgrass growing 20 centimeters to well over one meter in maximum height. The short leaves have ligules with jagged tips. The inflorescence is generally a dense, spikelike panicle of oval-shaped spikelets. The inflorescence is greenish white, darkening brownish as it matures.
