= Countryside Stewardship Scheme =

The Countryside Stewardship Scheme was originally an agri-environment scheme run by the United Kingdom Government set up in 1991. In its original form, it expired in 2014. It was relaunched for the Rural Development Programme England (RDPE) 2014-2020 with £3.1bn of government subsidy for agriculture and forestry, replacing the previous Environmental Stewardship scheme.

Countryside Stewardship:

- will contribute around £900 million to help protect and improve our environment.
- will be open to all eligible farmers, foresters and land managers
- is a competitive targeted scheme, with grants awarded to those who will make the biggest improvements in their local area.
- replaces Environmental Stewardship (ES), the English Woodland Grant Scheme (EWGS) and capital grants from the Catchment Sensitive Farming (CSF) programme.

Forestry Commission and Natural England will jointly deliver Countryside Stewardship. Natural England will broadly lead on the set up and delivery of transactional services for Countryside Stewardship for the first year of the new scheme.

== Former CSS (1991-2014) ==
In its first guise, introduced as a five-year pilot project by the Countryside Commission in 1991, the scheme aimed to improve the environmental value of farmland throughout England. The administration of the scheme was taken over by the Ministry of Agriculture, Fisheries and Food (MAFF) on 1 April 1996, and the scheme expanded to include new landscapes and features, including whole farm plans for restoring and recreating traditional walls and ditches, wildlife corridors in arable areas using uncropped margins in arable fields (with management to benefit associated wild flowers and birds), traditional buildings, and old meadows and pastures (important for maintaining and increasing biodiversity). In the meantime, the scheme was incorporated under the umbrella of the European Community's 'agri-environment’ programme which aims to protect the environment and the countryside through the promotion of green farming practices, which enabled grants to be part-funded through the Community. The scheme was incorporated into the England Rural Development Programme on 1 January 2000.

In 2005, there were 16,636 agreement holders with 531,280 hectares under agreement.

The Countryside Stewardship Scheme closed to new applications in 2004 with the introduction of the Environmental stewardship (England) Scheme. Existing agreements continue to be honoured; the last agreements expired in 2014. The scheme is currently administered by staff at Natural England.

== Rural Development Programme for England (RDPE) 2014-2020 ==
From 2014 to 2020, Rural Development Programme for England (RDPE) was originally adopted by the European Commission on 13 February 2015. The document follows the format laid down in the Commission Implementing Regulation (EC) No 808/2014.
