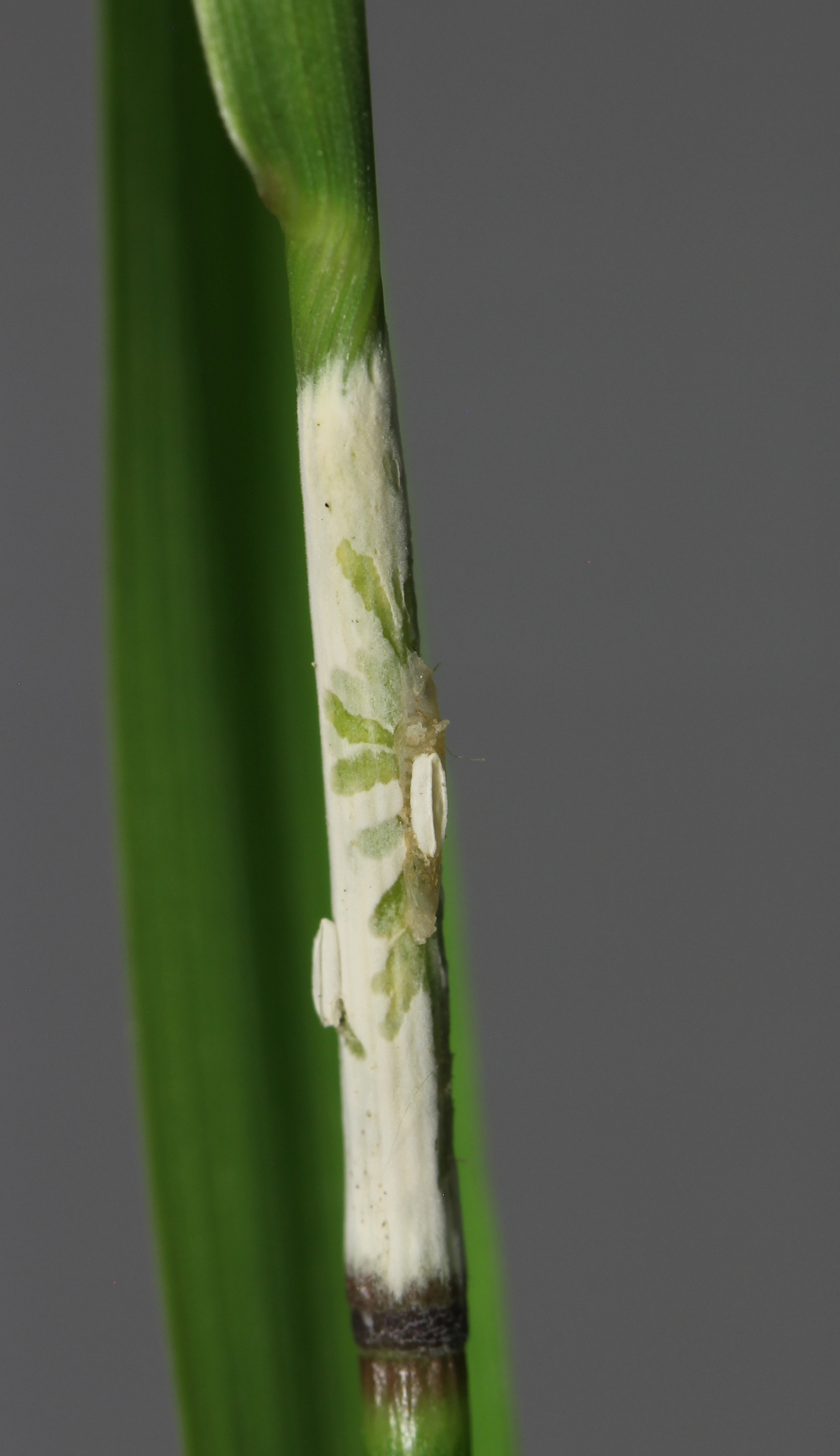

Scientific classification
- Domain: Eukaryota
- Kingdom: Fungi
- Division: Ascomycota
- Class: Sordariomycetes
- Order: Hypocreales
- Family: Clavicipitaceae
- Genus: Epichloë
- Species: E. baconii

Binomial name
- Epichloë baconii J.F. White

Synonyms
- Acremonium typhinum var. bulliforme J.F. White

= Epichloë baconii =

Species of fungus

Epichloë baconii is a haploid sexual species in the fungal genus Epichloë.

A systemic grass symbiont first described in 1993, Epichloë baconii is a sister lineage to Epichloë stromatolonga.

Epichloë baconii is found in Europe, where it has been identified in many species of grasses, including Agrostis capillaris, Agrostis stolonifera, Calamagrostis villosa, Calamagrostis varia and Calamagrostis purpurea.
