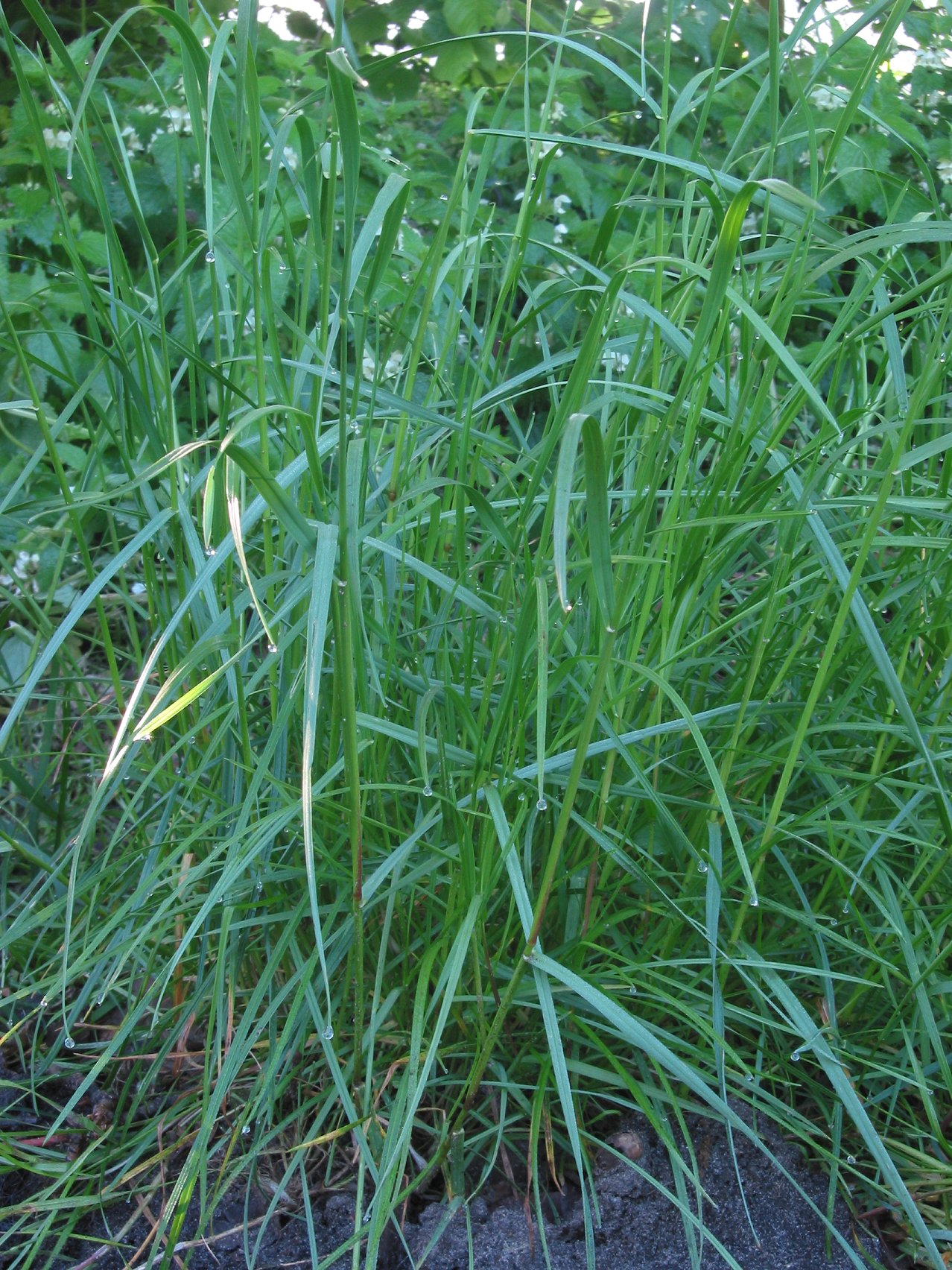

Scientific classification
- Kingdom: Plantae
- Clade: Tracheophytes
- Clade: Angiosperms
- Clade: Monocots
- Clade: Commelinids
- Order: Poales
- Family: Poaceae
- Subfamily: Pooideae
- Genus: Lolium
- Species: L. perenne

Binomial name
- Lolium perenne L.

= Lolium perenne =

Species of plant

Lolium perenne, common name perennial ryegrass, English ryegrass, winter ryegrass, or ray grass, is a grass from the family Poaceae. It is native to Europe, Asia and northern Africa, but is widely cultivated and naturalised around the world.

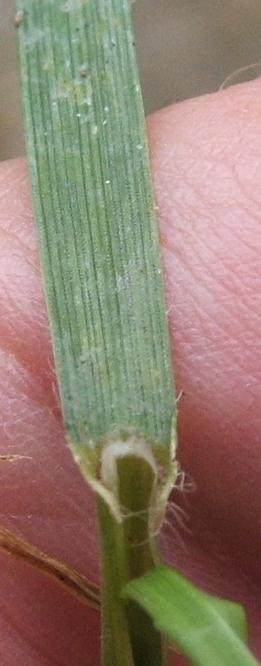
Lolium perenne, showing ligule and ribbed leaf

== Description ==
The plant is a low-growing, tufted and hairless grass, with a bunching (or tillering) growth habit. The leaves are dark green, smooth and glossy on the lower surface, with untoothed parallel sides and prominent parallel veins on the upper surface. The leaves are folded lengthwise in bud (unlike the rolled leaves of Italian ryegrass, Lolium multiflorum) with a strong central keel, giving a flattened appearance. The ligule is very short and truncated and often difficult to see. The small white auricles grip the stem at the base of the leaf blade. Leaf sheaths at the base are usually tinged pink and hairless. Stems grow up to 90 cm.

The inflorescence is unbranched, with spikelets on alternating sides edgeways-on to the stem. Each spikelet has only a single glume, on the side away from the stem, and between four and 14 florets without awns, unlike Italian ryegrass. The anthers are pale yellow, and the plant flowers from May to November. Perennial ryegrass has a fibrous root system. Roots are usually arbuscular mycorrhizal.

== Distribution ==
Perennial ryegrass is native to Europe, the Middle East, North Africa and eastwards to central Asia. As a useful species of grass for fodder and grazing livestock, it has been taken by farmers settling in new areas including North America, South Africa and Australia. It can be used to prevent erosion and to stabilise soils, as well as creating a hardwearing turf for lawns and golf courses. With its great ability to set seed, its ease of germination and vigour, it has spread from the fields where it has been planted to roadsides, trackways, footpaths, wasteland, river banks and sand dunes. In countries where it has been introduced, it may be regarded as an invasive species that competes with native plants.

== Cultivation and uses ==
Perennial ryegrass is an important pasture and forage plant, and is used in many pasture seed mixes. In fertile soil, it produces a high grass yield, and in Britain and Ireland, it is frequently sown for short-term ley grassland, often with red or white clover (Trifolium pratense or T. repens).

In Britain, it is also used as an indicator of nonspecies-rich grassland, as it outcompetes the rarer plants and grasses, especially in fertile soils. Agri-environment schemes such as the Countryside Stewardship Scheme, Environmentally Sensitive Areas Scheme, and Environmental Stewardship give funding to species-rich grasslands that do not have an abundance of ryegrass.

Selected seed mixes are used extensively for sports pitches, especially winter sports in temperate climates, because of its wear resistance and ability to regenerate.

It is commonly used in the southwest United States to overseed winter lawns. Bermudagrass is a typical summertime grass in states such as Arizona, since it is able to withstand the high temperatures. However, bermudagrass goes dormant during the cooler winter months. Rather than have brown lawns, many homeowners, public areas, and golf courses overseed these lawns with perennial ryegrass in early to mid-September.

It is also the grass used on the courts at the All England Lawn Tennis Club in Wimbledon. Since 2001, the courts have been sown with 100% perennial ryegrass to "improve durability and strengthen the sward to withstand better the increasing wear of the modern game".

== Similar species ==
Italian ryegrass, Lolium multiflorum, differs in the fact that each scale in the spikelet has a long bristle (awn) at the top. Its stem is also round rather than folded.

Couch, Elymus repens, has spikelets set on the broadside of the stem rather than edge on.

== Gallery ==
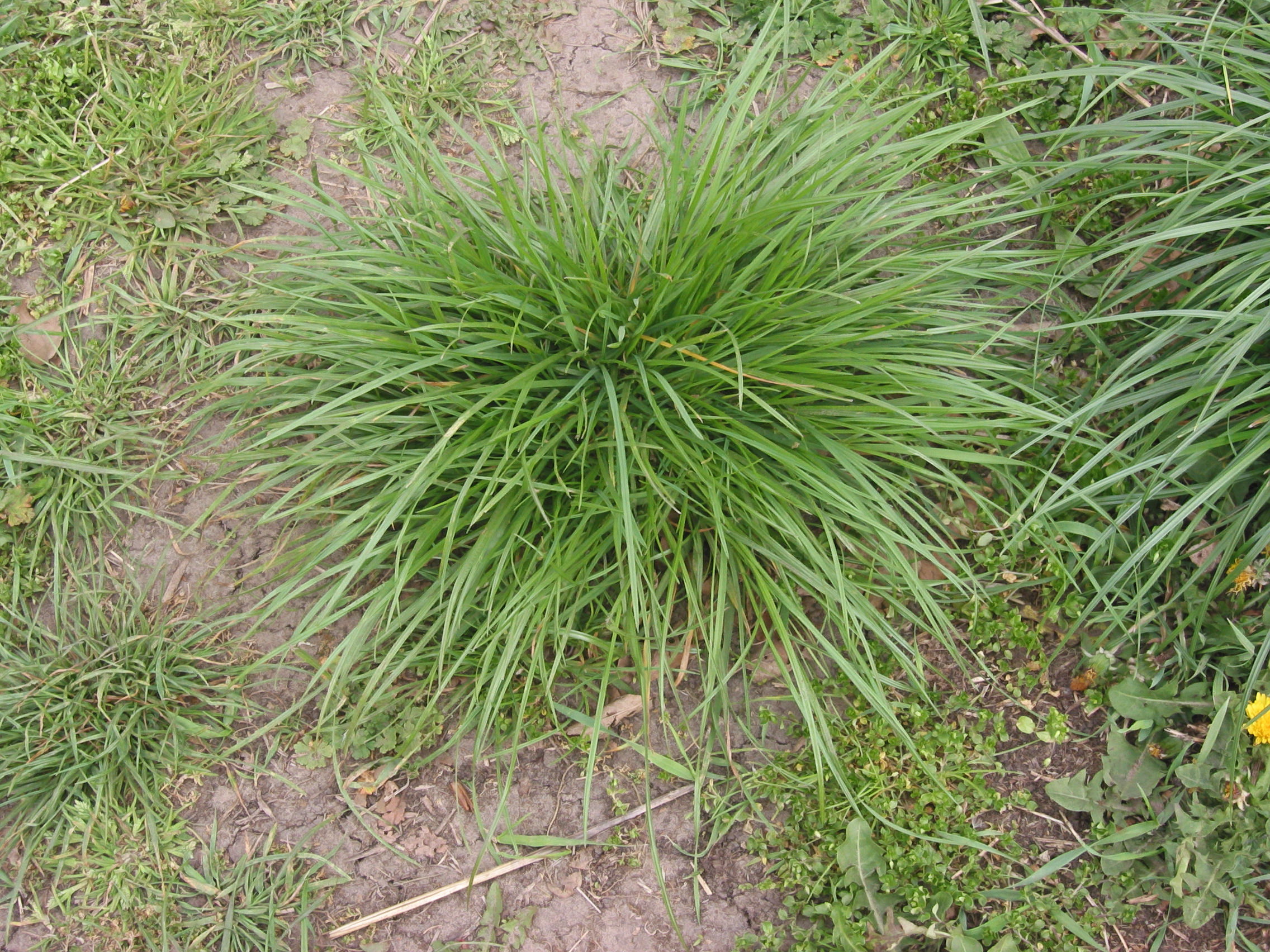
Single plant

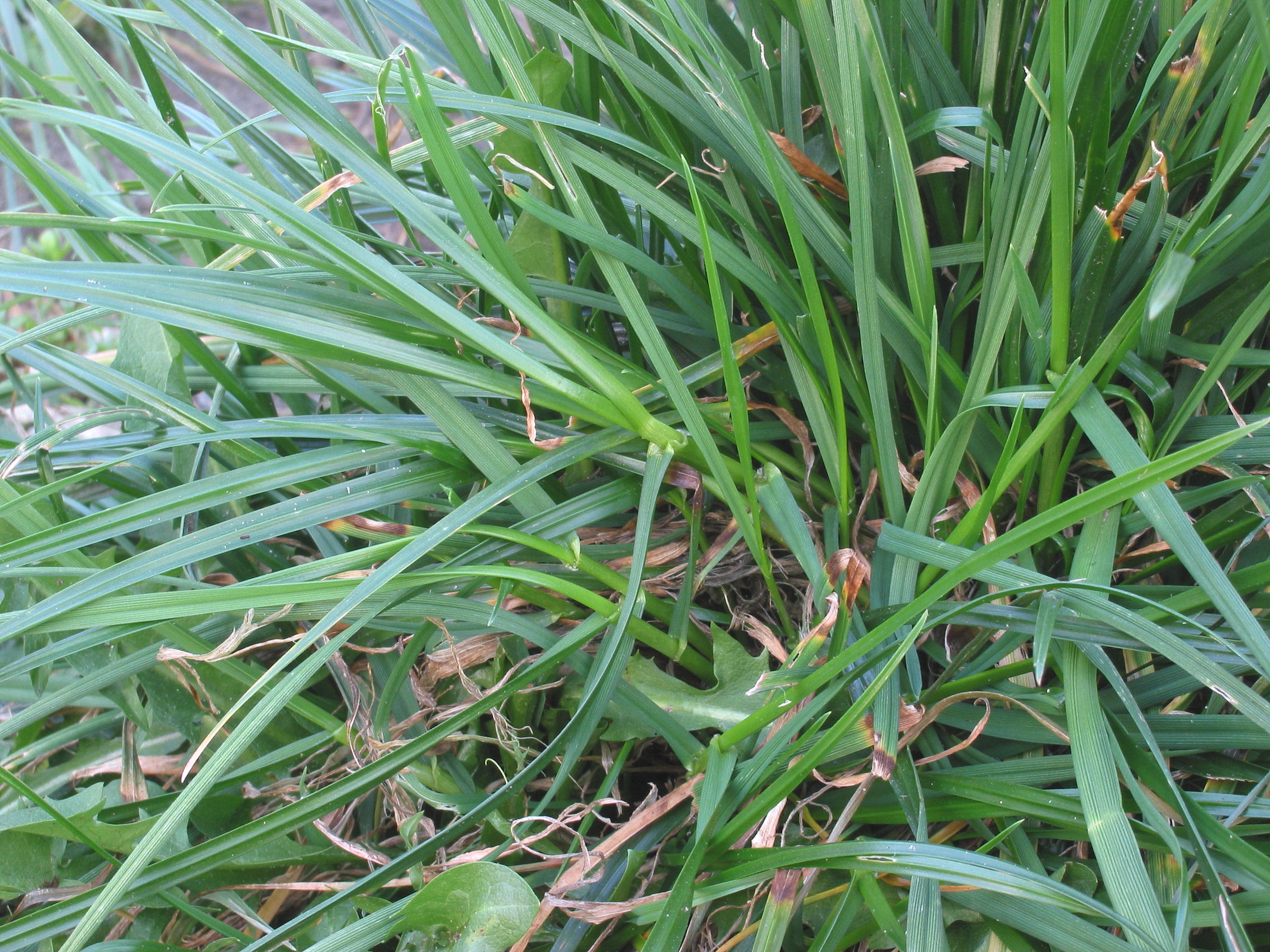
Tillers

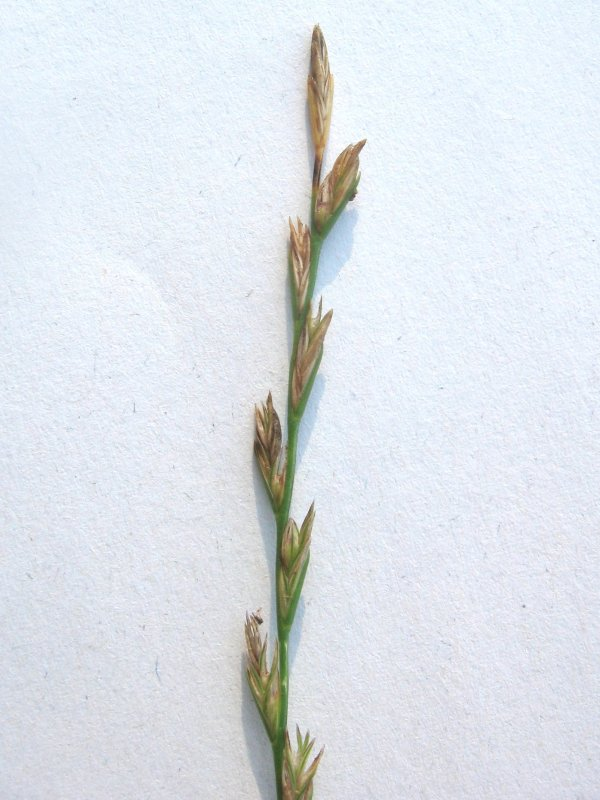
Inflorescence

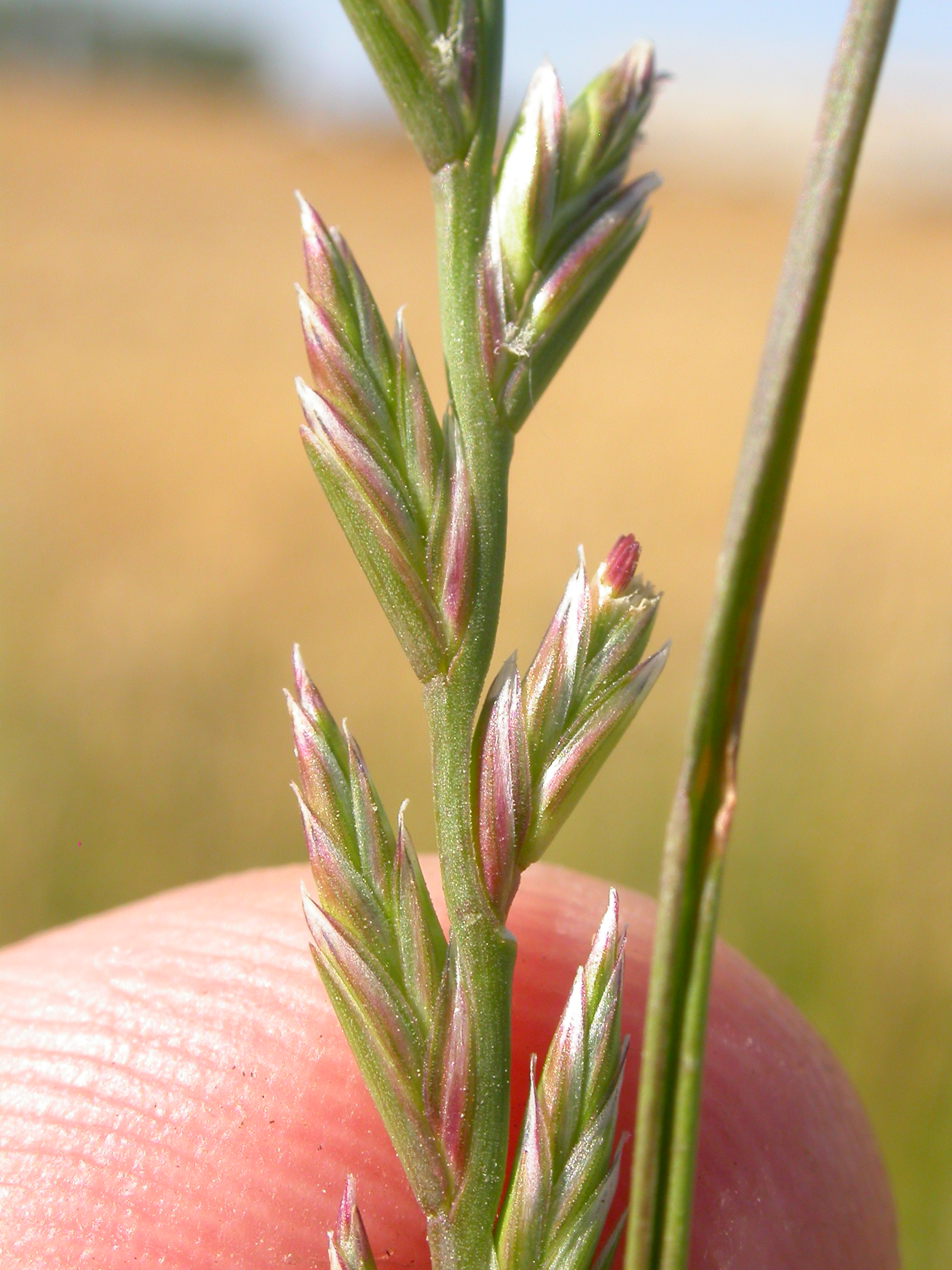
Inflorescence closeup

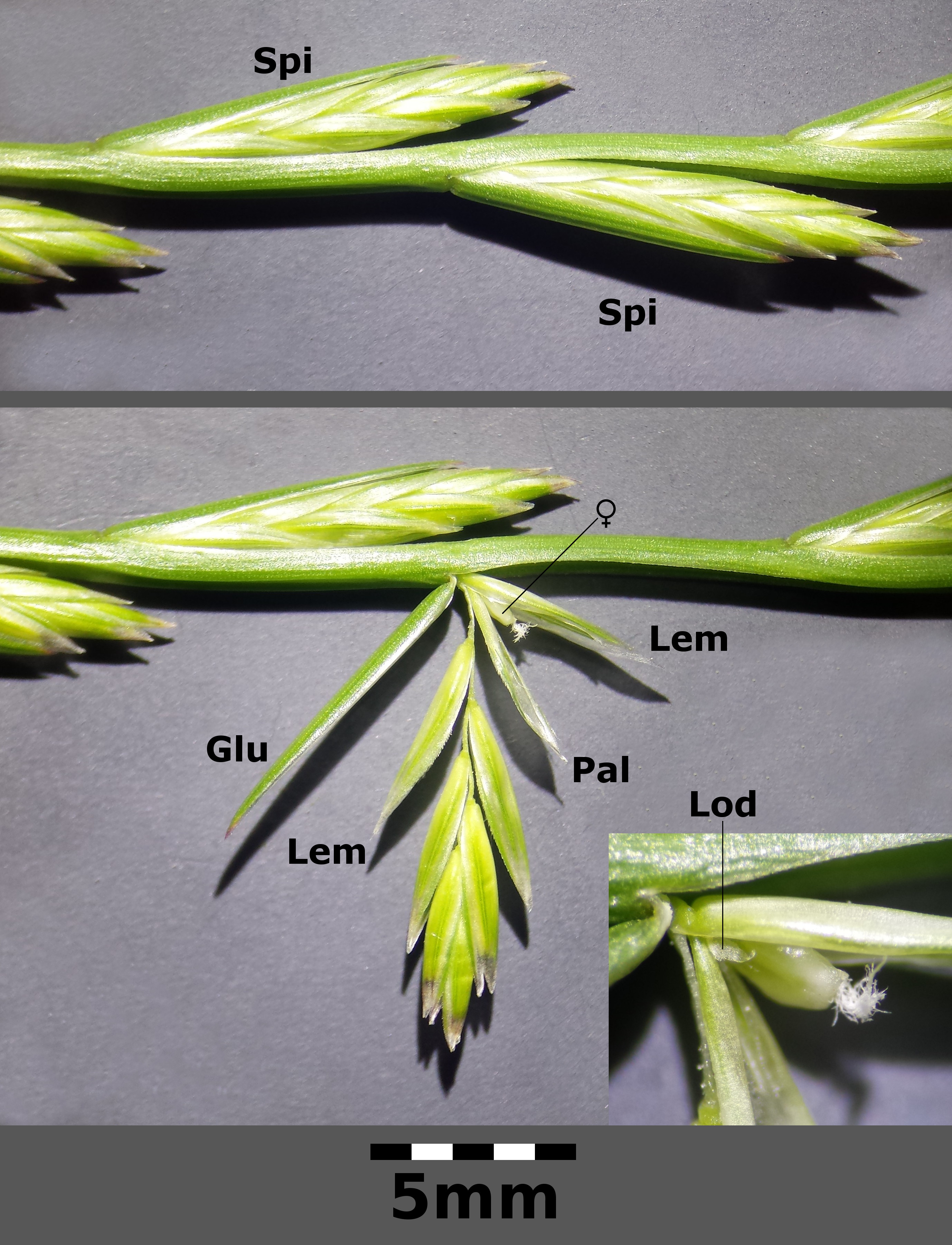
Annotated anatomical detail of flowers and fruits
Spi = Spicula
Glu = Gluma
Lem = Lemma
Pal = Palea
Lod = Lodiculae

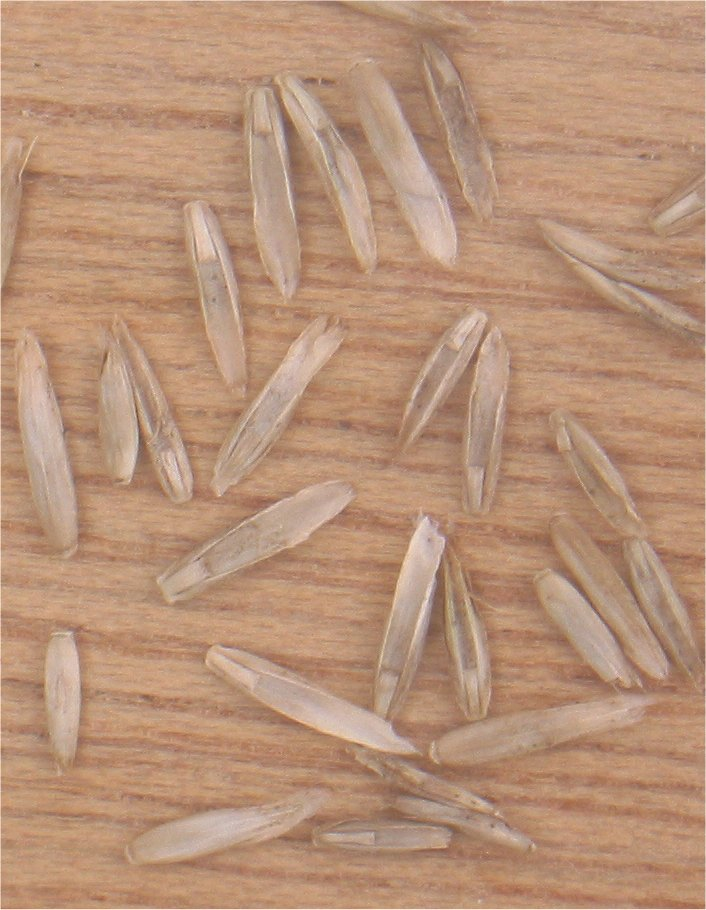
Seeds

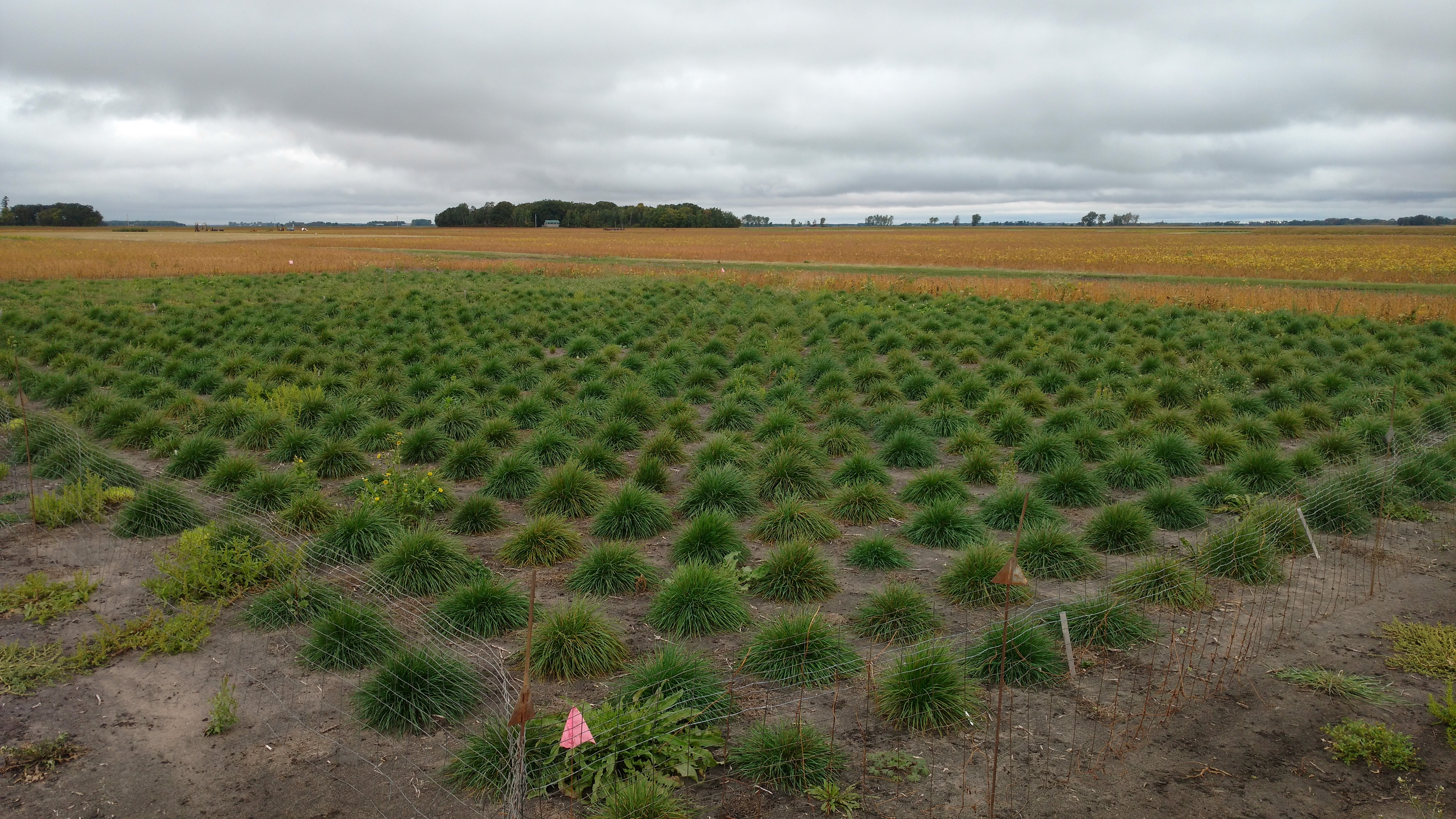
Perennial ryegrass breeding nursery
