= Tiller (botany) =

Stem produced by grass plants

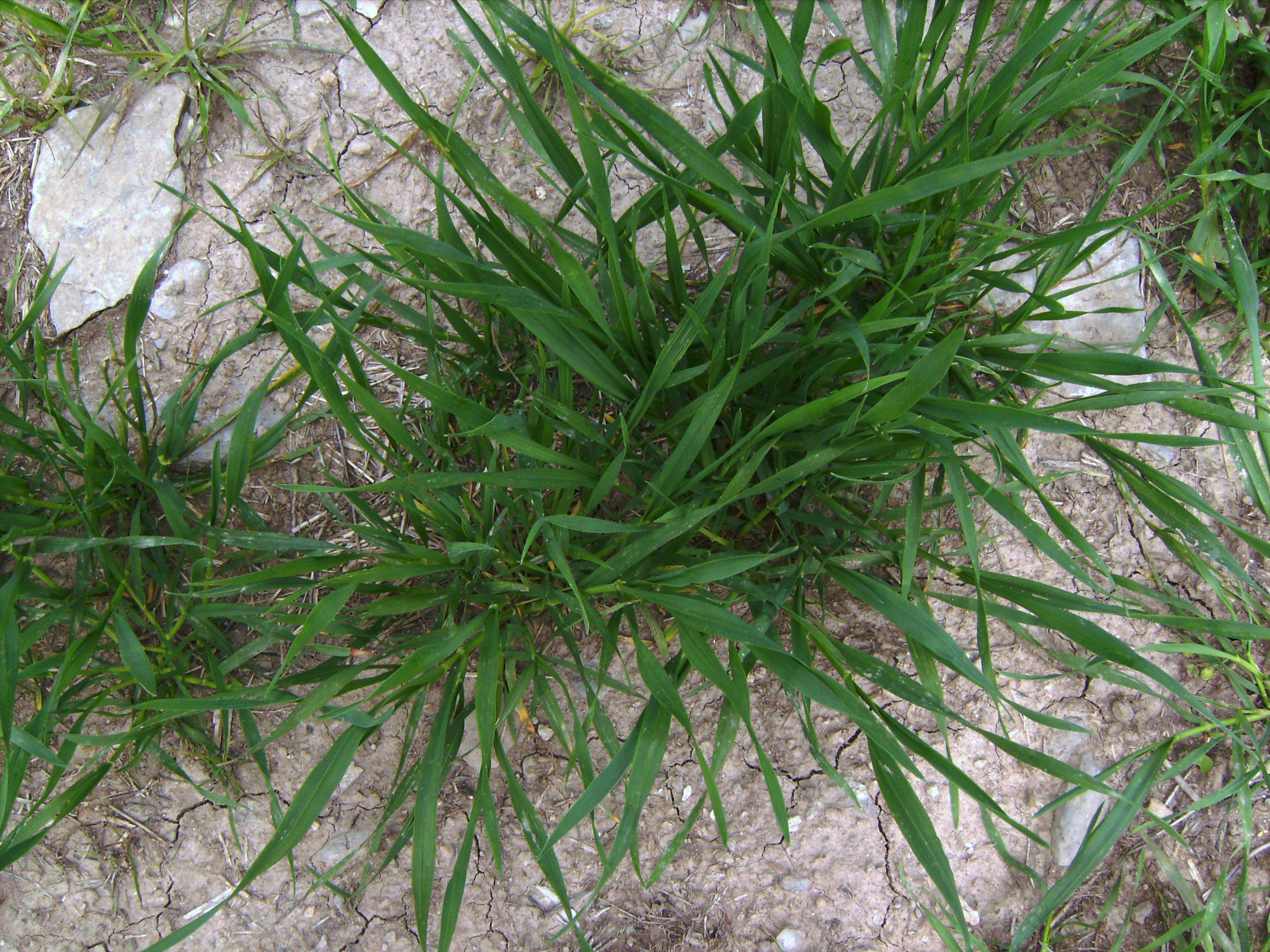
Barley plants in the tillering stage

A tiller is a shoot that arises from the base of a grass plant. The term refers to all shoots that grow after the initial parent shoot grows from a seed. Tillers are segmented, each segment possessing its own two-part leaf. They are involved in vegetative propagation and, in some cases, also seed production.

"Tillering" refers to the production of side shoots and is a property possessed by many species in the grass family. This enables them to produce multiple stems (tillers) starting from the initial single seedling. This ensures the formation of dense tufts and multiple seed heads. Tillering rates are heavily influenced by soil water quantity. When soil moisture is low, grasses tend to develop sparser and deeper root systems (as opposed to dense, lateral systems). Thus, in dry soils, tillering is inhibited: the lateral nature of tillering is not supported by lateral root growth.

== See also ==
- Crown (botany)
