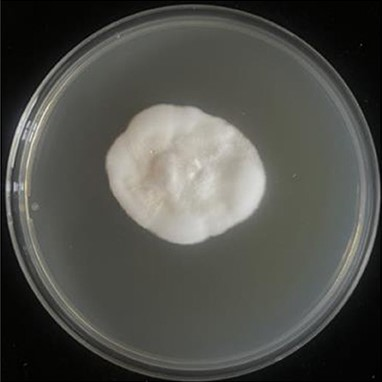
- P. chlamydosporia cultured on PDA

Scientific classification
- Kingdom: Fungi
- Division: Ascomycota
- Class: Sordariomycetes
- Order: Hypocreales
- Family: Clavicipitaceae
- Genus: Pochonia
- Species: P. chlamydosporia

Binomial name
- Pochonia chlamydosporia (Goddard) Zare & W. Gams (2001)

Synonyms
- Verticillium chlamydosporium Goddard (1913); Diheterospora heterospora Kamyschko ex Barron & Onions (1966); Diheterospora catenulata Kamyschko ex Barron & Onions (1966); Diheterospora chlamydosporia (Goddard) Barron & Onions (1966); Cordyceps chlamydosporia Evans (2001); Metacordyceps chlamydosporia (H.C. Evans) G.H. Sung, J.M. Sung, Hywel-Jones & Spatafora (2007)

= Pochonia chlamydosporia =

Species of fungus

Pochonia chlamydosporia is a species of nematophagous fungus within the family Clavicipitaceae. It is one of the most extensively studied biological control agents used against sedentary endoparasitic nematodes, including root-knot nematodes (Meloidogyne spp.) and cyst nematodes (Heterodera and Globodera spp.).

== Taxonomy ==
Originally described in 1913 by American mycologist Henry Goddard, the fungus was isolated from clay loam garden soil in Ann Arbor, Michigan, and was first identified as Verticillium chlamydosporium. In 1939, T. Petch isolated the fungus from the egg masses of the giant African land snail (Lissachatina fulica) in Sri Lanka and classified it as Stemphyliopsis ovorum. Following a later examination of Petch's materials, the fungus was re-identified as V. chlamydosporium and was briefly associated with the genera Diheterospora and Paecilomyces. In 1965, the genus Pochonia was established in Brazil by Batista and Fonseca to include the species P. humicola. In 2001, following molecular studies, the species was reclassified into the genus Pochonia, as it was the oldest available name for the clade containing these nematophagous fungi.

A sexual stage (teleomorph) was linked to the species and described as Cordyceps chlamydosporia (later moved to Metacordyceps chlamydosporia). While the genus Metacordyceps was established in 2007 to encompass Pochonia and several other asexual genera, the adoption of the "One Fungus, One Name" principle created a conflict between the names. Because Pochonia (1965) is the older generic name and represents a monophyletic, ecologically distinct group, it is recognized as the valid name over the younger Metacordyceps (2007). Consequently, Metacordyceps chlamydosporia is now treated as a synonym.

While historically considered as a polyphyletic group including species such as P. suchlasporia and P. rubescens, the genus Pochonia was restricted in 2014 to a monophyletic clade containing the type species P. chlamydosporia; the outlying species were transferred to the genus Metapochonia. Within the redefined genus, P. chlamydosporia is recognized as having five varieties: chlamydosporia, catenulata, ellipsospora, spinulospora, and mexicana. Of these, var. chlamydosporia and var. catenulata are known to produce sexual morphs on alternate hosts such as snail eggs and beetle larvae, respectively.

== Description ==
Pochonia chlamydosporia is a filamentous fungus that produces white to ochre-yellow, cottony colonies when grown on agar, typically reaching 15–40 mm in diameter over 10 days. Its vegetative structure consists of prostrate conidiophores that are often indistinguishable from the mycelium, bearing clusters of phialides.

The fungus produces two main types of asexual spores: conidia and dictyochlamydospores. The conidia are small, unicellular, and ellipsoidal to subglobose. They function as the primary means of rapid dispersal and initial infection. In contrast, the dictyochlamydospores are larger, thick-walled, multicellular resting structures. These structures allow the fungus to persist in the soil for long periods, even under unfavorable environmental conditions.

The fungus is highly adapted to the soil environment and can tolerate water potential values far below those limiting for plant growth. Its genome is approximately 41–44 Mb in size and contains a significant expansion of genes encoding secreted proteins, including subtilisins, chitinases, and carboxypeptidases, which assist in degrading nematode eggshells.

== Uses ==
=== Biological control agent ===
Pochonia chlamydosporia is primarily used as a biological control agent against sedentary endoparasitic nematodes, which are major agricultural pests. It is particularly effective against root-knot nematodes (Meloidogyne spp.) and cyst nematodes (Heterodera and Globodera spp.). The fungus targets the reproductive stage of the nematode life cycle by infecting and destroying the eggs within the egg masses or cysts, thereby reducing the population density in the soil for subsequent crop cycles.

The infection process is initiated by vegetative hyphae in the rhizosphere that produce appressoria to penetrate the host nematode. This transition from a saprophytic to a parasitic lifestyle is regulated by environmental signaling and nutrient availability, specifically triggered by nutrient depletion and low carbon-to-nitrogen ratios. Pre-penetration events involve thigmotropic responses (directional growth in response to physical contact) and the secretion of adhesion-mediating glycoproteins and enzymes.

Once contact with the host is established, the fungus utilizes a number of secreted proteins and carbohydrate-active enzymes (CAZymes) to breach the nematode eggshell. Enzymes produced include serine proteases, such as VCP1 and SCP1, and chitinases like PCCHI44. Recent genomic studies of certain strains have also identified an expansion of chitosanases and chitin deacetylases (CDA1 and CDA2) that function as determinants during the infection process and can be affected by environmental conditions. For instance, the expression of the enzyme VCP1 is inhibited by the presence of glucose but promoted in alkaline pH environments.

As a biological control agent, P. chlamydosporia is used as an alternative to chemical nematicides, which are often restricted due to environmental and health concerns. It has been found to establish itself in the rhizosphere as an endophyte and persist in the soil, which may result in long-term suppression of nematode populations.

== Research ==
In 2020, research identified that P. chlamydosporia is capable of producing ketamine, a molecule traditionally used as an anesthetic. Research suggests that ketamine produced by the fungus may contribute to the nematicidal activity by paralyzing the larvae of nematodes, including those in the genera caenorhabditis, ancylostoma, and ascaris.

Pochonia chlamydosporia has been studied for its potential to control certain snail species. Laboratory research using isolate Pc-10 demonstrated that the fungus can significantly inhibit the embryogenesis of Pseudosuccinea columella, an invasive freshwater snail responsible for transmitting parasites, including the liver fluke (Fasciola hepatica). The infection process involves the adherence and penetration of fungal hyphae into the snail's egg masses, leading to lytic effects and structural damage that can reduce embryo viability by over 93%.

Research also indicates that P. chlamydosporia may improve plant nutrient acquisition by mobilizing minerals in the soil and promote plant growth. The fungus produces acid and alkaline phosphatases that mineralize organic phosphorus, while the secretion of organic acids (including acetic, citric, and propionic acids) solubilizes inorganic phosphorus into forms more easily absorbed by plant roots. The fungus also appears to synthesize auxin, a plant hormone that regulates growth.
