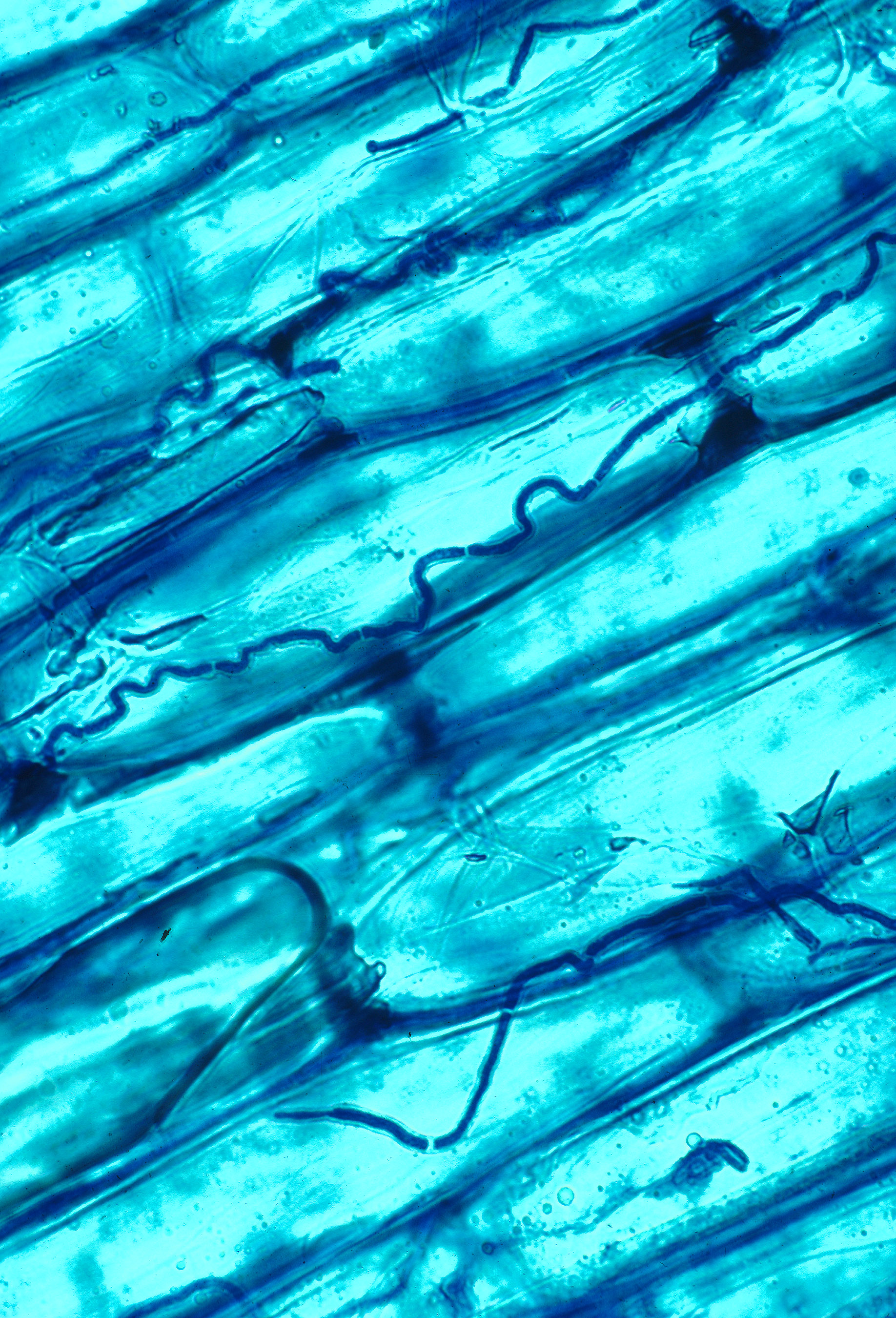
- Epichloë coeniophiala in leaves of tall fescue

Scientific classification
- Domain: Eukaryota
- Kingdom: Fungi
- Division: Ascomycota
- Class: Sordariomycetes
- Order: Hypocreales
- Family: Clavicipitaceae
- Tribe: Balansiae; W.W. Diehl

Genera
- 5 genera, see text

= Balansiae =

Tribe of fungi

Balansiae is a tribe of fungi in the family Clavicipitaceae, described in 1950. It contains endophytic fungi symbiotic with grasses and sedges.

== Genera ==
- Atkinsonella
- Balansia
- Balansiopsis
- Epichloë
- Myriogenospora
