= Baria =

Baria may refer to:

== Places ==
- Baria, Barisal, Bangladesh
- Baria, Chittagong, Bangladesh
- Baria, Gazipur Sadar Upazila, Bangladesh
  - Baria massacre, 1971
- Devgadh Baria, Dahod district, Gujarat, India
  - Baria State, one of the princely states of India during the period of the British Raj
- Bahriyeh, or Baria, Khuzestan Province, Iran
- Bà Rịa, Bà Rịa–Vũng Tàu province, Vietnam
- Baria River, in Venezuela

== Other uses ==
- Baria caste, Indian ethnic group
- Barium oxide, also known as baria, a chemical compound
- David Baria (born 1962), American politician and attorney

== See also ==
- Barya (disambiguation)
- Bariyah (disambiguation)
