= Barya =

Barya may refer to:

- Nara people, or Barya, an ethnic group inhabiting southwestern Eritrea
- Barya, India, a settlement in Dakshina Kannada district, India
- Barya (fungus), a genus of fungi in the family Clavicipitaceae
- Barya, a genus of plants in the family Begoniaceae, synonym of Begonia

== See also ==
- Baria
- Bariyah
