= Aschersonia aleyrodis =

Scientific classification
- Domain: Eukaryota
- Kingdom: Fungi
- Division: Ascomycota
- Class: Sordariomycetes
- Order: Hypocreales
- Family: Clavicipitaceae
- Genus: Aschersonia
- Species: A. aleyrodis

Binomial name
- Aschersonia aleyrodis Webber

Species of fungus

Aschersonia aleyrodis is a fungal pathogen affecting various species of insect. It has been shown to control the silverleaf whitefly (Bemisia tabaci) in laboratory and greenhouse conditions.

== Description ==
The stroma of Aschersonia aleyrodis forms a hemispherical or cushion-shaped mass about 2 mm (0.08 in) wide and 2 mm (0.08 in) high, surrounded by a thin ring of hyphae that spreads across the leaf-surface. The conidia-forming zones consist of shallow pits in the stroma with pore-like openings. The conidia are elongated and cigar-shaped, and do not have septa. This fungus is cream, pink or pale orange, and the massed conidia are darker orange. The teleomorph of this fungus is Hypocrella.

== Biological control of whitefly ==
Whitefly are an increasing pest of greenhouse crops such as cucumber and tomato. The classical biological control is by the use of parasitoid wasps such as Encarsia formosa , but aggressive strains of whitefly have emerged and results are unpredictable. Another approach is with the use of entomopathogenic fungi such as Aschersonia aleyrodis and this has met with some success, the main target insect being greenhouse whitefly (Trialeurodes vaporariorum).

Infectivity and persistence is greater on some crops than others. Germination of conidia tends to be low on the leaves, but the conidia remain viable there for a month or more, as can be shown by washing them off with water onto an agar plate. Infectivity of whitefly nymphs was highest on cucumbers (90%) at 31 days, whereas on gerberas it was 80% initially but had decreased to 40% by day 31, and on poinsettia, germination capacity of the conidia was still 60% at 31 days after application, but nymphal mortality, initially 70%, fell to 10% after three days and remained low for the rest of the month. The pathogen is an effective biocontrol agent for silverleaf whitefly under the conditions found in greenhouse and laboratory.
