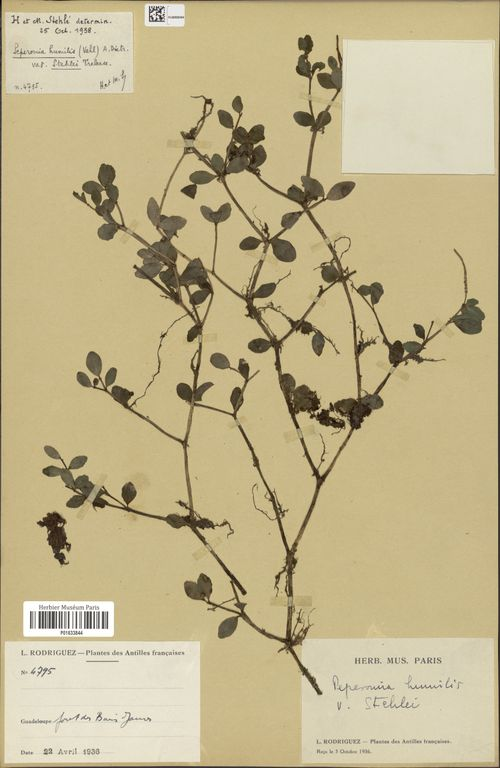

Scientific classification
- Kingdom: Plantae
- Clade: Tracheophytes
- Clade: Angiosperms
- Clade: Magnoliids
- Order: Piperales
- Family: Piperaceae
- Genus: Peperomia
- Species: P. truncigaudens

Binomial name
- Peperomia truncigaudens C.DC.

Synonyms
- Peperomia humilis var. stehlei Trel.

= Peperomia truncigaudens =

Species of flowering plant

Peperomia truncigaudens is a species of epiphyte in the genus Peperomia found in Guadeloupe. It primarily grows on wet tropical biomes. Its conservation status is Threatened.

== Description ==
The first specimens where collected in Guadeloupe.

Peperomia truncigaudens has long petiolate leaves with an elliptic base, a long acuminate and obtuse apex, glabrous on both sides, three to five nerved, and minutely puberulous petioles. It has an axillary and terminal peduncle with glabrous petioles. The spikes are subequal to the limbs. The bracts are orbicular to the center, briefly pedicellate. The berries emerge, ovate-globose, and with an obliquely apiculate apex.

The herb can be 2 mm thick with tiny puberulous branches. The lower limbs are cuneate obovate at the base, approximately 1 cm long, while superior limbs are up to 22 mm long and up to 12 mm wide when dry and membrane-bound. The petiole is about 1 cm long. Bacciferae spikes are only 1 mm thick, and the rhachis is glabrous. Stigmatiferous under the obtuse apex, the ovary emerges. The stigma is tiny and glabrous.

== Taxonomy and naming ==
It was described in 1902 by Casimir de Candolle in Symbolae Antillanae seu Fundamenta Florae Indiae Occidentalis, from specimens collected by Antoine Duss . It gets its name from the location where the specimens were first found, the trunks of a tree.

== Distribution and habitat ==
It is endemic in Guadeloupe. It grows on epiphyte environment and is a herb. It grows on wet tropical biomes.

== Conservation ==
This species is assessed as Threatened, in a preliminary report.
