= Pochonia =

Scientific classification
- Kingdom: Fungi
- Division: Ascomycota
- Class: Sordariomycetes
- Order: Hypocreales
- Family: Clavicipitaceae
- Genus: Pochonia; Bat. & Fonseca, 1965

Genus of fungi

Pochonia is a genus of fungi within the order Hypocreales and is described as anamorphic Metacordyceps; eight species are described. Previously placed in the genus Verticillium, these fungi are known to be pathogenic to nematodes and are being developed and commercialized as biological pesticides.

The genus name of Pochonia is in honour of Jacques Pochon (1907–1978), who was a French doctor and microbiologist from the Pasteur Institute. Pochonia has been seen to contain ketamine.

The genus was circumscribed by Augusto Chaves Batista and Ozório José de Menezes Fonseca in Publ. Inst. Micol. Univ. Recife vol.462 on page 4 in 1965.

== Species ==
The IndexFungorum records the following species;

- Pochonia bulbillosa (W. Gams & Malla) Zare & W. Gams 2001
- Pochonia chlamydosporia (Goddard) Zare & W. Gams 2001
  - Pochonia chlamydosporia var. catenulata (Kamyschko ex G.L. Barron & Onions) Zare & W. Gams 2001
  - Pochonia chlamydosporia var. chlamydosporia (Goddard) Zare & W. Gams 2001
- Pochonia globispora Zare & W. Gams 2007
- Pochonia goniodes (Drechsler) Zare & W. Gams 2001
- Pochonia humicola Bat. & O.M. Fonseca 1965
- Pochonia microbactrospora W. Gams & Zare 2001
- Pochonia parasitica (G.L. Barron) G.H. Sung, J.M. Sung, Hywel-Jones & Spatafora 2007
- Pochonia rubescens Zare, W. Gams & López-Llorca 2001
- Pochonia suchlasporia (W. Gams & Dackman) Zare & W. Gams 2001
  - Pochonia suchlasporia var. catenata (W. Gams & Dackman) Zare & W. Gams 2001
  - Pochonia suchlasporia var. suchlasporia (W. Gams & Dackman) Zare & W. Gams 2001
