= Fleischeria =

Fleischeria may refer to two different genera of organisms:

- Fleischeria Penz. & Sacc., a taxonomic synonym for Moelleriella, a genus of fungi
- Fleischeria Hochst. & Steud. ex Boiss., a taxonomic synonym for Scorzonera, a genus of plants
