= Aciculosporium monostipum =

Scientific classification
- Kingdom: Fungi
- Division: Ascomycota
- Class: Sordariomycetes
- Order: Hypocreales
- Family: Clavicipitaceae
- Genus: Aciculosporium
- Species: A. monostipum

Binomial name
- Aciculosporium monostipum (J.White, G.Bills, S.Alderman & J.Spatafora) M. Kolařík & Píchová (2018)

Synonyms
- Neoclaviceps monostipa J.F. White, Bills, S.C. Alderman & Spatafora (2001)

Genus of fungi

Aciculosporium monostipum is a species of fungi in the family Clavicipitaceae. It infects individual florets in the same way as species of the genus Claviceps but does not produce sclerotia. When grown in pure culture it shows dimorphism in production of a yeast-like ephelidial phase as well as a mycelial phase.
