= Myriogenospora aciculispora =

Scientific classification
- Domain: Eukaryota
- Kingdom: Fungi
- Division: Ascomycota
- Class: Sordariomycetes
- Order: Hypocreales
- Family: Clavicipitaceae
- Genus: Myriogenospora
- Species: M. aciculispora

Binomial name
- Myriogenospora aciculispora Vizioli (1926)

Species of fungus

Myriogenospora aciculispora is a fungal plant pathogen. It has been reported to cause disease among sugarcane in Brazil.
