= Mycomalmus =

Scientific classification
- Kingdom: Fungi
- Division: Ascomycota
- Class: Sordariomycetes
- Order: Hypocreales
- Family: Clavicipitaceae
- Genus: Mycomalmus; A. Möller

Genus of fungi

Mycomalmus is a genus of fungi within the Clavicipitaceae family.
