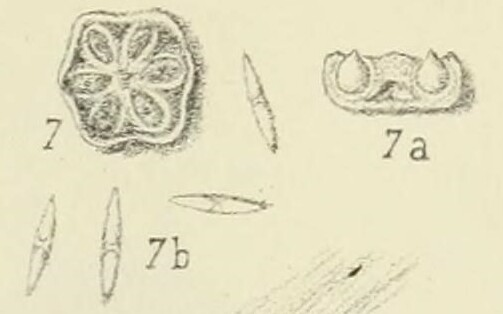
- Aschersonia disciformis

Scientific classification
- Domain: Eukaryota
- Kingdom: Fungi
- Division: Ascomycota
- Class: Sordariomycetes
- Order: Hypocreales
- Family: Clavicipitaceae
- Genus: Aschersonia; Mont., 1848

Synonyms
- Underwoodina Kuntze (1891)

= Aschersonia =

Genus of fungi in the family Clavicipitaceae

Aschersonia is a genus of fungi in the order Hypocreales and family Clavicipitaceae. The genus name was erected in honour of Paul Friedrich August Ascherson (1834–1913), a German botanist. Species in this genus include entomopathogenic fungi: for example, A. aleyrodis may be used for biological control of whitefly pests.

== Species ==
Mycobank lists the following:

1. Aschersonia abnormis
2. Aschersonia acutispora
3. Aschersonia aleyrodis Webber 1897
4. Aschersonia amazonica
5. Aschersonia andropogonis
6. Aschersonia aurantiaca
7. Aschersonia australiensis Henn. 1903
8. Aschersonia badia
9. Aschersonia basicystis
10. Aschersonia blumenaviensis
11. Aschersonia brunnea
12. Aschersonia caapi
13. Aschersonia caespiticia
14. Aschersonia calendulina
15. Aschersonia calendulina
16. Aschersonia carpinicola
17. Aschersonia chaetospora
18. Aschersonia cinnabarina
19. Aschersonia coffeae
20. Aschersonia columnifera
21. Aschersonia confluens
22. Aschersonia conica
23. Aschersonia consociata
24. Aschersonia crenulata
25. Aschersonia crustacea
26. Aschersonia crustata
27. Aschersonia cubensis Berk. & M.A. Curtis 1868
28. Aschersonia disciformis
29. Aschersonia duplex
30. Aschersonia eugeniae
31. Aschersonia fimbriata
32. Aschersonia flava
33. Aschersonia flavescens
34. Aschersonia flavocitrina
35. Aschersonia formosensis
36. Aschersonia fusispora
37. Aschersonia goldiana
38. Aschersonia guianensis
39. Aschersonia henningsii
40. Aschersonia hypocreoidea
41. Aschersonia incrassata
42. Aschersonia insperata
43. Aschersonia intermedia
44. Aschersonia jacarandae
45. Aschersonia javanica
46. Aschersonia javensis
47. Aschersonia juruensis
48. Aschersonia lauricola
49. Aschersonia lecanii
50. Aschersonia lecanioides
51. Aschersonia luteola
52. Aschersonia macrostromatica
53. Aschersonia macularis
54. Aschersonia marginata
55. Aschersonia mellea
56. Aschersonia microspora
57. Aschersonia minutispora
58. Aschersonia murrayae
59. Aschersonia napoleonae
60. Aschersonia narathiwatensis
61. Aschersonia novoguineensis
62. Aschersonia oxystoma
63. Aschersonia oxystoma
64. Aschersonia papillata
65. Aschersonia paraensis
66. Aschersonia paraphysata
67. Aschersonia parasitica
68. Aschersonia pediculoides
69. Aschersonia philippinensis
70. Aschersonia phthiurioides
71. Aschersonia pisiformis
72. Aschersonia pittieri
73. Aschersonia placenta Berk. 1873
74. Aschersonia rufa
75. Aschersonia samoensis
76. Aschersonia sclerotioides
77. Aschersonia scutelliformis
78. Aschersonia simplex
79. Aschersonia spathulata
80. Aschersonia spatulata
81. Aschersonia suzukii
82. Aschersonia tahitensis
83. Aschersonia taitensis Mont. (1848) – type species
84. Aschersonia tamurai
85. Aschersonia tephrosicola
86. Aschersonia tephrosiicola
87. Aschersonia turbinata
88. Aschersonia viridans
89. Aschersonia viridula
90. Aschersonia zenkeri

Note: other species may now be synonyms placed in similar genera such as Hypocrella.
