= Polynema =

Polynema may refer to:

- Polynema (fungus), a genus of fungi in the family Clavicipitaceae
- Polynema (wasp), a genus of fairyflies or fairy wasps, insects in the family Mymaridae
