= Vladimir Andreevich Tranzschel =

Russian mycologist (1868–1942)

- Born: January 16, 1868; St Petersburg
- Died: January 21, 1942 (aged 74); St Petersburg
- Other name: Woldemar Heirich Tranzschel
- Occupation: Mycologist
- Known for: Tranzschel’s Law in Rust fungus evolution

Vladimir Andreevich Tranzschel (Russian: Владимир Андреевич Траншель) (January 16 [O.S. January 4] 1868 – January 21, 1942) was a Russian and later Soviet botanist, mycologist and plant pathologist, especially an expert on rust fungi.

He graduated from Saint Petersburg University in 1889 and became an assistant at the Imperial Forestry Institute in Saint Petersburg. From 1895 until 1899 he was co-editor of the exsiccata Fungi Rossiae exsiccati. 1898–1900, he was stationed at the University of Warsaw, but soon returned to Saint Petersburg and took a position a curator at the Botanic Garden of the Imperial Academy of Sciences. He remained affiliated with the Academy for the remainder of his career, from 1912 as senior botanist. He travelled and made collections in European Russia, Germany, Switzerland, Austria, Crimea, Kyrgyzstan, Pamir Mountains, Ussuri and Primorsky.

He is particularly known for Tranzschel's Law, that states that telia of microcyclic species of rust fungi that are descendants of macrocyclic, heteroecious rusts simulate aecia of the ancestral macrocyclic rust and occur on the aecial host of the latter. Tranzschel devised his law to assists in identification of the aecial host of a suspected heteroecious rust by looking for hosts attacked by a microcyclic rust with morphologically similar telia to the former. Modern evolutionary thinking about rust fungi and molecular investigations have confirmed its validity .

In addition, Tranzschel described a number of new species of rust fungi and wrote fungas for various parts of Russia. Together with A. Henckel, Tranzschel also translated Kerner von Marilaun’s Pflanzenleben from German to Russian.

The rust fungus genus Tranzschelia Arthur was named to his honour.

== Selected species described by Tranzschel ==
- Dasyscyphella cassandrae Tranzschel
- Helminthascus arachnophthorus Tranzschel
- Pucciniastrum arcticum Tranzschel
- Ustilago turcomanica Tranzschel

== Selected scientific works ==
- Tranzschel, V. A. (1902) Contributiones ad floram mycologicam Rossiæ, I. Enumeratio fungorum in Tauria a. 1901 lectorum. Trudy Botanicheskago Muzeya Imperatorskoy Akademii Nauk / Travaux du Musée Botanique de l'Academie Imperiale des Sciences de St-Petersbourg, vol. 1: 47–75 (in Russian)
- Tranzschel, V. A. (1905) Contributiones ad floram mycologicam Rossiæ, II. Enumeratio fungorum in Tauria lectorum. Trudy Botanicheskago Muzeya Imperatorskoy Akademii Nauk / Travaux du Musée Botanique de l'Academie Imperiale des Sciences de St-Petersbourg, vol. 2: 31–47 (in Russian)
- Tranzschel, V. A. (1925) Systematics and biology of the genus Triphragmium auct. (Triphragmium Link, Triphragmiopsis Naumov, Nyssopsora Arthur). Journal of Botanical Society of Russia, 8: 123–132. (in Russian)
- Tranzschel, V. A. (1927) Rust Fungi and their bearing on the Systematics of Vascular Plants. Festschrift for I. P. Borodin. (in Russian)
- Tranzschel, V. A. (1933) Uredinalium species novae ex Siberia. Trudy Botanicheskogo Instituta Akademii Nauk SSSR / Acta Instituti Botanici Academiae Scientiarum Unionis Rerum Publicarum Soveticarum Socialisticarum, ser. 11: Sporovye rastenenija, Fasc. 1: 267–273. (in Russian)
- Tranzschel, V. A. (1936) The Uredinales as indicators of the affinity of their hosts in relationship to their evolution. Sovietskaya Botanica 1936 nr. 6: 133–144. (in Russian)
- Tranzschel, V. A. (1938) Zur Biologie der Uredineen des Fernen Ostens. Trudy Botanicheskogo Instituta Akademii Nauk SSSR / Acta Instituti Botanici Academiae Scientiarum Unionis Rerum Publicarum Soveticarum Socialisticarum, ser. 11: Sporovye rastenenija (in Russian)
- Tranzschel, V. A. (1939) Conspectus Uredinalium URSS. Moskva-Leningrad, Akademii Nauk SSSR. 426 pp. (in Russian)
- Kuprevich, V. T. & Tranzschel, V. A. (1957) Flora Plantarum Cryptogamarum URSS: Fungi 1, Uredinales, Fasc. 1 Familia Melampsoraceae. Moskva, Academiae Scientiarum URSS. 419 pp. (in Russian)
