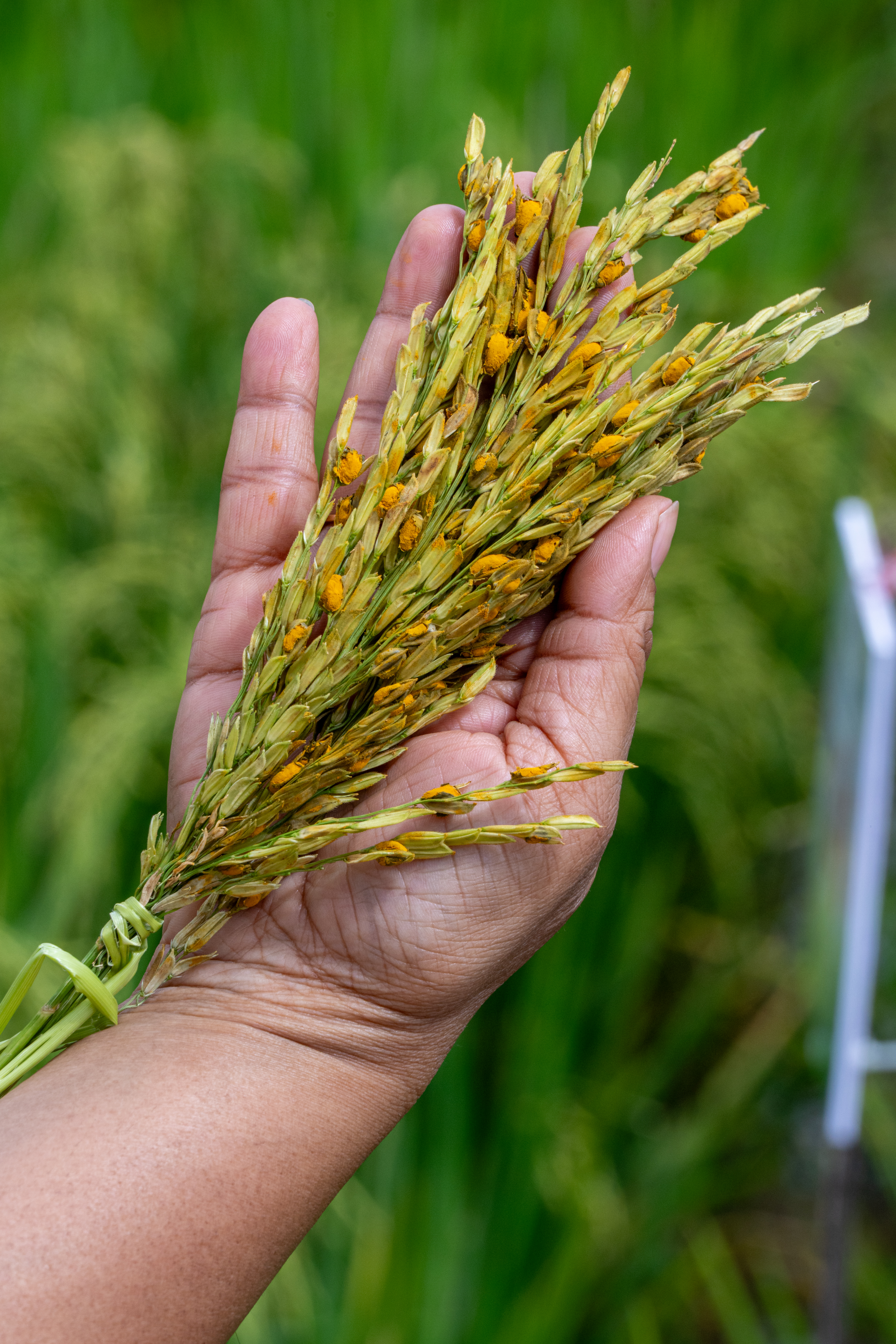
- U. virens smut balls on a rice head

Scientific classification
- Kingdom: Fungi
- Division: Ascomycota
- Class: Sordariomycetes
- Order: Hypocreales
- Family: Clavicipitaceae
- Genus: Ustilaginoidea
- Species: U. virens

Binomial name
- Ustilaginoidea virens (Cooke) Takah., (1896)

Synonyms
- Sphacelotheca virens Omori{?}, (1896); Tilletia oryzae Pat., (1887); Ustilaginoidea oryzae (Pat.) Bref., (1895); Ustilago virens Cooke, (1878)

= Ustilaginoidea virens =

Species of fungus

Ustilaginoidea virens, perfect sexual stage Villosiclava virens, is a plant pathogen which causes the disease "false smut" of rice which reduces both grain yield and grain quality. The disease occurs in more than 40 countries, especially in the rice producing countries of Asia. but also in the U.S. As the common name suggests, it is not a true smut (fungus), but an ascomycete. False smut does not replace all or part of the kernel with a mass of black spores, rather sori form erupting through the palea and lemma forming a ball of mycelia, the outermost layers are spore-producing. Infected rice kernels are always destroyed by the disease.

Of particular concern are the production of alkaloids in the grain as with the Claviceps spp. causing ergot however U. virens is not a Claviceps/ergot fungus, is not known to produce ergotism, and lacks enzymes necessary in ergot synthesis.

Although U. virens does infect maize/corn, it does not do so often, produce significant disease, or have economic consequences.

== Disease cycle ==
U. virens has a peculiar life cycle. White hyphae are produced by the fungi after initial infection of the floral organs of the rice crop. As the infection matures with time, darker brownish green chlamydospores are produced on the rice spikelets. Additionally, sclerotia can be present towards the end of the fall season. During its life cycle, U. virens undergoes a sexual (ascospores) stage as well as an asexual (chlamydospores) stage. The chlamydospores are the main survival structure, and they can live in the soil for up to four months. The additional formation of sclerotia allows U. virens to survive even longer, almost up to a year. These sclerotia, which can be present either on or below the surface of the soil, mature to form an ascocarp (fruiting body). The ascospores from these fruiting bodies act as the primary source of infection to spread disease throughout the paddy field.

== Infection ==
The rice false smut pathogen, Ustilaginoidea virens, invades through a small gap at the apex of a rice spikelet before heading. The primary source of infection is the presence of chlamydospores in the soil. During the vegetative stage of the growth of the rice crop, the fungus colonizes the tissue on the growing points on the tillers. This happens when conidia get deposited on the spikelets of the rice crop, which later lead to the growth of hyphae. The mycelia from these hyphae invade the floral organs in the spikelets.

== Disease control ==
The rice false smut pathogen causes mostly qualitative damage to the rice crop. Removal of the brown "smut balls" is important to maintain the visual integrity of the harvested crop. Additionally, certain steps can be taken to manage and/or prevent the onset of disease. Most rice varieties are susceptible to the disease; however, some cultivars of rice provide a small amount of resistance against U. virens. As of 2019 there are still no known resistant cultivars, with the very best being only of "moderate" susceptibility. Planting rice earlier in the season can also reduce the amount of disease caused by false smut. In some studies, rice planted in April showed much less presence of false smut than rice planted after 15 May. As is the case for most rice diseases, large amounts of fertilizer in the soil lead to increase in disease. Maintaining the nitrogen rate in the soil to a level below 160 pounds per acre has proven to be most efficient against stopping disease. Although there are no specific fungicide recommendations for the eradication of the false smut pathogen of rice, Cartwright reported that propiconazole was the most effective ingredient after studying it for over three years.
