= Marquandomyces =

Scientific classification
- Kingdom: Fungi
- Division: Ascomycota
- Class: Sordariomycetes
- Order: Hypocreales
- Family: Clavicipitaceae
- Genus: Marquandomyces; Samson, Houbraken & Luangsa-ard (2020)

Genus of fungi

Marquandomyces is a genus of fungus in the family Clavicipitaceae.

Species in this genus include:

- Marquandomyces marquandii
- Marquandomyces sinensis
