= Cavimalum =

Scientific classification
- Kingdom: Fungi
- Division: Ascomycota
- Class: Sordariomycetes
- Order: Hypocreales
- Family: Clavicipitaceae
- Genus: Cavimalum; Yoshim. Doi, Dargan & K.S. Thind

Type species
- Cavimalum indicum Yoshim. Doi, Dargan & K.S. Thind

Genus of fungi

Cavimalum is a genus of fungi within the Clavicipitaceae family.
