= Dussia foxii =

Conservation status
- Vulnerable (IUCN 2.3)

Scientific classification
- Kingdom: Plantae
- Clade: Tracheophytes
- Clade: Angiosperms
- Clade: Eudicots
- Clade: Rosids
- Order: Fabales
- Family: Fabaceae
- Subfamily: Faboideae
- Genus: Dussia
- Species: D. foxii

Binomial name
- Dussia foxii Rudd

Species of plant

Dussia foxii is a species of flowering plant in the family Fabaceae. It is found only in Peru.
