= Pucciniastrum arcticum =

Scientific classification
- Domain: Eukaryota
- Kingdom: Fungi
- Division: Basidiomycota
- Class: Pucciniomycetes
- Order: Pucciniales
- Family: Pucciniastraceae
- Genus: Pucciniastrum
- Species: P. arcticum

Binomial name
- Pucciniastrum arcticum Tranzschel, (1895)

Species of fungus

Pucciniastrum arcticum is a plant pathogen infecting caneberries.
