= Dussiella =

Scientific classification
- Domain: Eukaryota
- Kingdom: Fungi
- Division: Ascomycota
- Class: Sordariomycetes
- Order: Hypocreales
- Family: Clavicipitaceae
- Genus: Dussiella; Pat.

Type species
- Dussiella tuberiformis (Berk. & Ravenel) Pat.

Synonyms
- Echinodothis G.F. Atk. (1894)

Genus of fungi

Dussiella is a genus of fungi within the family Clavicipitaceae.

The genus name of Dussiella is in honour of Antoine Duss (1840–1924), who was a Swiss botanist.

The genus was circumscribed by Narcisse Théophile Patouillard in Bull. Soc. Mycol. France Vol.6 on page 107 in 1890.
