= Helicocollum =

Scientific classification
- Kingdom: Fungi
- Division: Ascomycota
- Class: Sordariomycetes
- Order: Hypocreales
- Family: Clavicipitaceae
- Genus: Helicocollum; Luangsa-ard, Mongkols., Noisrip. & Thanak. (2017)

Genus of fungi

Helicocollum is a genus of fungi belonging to the family Clavicipitaceae.

Species in this genus include:

- Helicocollum chanthaburiense
- Helicocollum krabiense
- Helicocollum samalanense
- Helicocollum surathaniensis
