= Ephelis (fungus) =

Scientific classification
- Kingdom: Fungi
- Division: Ascomycota
- Class: Sordariomycetes
- Order: Hypocreales
- Family: Clavicipitaceae
- Genus: Ephelis; Fr. (1849)

Genus of fungi

Ephelis is a genus of fungi in the family Clavicipitaceae.

Species in this genus include:

- Ephelis borealis
- Ephelis brevis
- Ephelis caricina
- Ephelis japonica
- Ephelis mexicana
- Ephelis oryzae
- Ephelis pallida
- Ephelis poae
- Ephelis rhinanthi
- Ephelis rhynchosporae
- Ephelis trinitensis
- Ephelis tripsaci
- Ephelis viridans
