= Linearistroma =

Scientific classification
- Kingdom: Fungi
- Division: Ascomycota
- Class: Sordariomycetes
- Order: Hypocreales
- Family: Clavicipitaceae
- Genus: Linearistroma; Höhn. (1910)

Genus of fungi

Linearistroma is a genus of fungi in the family Clavicipitaceae.

Species in this genus include:

- Linearistroma lineare
