= Helminthascus =

Scientific classification
- Kingdom: Fungi
- Division: Ascomycota
- Class: Sordariomycetes
- Order: Hypocreales
- Family: Clavicipitaceae
- Genus: Helminthascus; Tranzschel

Type species
- Helminthascus arachnophthorus Tranzschel

Genus of fungi

Helminthascus is a genus of fungi within the Clavicipitaceae family. This is a monotypic genus, containing the single species Helminthascus arachnophthorus.
