= Regiocrella =

Scientific classification
- Kingdom: Fungi
- Division: Ascomycota
- Class: Sordariomycetes
- Order: Hypocreales
- Family: Clavicipitaceae
- Genus: Regiocrella; Chaverri & K.T.Hodge (2006)

Type species
- Regiocrella camerunensis Chaverri & H.C.Evans (2006)

Genus of fungi

Regiocrella is a genus of fungi in the family Clavicipitaceae.
