= Aciculosporium =

Scientific classification
- Domain: Eukaryota
- Kingdom: Fungi
- Division: Ascomycota
- Class: Sordariomycetes
- Order: Hypocreales
- Family: Clavicipitaceae
- Genus: Aciculosporium; I.Miyake (1908)

Type species
- Aciculosporium take I.Miyake (1908)

Synonyms
- Albomyces I. Miyake ex I. Hino (1962); Cepsiclava J. Walker (2004); Mitosporium Clem. & Shear (1931); Neoclaviceps J.F. White, Bills, S.C. Alderman & Spatafora (2001)

Genus of fungi

Aciculosporium is a genus of fungi in the family Clavicipitaceae. Species of this genus cause witches' broom of bamboo in East Asia. Aciculosporium take grows intercellularly in witches' broom shoots, including shoot apical meristems. The stroma are produced around the apex of the host shoots.

== Species ==
The index fungorum currently (2021) lists:

1. Aciculosporium monostipum (J.F. White, Bills, S.C. Alderman & Spatafora) M. Kolařík & Píchová (2018)
2. Aciculosporium oplismeni E. Tanaka (2021)
3. Aciculosporium phalaridis (J. Walker) M. Kolařík & Píchová (2018)
4. Aciculosporium sasicola Oguchi (2001)
5. Aciculosporium take I. Miyake (1908)
