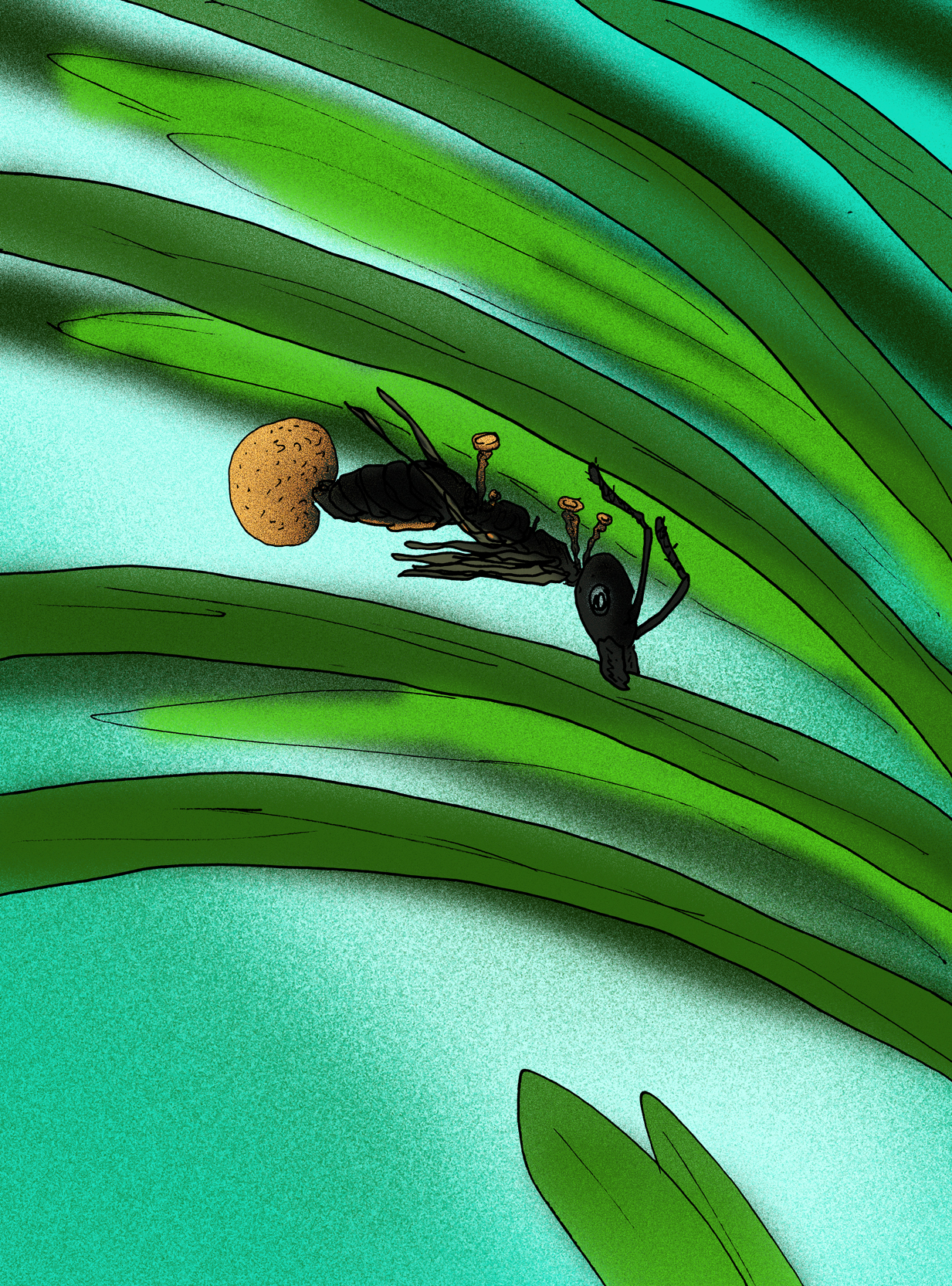
- Restoration of A. baltica on Camponotus

Scientific classification
- Kingdom: Fungi
- Division: Ascomycota
- Class: Sordariomycetes
- Order: Hypocreales
- Family: Clavicipitaceae
- Genus: Allocordyceps; Poinar

Type species
- Allocordyceps baltica Poinar

= Allocordyceps =

Allocordyceps Temporal range: Middle Eocene

Extinct genus of fungus

Allocordyceps is an extinct genus of parasitic fungus in the order Hypocreales that parasitized carpenter ants. The fossil of Allocordyceps baltica, from the Baltic Amber, represents the oldest known fossil of an ant-parasitizing fungus before Ophiocordyceps.

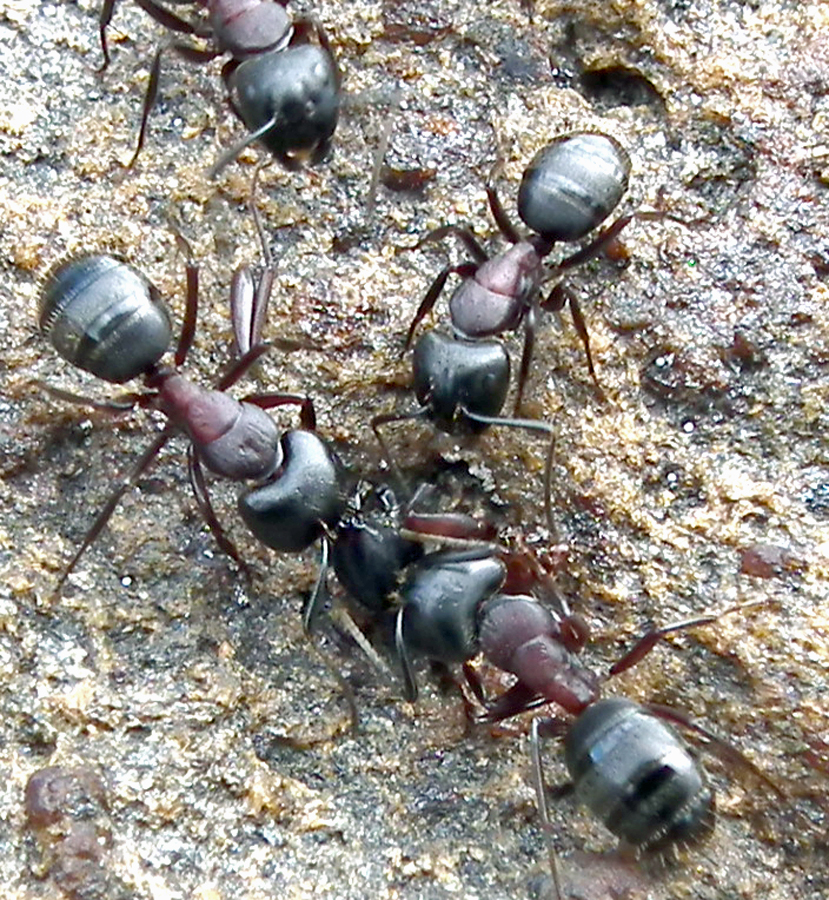
Carpenter ants, similar to the host parasitized by A. baltica

== Description ==
Allocordyceps is characterized by its ascoma being an orange color, stalked and cusp shaped. It also has a pair of partially immersed perithecia that emerges from the rectum. Hosts parasitized by Allocordyceps have separate stromata with separate mycelium emerging from the neck and abdomen. It may have altered its host's behavior similarly to the extant Ophiocordyceps unilateralis.
