= Loculistroma =

Scientific classification
- Kingdom: Fungi
- Division: Ascomycota
- Class: Sordariomycetes
- Order: Hypocreales
- Family: Clavicipitaceae
- Genus: Loculistroma; F. Patt. & Charles

Type species
- Loculistroma bambusae F. Patt., Charles & Veihmeyer

Genus of fungi

Loculistroma is a genus of fungi within the Clavicipitaceae family. This is a monotypic genus, containing the single species Loculistroma bambusae.
