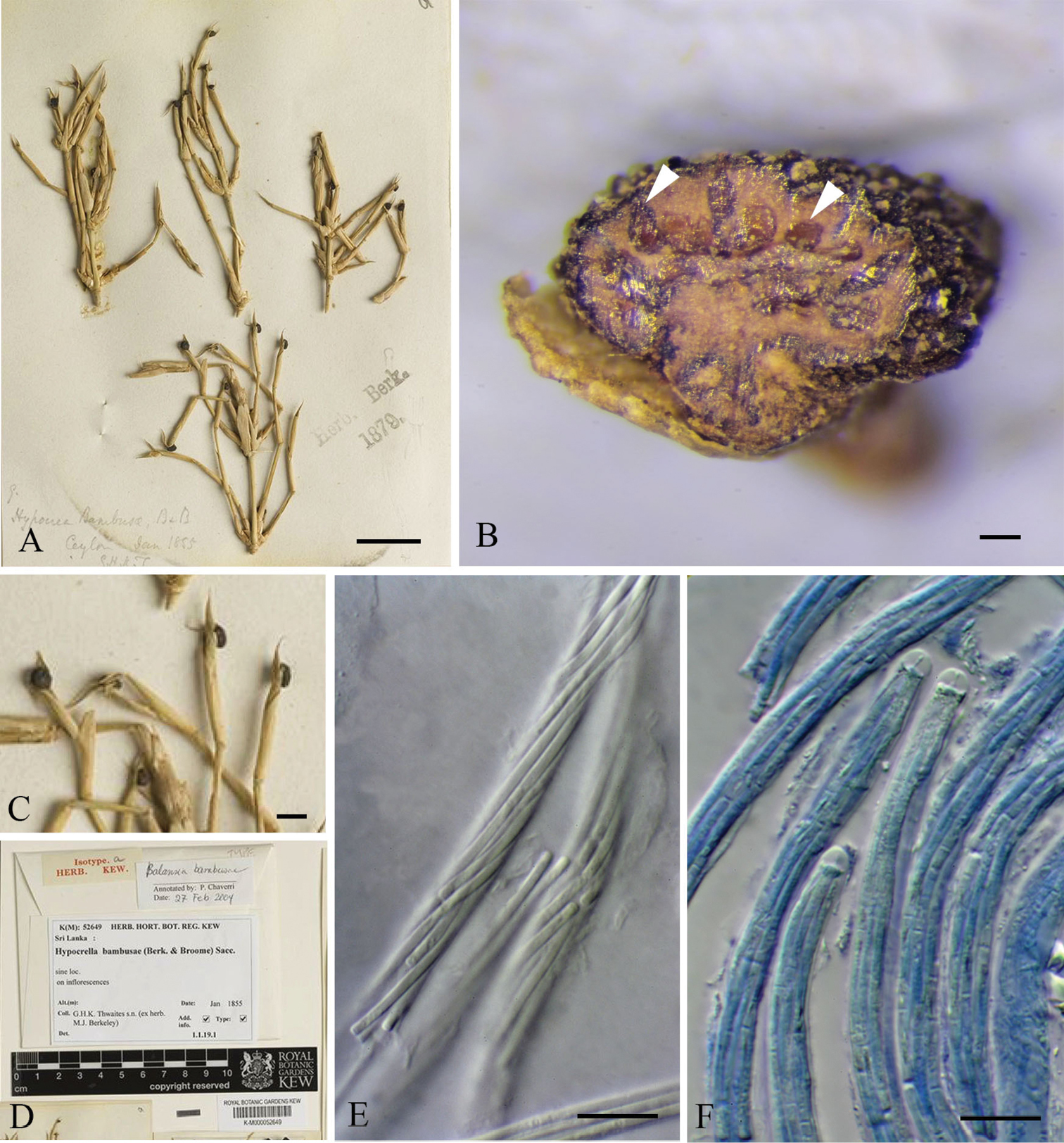
- Balansia bambusae, please click on image for details.

Scientific classification
- Domain: Eukaryota
- Kingdom: Fungi
- Division: Ascomycota
- Class: Sordariomycetes
- Order: Hypocreales
- Family: Clavicipitaceae
- Tribe: Balansiae
- Genus: Balansia; Speg. (1885)

Type species
- Balansia claviceps Speg. (1885)

Synonyms
- Dothichloe G.F. Atk. (1894); Ophiodothis Sacc. (1883); Trichochora Theiss. & Syd. (1915)

= Balansia =

Genus of fungi

Balansia is a genus of fungi in the family Clavicipitaceae.

Species from this genus have been found to produce an ergopeptine otherwise unknown in nature, and based upon this discovery it was subsequently named ergobalansine
