= Drechmeria =

Scientific classification
- Kingdom: Fungi
- Division: Ascomycota
- Class: Sordariomycetes
- Order: Hypocreales
- Family: Clavicipitaceae
- Genus: Drechmeria; W. Gams & H.-B. Jansson

Genus of fungi

Drechmeria is a genus of fungi in the family Clavicipitaceae.

The species in this genus include:

- Drechmeria bactrospora
- Drechmeria balanoides
- Drechmeria campanulata
- Drechmeria coniospora
- Drechmeria glockingiae
- Drechmeria gunii
- Drechmeria harposporioides
- Drechmeria obovata
- Drechmeria panacis
- Drechmeria rhabdospora
- Drechmeria sinensis
- Drechmeria sphaerospora
- Drechmeria zeospora
