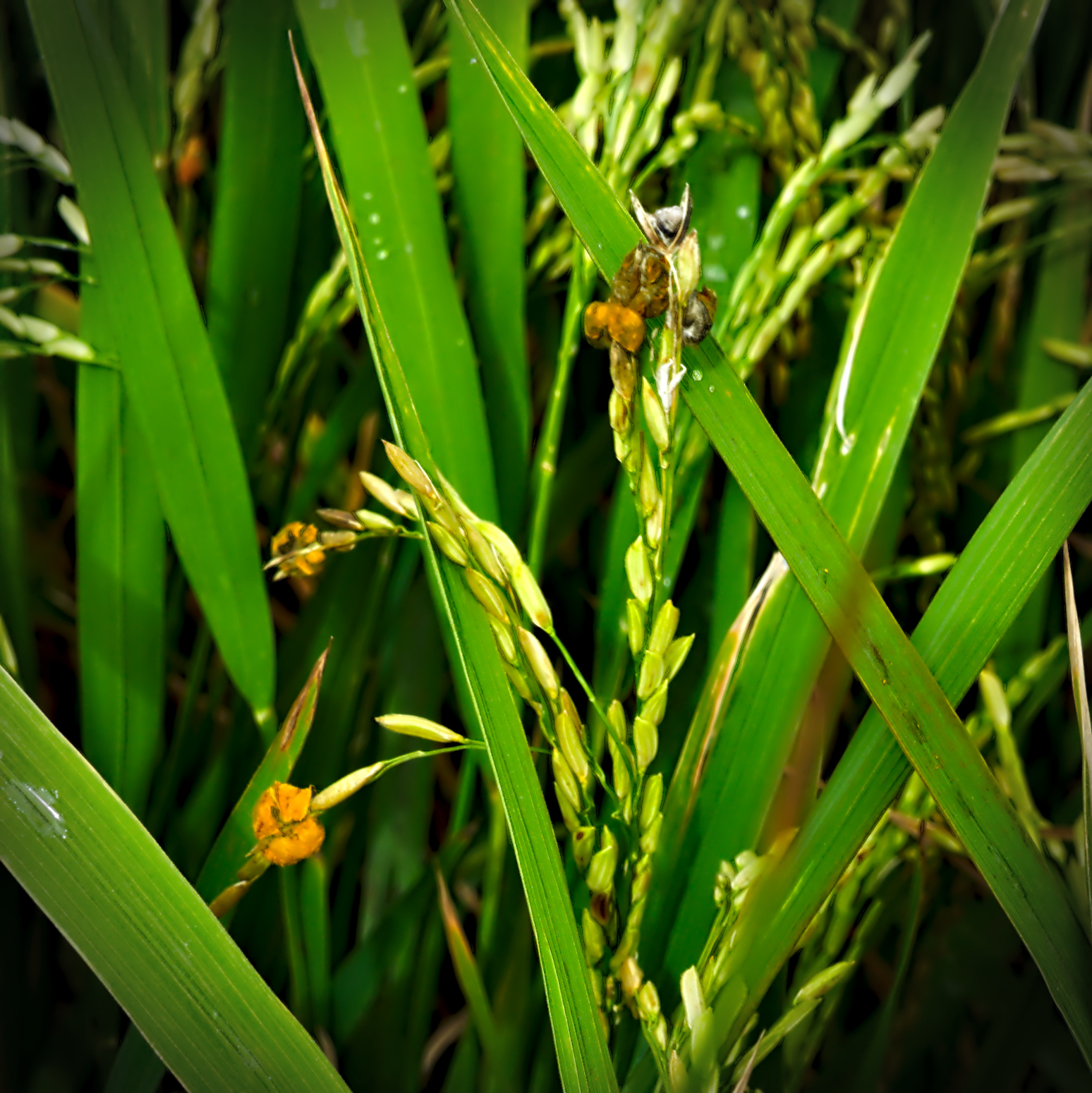
- U. virens smut balls on a rice head

Scientific classification
- Kingdom: Fungi
- Division: Ascomycota
- Class: Sordariomycetes
- Order: Hypocreales
- Family: Clavicipitaceae
- Genus: Ustilaginoidea; Bref. (1895)

Type species
- Ustilaginoidea oryzae (Pat.) Bref. (1895)

Synonyms
- Dubiomyces Lloyd (1920); Villosiclava E.Tanaka & C.Tanaka (2009)

= Ustilaginoidea =

Genus of fungi

Ustilaginoidea is a genus of fungi in the family Clavicipitaceae. The genus contains 19 species. Ustilaginoidea was circumscribed by German botanist Julius Oscar Brefeld in 1895, with Ustilaginoidea oryzae assigned as the type species. Ustilaginoidea virens causes the disesase known alternatively as rice false smut, pseudosmut, or green smut.

== Species ==
- Ustilaginoidea albicans Shu Wang & J.K.Bai (1997)
- Ustilaginoidea arundinellae Henn. (1905)
- Ustilaginoidea bogoriensis Racib. (1907)
- Ustilaginoidea borneensis Syd. & P.Syd. (1921)
- Ustilaginoidea congensis Henn. (1907)
- Ustilaginoidea dichromenae Henn. (1904)
- Ustilaginoidea flavonigrescens (Berk. & M.A.Curtis) Henn. (1904)
- Ustilaginoidea oplismeni T.S.Ramakr. & Sundaram (1952)
- Ustilaginoidea penniseti I.Miyake (1912)
- Ustilaginoidea polliniae Teng (1936)
- Ustilaginoidea reticulata (Speg.) Zundel (1953)
- Ustilaginoidea sacchari-narengae Sawada (1914)
- Ustilaginoidea setariae Bref. (1895)
- Ustilaginoidea usambarensis Henn. (1902)
- Ustilaginoidea virens (Cooke) Takah. (1896)
