= Berkelella =

Scientific classification
- Kingdom: Fungi
- Division: Ascomycota
- Class: Sordariomycetes
- Order: Hypocreales
- Family: Clavicipitaceae
- Genus: Berkelella (Sacc.) Sacc.

Type species
- Berkelella caledonica (Pat.) Sacc.

Synonyms
- Byssostilbe Petch (1912); Hypomyces subgen. Berkelella Sacc. (1883)

Genus of fungi

Berkelella is a genus of fungi in the family Clavicipitaceae .

== Species ==
As accepted by Species Fungorum;

- Berkelella caledonica (Pat.) Sacc. (1891)
- Berkelella stilbigera (Berk. & Broome) Sacc. (1891)

Former species, B. stromaticola (Henn.) Höhn. (1909) = Puttemansia stromaticola, Tubeufiaceae family
