= Myriogenospora =

Scientific classification
- Domain: Eukaryota
- Kingdom: Fungi
- Division: Ascomycota
- Class: Sordariomycetes
- Order: Hypocreales
- Family: Clavicipitaceae
- Tribe: Balansiae
- Genus: Myriogenospora; G.F.Atk. (1894)

Type species
- Myriogenospora paspali G.F.Atk. (1894)

Species
- M. aciculispora M. atramentosa M. bresadolana M. paspali

Genus of fungi

Myriogenospora is a genus of fungi in the family Clavicipitaceae.
