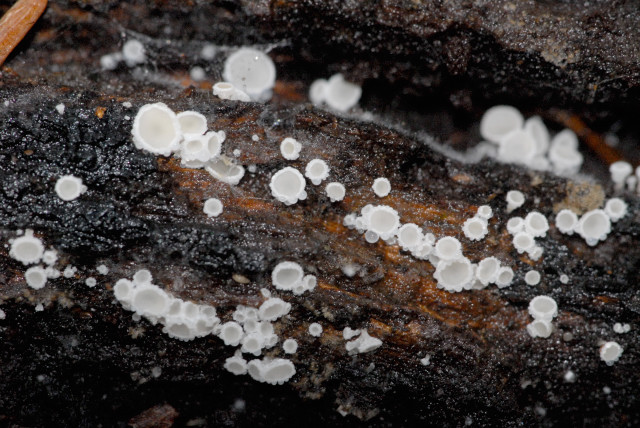
- Dasyscyphella nivea

Scientific classification
- Kingdom: Fungi
- Division: Ascomycota
- Class: Leotiomycetes
- Order: Helotiales
- Family: Hyaloscyphaceae
- Genus: Dasyscyphella; Tranzschel

Type species
- Dasyscyphella cassandrae Tranzschel

= Dasyscyphella =

Genus of fungi

Dasyscyphella is a genus of fungi within the Hyaloscyphaceae family. The genus contains 23 species.

== Species ==
- Dasyscyphella cassandrae
- Dasyscyphella crystallina
- Dasyscyphella dryina
- Dasyscyphella longistipitata (White-spotted daisy mushroom)
- Dasyscyphella nivea

== See also ==
- Fagus crenata
