= Stereocrea =

Scientific classification
- Kingdom: Fungi
- Division: Ascomycota
- Class: Sordariomycetes
- Order: Hypocreales
- Family: Clavicipitaceae
- Genus: Stereocrea; Syd. & P. Syd.

Type species
- Stereocrea schizostachyi Syd. & P. Syd.

Genus of fungi

Stereocrea is a genus of fungi within the Clavicipitaceae family.
