= Shimizuomyces =

Scientific classification
- Domain: Eukaryota
- Kingdom: Fungi
- Division: Ascomycota
- Class: Sordariomycetes
- Order: Hypocreales
- Family: Clavicipitaceae
- Genus: Shimizuomyces; Kobayasi

Type species
- Shimizuomyces paradoxus Kobayasi

Genus of fungi

Shimizuomyces is a genus of fungi within the family Clavicipitaceae.

The genus was circumscribed by Yosio Kobayasi in Bull. Natl. Sci. Mus. Tokyo B, vol.7 on page 1 in 1981.

The genus name of Shimizuomyces is in honour of Daisuke Shimizu (1915–1998), who was a Japanese botanist, lichenologist, bryologist and mycologist.

== Species ==
As accepted by Species Fungorum;

- Shimizuomyces kibianus Kobayasi & Shimizu (1984)
- Shimizuomyces paradoxus Kobayasi (1981)
