= Heteroepichloe =

Scientific classification
- Kingdom: Fungi
- Division: Ascomycota
- Class: Sordariomycetes
- Order: Hypocreales
- Family: Clavicipitaceae
- Genus: Heteroepichloë; E. Tanaka, C. Tanaka, Abdul Gafur & Tsuda

Type species
- Heteroepichloë bambusae (Pat.) E. Tanaka, C. Tanaka, Gafur & Tsuda

Genus of fungi

Heteroepichloë is a genus of fungi within the Clavicipitaceae family.
