= Bariyah =

Bariyah (alternative spelling: Bareea) is an Arabic name. It may refer to:

- Bareea, album by Egyptian singer Mohamed Mounir
- El-Bariyah, the Palestinian name for the Judaean Desert
- Shahru Al-Bariyah, an Indian princess from which the Malay kings of Singapore are said to be descendants
- Siti Bariyah, wife of Indonesian politician Burhanuddin Harahap

== See also ==
- Baria
- Bariah
- Barya
