= Epicrea =

Scientific classification
- Kingdom: Fungi
- Division: Ascomycota
- Class: Sordariomycetes
- Order: Hypocreales
- Family: Clavicipitaceae
- Genus: Epicrea; Petr.

Type species
- Epicrea insignis Petr.

Genus of fungi

Epicrea is a genus of fungi within the Clavicipitaceae family. This is a monotypic genus, containing the single species Epicrea insignis.
