= Keithomyces =

Scientific classification
- Kingdom: Fungi
- Division: Ascomycota
- Class: Sordariomycetes
- Order: Hypocreales
- Family: Clavicipitaceae
- Genus: Keithomyces; Samson, Luangsa-ard & Houbraken (2020)

Genus of fungi

Keithomyces is a genus of fungi in the family Clavicipitaceae.

Species in this genus include:

- Keithomyces acicularis
- Keithomyces carneus
- Keithomyces echinosporus
- Keithomyces indicus
- Keithomyces neogunii
