= Antoine Duss =

Swiss botanist

Antoine Düss (August 14, 1840 – May 5, 1924) was a Swiss botanist, Catholic priest, and educator who made contributions to the study of Caribbean flora. Born in Hasle, Switzerland, he joined the Congregation du Saint-Esprit in Paris and was ordained in 1871. Düss taught at educational institutions in Martinique and Guadeloupe, where he conducted botanical research, collecting and cataloguing plant specimens throughout the French Antilles. His major work, "Flore des Antilles françaises," published in 1897, documented the phanerogamic flora of the region, and he later produced catalogues of cryptogams. For his scientific contributions, he was made an Officer of the Academy in 1898, an Officer of Public Instruction in 1905, and was appointed a Knight of the Legion of Honour shortly before his death.

== Early life ==
Antoine Düss was born in Hasle, Switzerland, on 14 August 1840. He graduated from the Gymnasium in Luzern and continued his studies in Fribourg. In 1863, he entered the Congregation du Saint-Esprit et du Saint-Coeur de Marie in Paris and became a student at the seminary of Chevilly, near Paris. Titled variably as Abbé, Père (Father) or Reverend, he was ordained and made his profession on 1 October 1871.

During a visit to his native Switzerland, he provided numerous services to soldiers of the French Army of the East who were interned in Switzerland during the Franco-Prussian War.

== Career in the Caribbean ==
Düss was first sent to Martinique in 1865, where he served as a teaching supervisor at the College of Saint-Pierre for one year, and then at the Collège de Fort de France on Martinique from 1866 to 1870. At the end of 1870, during the Franco-Prussian War, he returned to France to complete his theological studies. After making his profession on 1 October 1871, he returned to Martinique at the end of that year. He then served as Prefect of Discipline at the College of Fort-de-France for four years, and in 1875, he was appointed professor of fifth form at Saint-Pierre.

It was during this period that his interest in natural sciences emerged. Though primarily responsible for teaching literature, he assisted the chemistry professor, collected terrestrial and marine shells, and cultivated a small botanical garden that provided materials for his natural history courses.

He soon devoted himself to the study of botany, seeking to gather all the plants of the island in his herbarium. He identified them with the help of works on the flora of the Antilles contained in the library of the Botanical Garden of Saint-Pierre. His days off were spent on herborisation expeditions, which were often arduous due to the heat and dangerous because of the presence of the Fer-de-Lance, a venomous snake common in the region.

In 1889, Düss returned to France for a two-year leave, the only one he would take from 1872 until his death. By this time, he had already established an important herbarium and had sent seeds and numerous specimens of dried or living plants to the Museum of Paris. During his leave, he served as a professor in Beauvais and frequently visited Paris to identify his collections with the assistance of the Museum's herbarium.

== Move to Guadeloupe ==
After obtaining French citizenship in 1890, Düss returned to the College de Basse-Terre on Guadeloupe at the end of 1891, where he remained until the institution closed in 1906. Upon his arrival, he spent four years collecting all the plants of Guadeloupe that he could obtain, then began writing his phanerogamic flora of the French Antilles in 1895. This was a particularly challenging task as he was far from major herbariums and scientific centres and had access to only a limited library. To verify his identifications, he consulted Ignatz Urban, who was beginning his work on the flora of the Antilles.

== Scientific contributions ==
In 1897, the "Flore des Antilles françaises" was published in the Annales du Musée Colonial de Marseille, accompanied by notes from Professor Heckel on the medicinal properties of the plants. The work was well received in the Antilles, with many people subscribing to it, though the edition has long been out of print.

Düss continued his herborising expeditions, planning to eventually produce a second edition of his work while also preparing a cryptogamic flora of the Antilles. To this end, he returned several times to Martinique, which he believed he had not sufficiently explored during his first stay.

He joined the Société botanique de France on 22 December 1893, and on 8 May 1901, the board of directors awarded him the rarely granted title of honorary member.

During 1903, Düss published several papers related to the cryptogams of Guadeloupe and Martinique, providing catalogues of vascular cryptogams, bryophytes, lichens, and fungi, omitting only algae, which had been studied by Mazé.

He collected botanical specimens mainly on Guadeloupe and its dependencies and Martinique, but made also collecting trips to Antigua, Barbuda, Dominica, and Saint Lucia.

== Later life and recognition ==
When the College de Basse-Terre closed in 1906, Düss was appointed chaplain of the Thillac Hospice, where he remained until his death. His final years were devoted to his priestly ministry and charity work. To obtain some money to improve the conditions of the hospice residents, Düss sold his author rights to the "Flore des Antilles" to the Society of Friends of Trees, Sites and Monuments of Martinique for a modest sum.

Düss received official recognition for his services to the Antilles. He was made an Officer of the Academy in 1898 and an Officer of Public Instruction in 1905. At the urging of M. Candace, deputy of Guadeloupe, he was appointed a Knight of the Legion of Honour by decree on 11 March 1924. This news was received with joy in Guadeloupe and Martinique, and local newspapers published laudatory articles about the new legionnaire. He received congratulations from numerous individuals, particularly the Governor of Guadeloupe and the Bishop of Basse-Terre.

Two months later, on 12 May 1924, Antoine Düss died at Castel, Basse-Terre, at the age of 84, leaving unanimous regrets in the French Antilles, where his memory continues to be venerated. Père Düss was born in Hasle, Switzerland, graduated from the Gymnasium in Luzern and entered the Congregation du Saint-Esprit et du Saint-Coeur de Marie in Paris. Titled variably as Abbé, Père (Father) or Reverend, he held teaching positions at the Collége de Fort de France on Martinique and at the College de Basse-Terre on Guadeloupe. He collected botanical specimens mainly on Guadeloupe and its dependencies and Martinique, but made also collecting trips to Antigua, Barbuda, Dominica, and Saint Lucia.

He is honoured in the naming of Dussiella, which is a genus of fungi within the family Clavicipitaceae, and Dussia, a genus of flowering plants in the family Fabaceae.

== Sources ==
- Urban, Ignaz. Notae biographicae, Symb. Antill. 3:14,1900.
- Detailed biography

== Complete bibliography ==
- WorldCat
