= Parepichloe =

Scientific classification
- Kingdom: Fungi
- Division: Ascomycota
- Class: Sordariomycetes
- Order: Hypocreales
- Family: Clavicipitaceae
- Genus: Parepichloe; F.J.White Jr & Reddy (1998)

Type species
- Parepichloe cinerea (Berk. & Broome) J.F.White & P.V.Reddy (1988)

Genus of fungi

Parepichloe is a genus of fungi in the family Clavicipitaceae.
