= Commelinaceomyces =

Scientific classification
- Kingdom: Fungi
- Division: Ascomycota
- Class: Sordariomycetes
- Order: Hypocreales
- Family: Clavicipitaceae
- Genus: Commelinaceomyces; E. Tanaka (2020)

Type species
- Commelinaceomyces aneilematis (S. Ito) E. Tanaka (2020)

Genus of fungi

Commelinaceomyces is a genus of fungi in the family Clavicipitaceae.

Species of this genus cause false smut of some species of Commelinaceae.The type species Commelinaceomyces aneilematis forms sori on flower part of Murdannia keisak.

== Species ==
The index fungorum currently (2021) lists:

1. Commelinaceomyces aneilematis (S. Ito) E. Tanaka (2020)
2. Commelinaceomyces burkillii (Syd., P. Syd. & E.J. Butler) E. Tanaka 2020
3. Commelinaceomyces nawaschinii (Racib.) E. Tanaka 2020
4. Commelinaceomyces rwandensis (T. Majewski & K.A. Nowak) E. Tanaka 2020
