= Dussia =

Scientific classification
- Kingdom: Plantae
- Clade: Tracheophytes
- Clade: Angiosperms
- Clade: Eudicots
- Clade: Rosids
- Order: Fabales
- Family: Fabaceae
- Subfamily: Faboideae
- Tribe: Amburaneae
- Genus: Dussia; Krug & Urb. ex Taub. (1892)

Species
- See text

Synonyms
- Cashalia Standl. (1923); Vexillifera Ducke (1922)

Genus of legumes

Dussia is a genus of flowering plants in the family Fabaceae. It includes 11 species native to the tropical Americas, ranging from central Mexico to Bolivia and west-central Brazil.

The genus name of Dussia is in honour of Antoine Duss (1840–1924), who was a Swiss botanist.

11 species are accepted:

- Dussia atropurpurea N.Zamora, R.T.Penn. & C.H.Stirt.
- Dussia coriacea Pierce
- Dussia cuscatlanica (Standl.) Standl. & Steyerm.
- Dussia discolor (Benth.) Amshoff
- Dussia foxii Rudd
- Dussia lehmannii Harms
- Dussia macroprophyllata (Donn.Sm.) Harms
- Dussia martinicensis Krug & Urb.
- Dussia mexicana (Standl.) Harms
- Dussia sanguinea Urb. & Ekman
- Dussia tessmannii Harms
