= Corallocytostroma =

Scientific classification
- Kingdom: Fungi
- Division: Ascomycota
- Class: Sordariomycetes
- Order: Hypocreales
- Family: Clavicipitaceae
- Genus: Corallocytostroma

Genus of fungi

Corallocytostroma is a genus of fungi in the family Clavicipitaceae.

Species in this genus include:

- Corallocytostroma ornicopreoides
- Corallocytostroma ornithocopreoides
- Corallocytostroma oryzae
