= Sphaerocordyceps =

Scientific classification
- Kingdom: Fungi
- Division: Ascomycota
- Class: Sordariomycetes
- Order: Hypocreales
- Family: Clavicipitaceae
- Genus: Sphaerocordyceps; Kobayasi

Type species
- Sphaerocordyceps palustris (Berk.) Kobayasi

Genus of fungi

Sphaerocordyceps is a genus of fungi within the Clavicipitaceae family.
