= Konradia =

Scientific classification
- Kingdom: Fungi
- Division: Ascomycota
- Class: Sordariomycetes
- Order: Hypocreales
- Family: Clavicipitaceae
- Genus: Konradia; Racib.

Type species
- Konradia bambusina Racib.

Genus of fungi

Konradia is a genus of fungi within the Clavicipitaceae family.
