= Conoideocrella =

Scientific classification
- Kingdom: Fungi
- Division: Ascomycota
- Class: Sordariomycetes
- Order: Hypocreales
- Family: Clavicipitaceae
- Genus: Conoideocrella; D. Johnson et al. (2008)

Genus of fungi

Conoideocrella is a genus of fungi in the family Clavicipitaceae.

Species in this genus include:

- Conoideocrella fenshuilingensis
- Conoideocrella krungchingensis
- Conoideocrella luteorostrata
- Conoideocrella tenuis
