= Metarhiziopsis =

Scientific classification
- Kingdom: Fungi
- Division: Ascomycota
- Class: Sordariomycetes
- Order: Hypocreales
- Family: Clavicipitaceae
- Genus: Metarhiziopsis; D.W. Li, R.S. Cowles & Vossbrinck, (2008)

Genus of fungi

Metarhiziopsis is a genus of fungus in the family Clavicipitaceae.

Species in this genus include:

- Metarhiziopsis microspora
