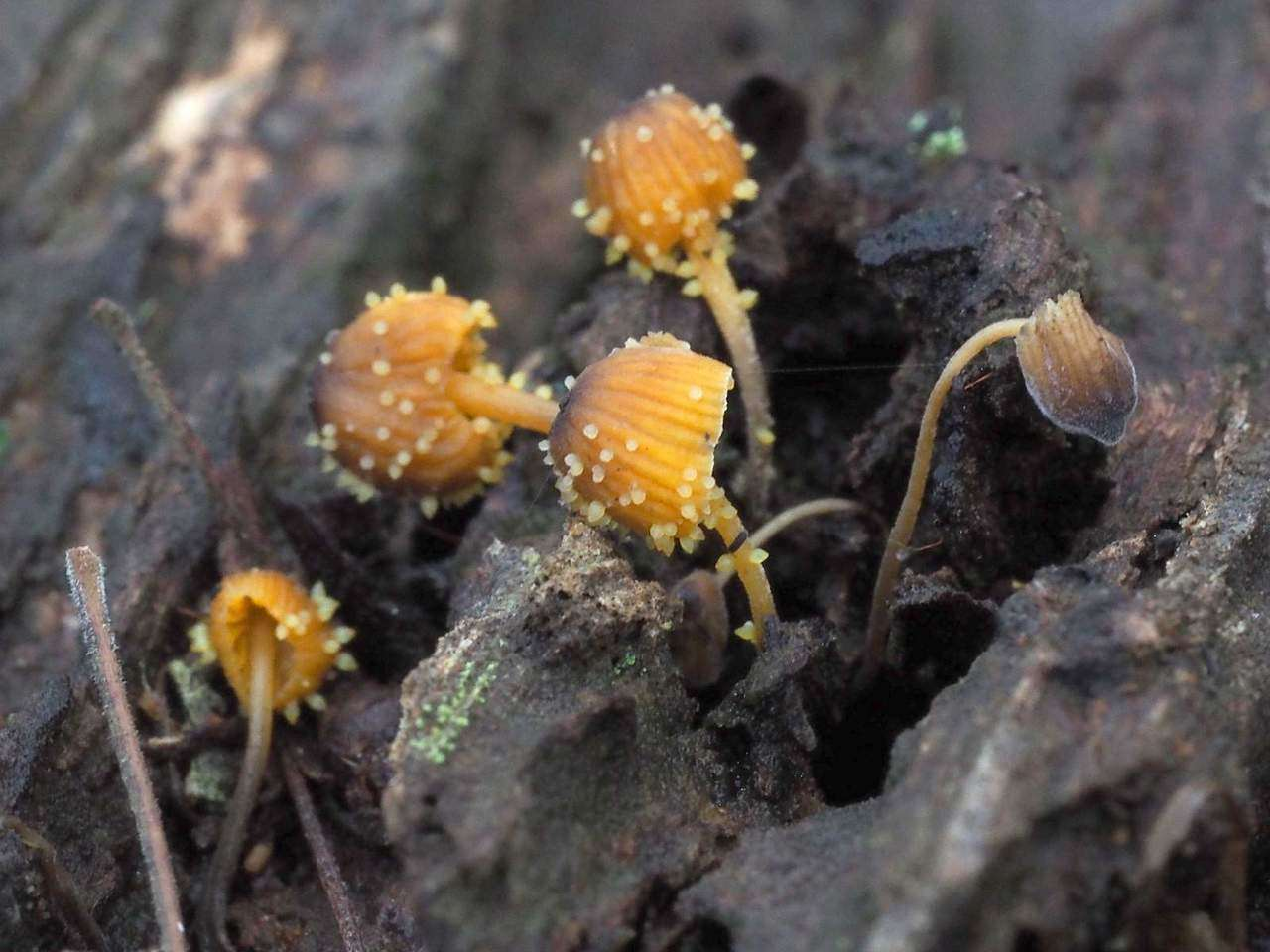
- Neobarya agaricicola

Scientific classification
- Domain: Eukaryota
- Kingdom: Fungi
- Division: Ascomycota
- Class: Sordariomycetes
- Order: Hypocreales
- Family: Clavicipitaceae
- Genus: Neobarya; Lowen (1986)

Type species
- Neobarya parasitica (Fuckel) Lowen (1986)

Synonyms
- Barya Fuckel (1864); Baryella Rauschert (1988)

= Neobarya =

Genus of fungi

Neobarya is a genus of fungi in the family Clavicipitaceae.

== Species ==
- Neobarya agaricicola
- Neobarya aurantiaca
- Neobarya byssicola
- Neobarya ciliaris
- Neobarya danica
- Neobarya darwiniana
- Neobarya lichenophila
- Neobarya lutea
- Neobarya parasitica
- Neobarya peltigerae
- Neobarya usneae
- Neobarya xylariicola
