= Polynema (fungus) =

Scientific classification
- Domain: Eukaryota
- Kingdom: Fungi
- Division: Ascomycota
- Class: Sordariomycetes
- Order: Hypocreales
- Family: Clavicipitaceae
- Genus: Polynema; Lév. (1846)

Species
- See text

Synonyms
- Belaina Bat. & Peres (1961)

Genus of fungi

Polynema is a genus of fungi in the family Clavicipitaceae.

== Species ==
Polynema asclepiadis - Polynema aurelia - Polynema careyae - Polynema hispidulum - Polynema muirii - Polynema ornatum - Polynema perlaceum - Polynema radiatum - Polynema sinense - Polynema triaristatum - Polynema tricristatum - Polynema vitis
