= Moelleriella =

Scientific classification
- Domain: Eukaryota
- Kingdom: Fungi
- Division: Ascomycota
- Class: Sordariomycetes
- Order: Hypocreales
- Family: Clavicipitaceae
- Genus: Moelleriella; Bres.

Type species
- Moelleriella sulphurea Bres.

Synonyms
- Fleischeria Penz. & Sacc. (1902) [1901]; Hemimyriangium J. Reid & Piroz. (1966); Moelleria Bres. (1896)

Genus of fungi

Moelleriella is a genus of fungi within the family Clavicipitaceae.

The genus name of Moelleriella is in honour of Friedrich Alfred Gustav Jobst Möller (1860-1922), who was a German botanist and mycologist, forestry scientist, who travelled and studied in the Diplomatic Service in Brazil.

The genus was circumscribed by Giacomo Bresadola in Syll. Fung. vol.14 on page 626 in 1899.
