= Glossary of phytopathology =

This is a glossary of some of the terms used in phytopathology.

Phytopathology is the study of plant diseases. It is a multi-disciplinary science since prerequisites for disease development are the presence of a susceptible host species, a pathogen and the appropriate environmental conditions. This is known as the disease triangle. Because of this interaction, the terminology used in phytopathology often comes from other disciplines including those dealing with the host species ( botany / plant science, plant physiology), the pathogen (bacteriology, mycology, nematology, virology), the environment and disease management practices (agronomy, soil science, meteorology, environmental science, ecology, plant breeding, pesticides, entomology), and areas of study that apply to both the host and pathogen (molecular biology, genetics, molecular genetics). The result is that most phytopathological glossary include terms from these other disciplines in addition to terms (disease incidence, horizontal resistance, gene-for-gene relationship, blast, scab and so on) that are specific to, or which have a unique meaning in phytopathology. This glossary is no exception. However, for the sake of brevity, it has, for the most part, restricted terms from other disciplines to those that pertain to the pathogen. At some point, these terms should be moved to other glossaries (e.g. glossary of mycology, glossary of nematology, and so on).

== A ==
abiotic
Disease not caused by living organisms
acceptable daily intake
acervulus (pl. acervuli)
The acervulus is an erumpent, cushionlike fruiting body bearing conidiophores, conidia, and sometimes setae. It is distinguished from a stroma in not having a peridium or covering of fungal tissue of any kind.
acid precipitation
acid rain
acropetal
Actinomycetes
The Actinobacteria or Actinomycetes are a group of Gram-positive bacteria.
acute
acute toxicity
aeciospore
aecium
aflatoxin
agar
aggressiveness
air pollution
alkaloids
allele
allelopathy
alternate host
alternative hosts
alternation of generations
amphid
amphigynous
amphimixis
amphimobile
anaerobic
anamorph (adj. anamorphic; syn. imperfect state)
anastomosis (pl. anastomoses)
anthracnoes
antibiotic
antibody
antigen
antiseptic
apothecium
The apothecium is an open, cuplike, or saucer-shaped sexual fungal fruiting body (ascocarp) containing asci.
antiseptic
appressorium (pl. appressoria)
arbuscular mycorrhiza (abbr. AM; syn. endomycorrhiza)
arbuscule
ascocarp (syn. ascoma)
ascogenous
ascogonium (pl. ascogonia)
ascoma (pl. ascomata; syn. ascocarp)
Ascomycetes
asci
ascospore
ascostroma (pl. ascostromata)
ascus (pl. asci)
aseptate
asexual
asexual reproduction
atrophy
AUDPC (abbr. for Area Under Disease Progress Curve)
autotroph
avirulence (avr) gene
avirulent (syn. nonpathogenic)
axenic
autoecious

== B ==
bacilliform
bacterial streaming
bactericide
bacteriocin
bacteriophage
bacterium (pl. bacteria)
bactericide
basal knob (syn. stylet knob)
basidiocarp (syn. basidioma)
Basidiomyctes
The Division Basidiomycota is a large taxon within the Kingdom Fungi that includes those species that produce spores in a club-shaped structure called a basidium.
basidiospore
basidium (pl. basidia)
basidiospore
basidium (pl. basidia; adj. basidial)
binary fission
binucleate
bioassay
biocide
biocontrol (syn. biological control)
biotic
A disease caused by a living organism
biotroph (syn. obligate parasite)
biotype
bitunicate
blasting
blight
blotch
breaking
broadcast application
brooming
brown rot (of wood)
burn
bursa

== C ==
canker
capsid (syn. coat protein)
carcinogen
carrier
casting
causal agent
certification
cfu (abbr. for colony forming unit)
chemotaxis (syn. chemotropism)
chemotherapy
chlamydospore
chlamydospore
A chlamydospore is the thick-walled big resting spore of several kinds of fungi.
chlorosis
chronic toxicity
chytridiomycetes
circulative-propagative transmission (syn. propagative transmission)
circulative transmission (syn. persistent transmission)
cirrus
cleistothecium
clamp connection
clavate (or claviform)
coalesce
coat protein (syn. capsid)
coccus (pl. cocci)
coelomycetes
colonization
colony
colony forming unit (abbr. cfu)
compartmentalization
conidiogenesis
conidiogenous
conidioma (pl. conidiomata)
conidiophore
conidium (pl. conidia)
conjugation
conk
constitutive
contact fungicide (syn. protectant fungicide)
coremium (pl. coremia; syn. synnema)
cross-protection
crozier
cryptobiosis (hidden life)
curl
cyst
cytopathology

== D ==
damping-off
days to harvest
decay
degree-day
demicyclic
deuteromycetes (syn. Fungi Imperfecti)
diagnostic
antigen
diploid
Diploid (2x) cells have two copies (homologs) of each chromosome, usually one from the mother and one from the father.
diapause
dieback (v. die back)
differential host (syn. differential cultivar)
differential medium
differentiation
dikaryon (adj. dikaryotic)
dilution plating
dilution streaking
dimorphic
direct penetration
Discomycetes
disease
disease cycle
disease incidence
disease progress curve
disease pyramid
disease severity
disease triangle
disinfect
disinfest
dispersal (syn. dissemination)
dissemination (syn. dispersal)
dolipore septum
dormancy (adj. dormant)
downy mildew
drift (of pesticides)
drought
durable resistance
dwarfing

== E ==
echinulate
economic threshold
ectomycorrhiza (pl. ectomycorrhizae)
ectoparasite
ectotrophic
elicitor
enation
encapsidate
encyst
endemic
endogenous
endophytic
endoconidium (pl. endoconidia)
endomycorrhiza (pl. endomycorrhizae; syn. arbuscular mycorrhiza)
endoparasite
endospore
epidemic
epidemiology
epinasty
epiphytotic
The epidemic condition of a disease, in a plant population. Compare with enphytotic
eradicant
eradication
ergot
ergotism
erumpent
escape
etiolation
etiology
exclusion
exogenous
exudate

== F ==
f. sp. (abbr. for forma specialis)
facultative parasite
facultative saprotroph
fasciation
fastidious
filamentous (syn. filiform)
flagellum
flagging
fleck
focus (pl. foci)
forest decline
forma specialis (abbr. f.sp.; pl. formae speciales)
fructification
fruiting body
fumigant (v. fumigate)
Fungi Imperfecti (syn. Deuteromycetes
fungicide (adj. fungicidal)
Chemical designed to kill fungi
fungus (pl. fungi)
fungistat (adj. fungistatic)
Inhibits growth of some fungi.
fungistasis
fusiform

== G ==
gall
gametangium (pl. gametangia)
gametophyte
gene-for-gene hypothesis
general resistance (syn. horizontal resistance, race non-specific resistance)
genotype
germ theory
giant cell
girdle
giant cells
gram-negative
Gram-negative bacteria are those that do not retain crystal violet dye in the Gram staining protocol.
gram-positive
Gram-positive bacteria are classified as bacteria that retain a crystal violet dye during the Gram stain process.
gram stain
growth regulator (syn. hormone)
gummosis (pl. gummoses)

== H ==
haploid
hardiness
haustorium (pl. haustoria)
The haustorium is the hyphal tip of a parasitic fungus
hemiparasite
hermaphrodite (adj. hermaphroditic)
heteroecious
heterokaryon (adj. heterokaryotic)
heterothallic
heterotroph
holomorph
holoparasite
homokaryon (adj. homokaryotic)
homothallism (adj. homothallic)
horizontal resistance (syn. general resistance, race non-specific resistance)
host plant
host range
hyaline
hymenium
hyperparasite
hyperplasia
hypertrophy
hypersensitive
hypersensitive reaction and pathogenicity (hrp) gene
hypersensitive response (HR)
hypha
hyphal sheath (syn. mantle)
hyphomycetes
hyphopodium
hypoplasia
hypovirulence
hypovirulence is reduced virulence of a pathogen. Hypovirulence in fungi can be caused by a virus within the fungus. The virus reduces virulence and sporulation. A hypovirus-fungus can be used in biological control.

== I ==
immune
immunity
imperfect fungi (syn. Fungi Imperfecti, deuteromycetes)
imperfect state (syn. anamorph)
in planta
in situ
in vitro
in vivo
incubation period
indicator plant
indirect penetration
induced
induced systemic resistance (ISR)
infection court
infection cushion
infection focus
infection peg (syn. penetration peg)
infection period
infectious
infective
infest (n. infestation)
initial inoculum (syn. primary inoculum)
injury
inoculate (n. inoculation)
inoculum (pl. inocula)
inoculum density
integrated pest management (abbr. IPM)
intumescence (syn. edema or oedema)
IPM (abbr. for integrated pest management)
isolate

== K ==
klendusity
The disease-escaping ability of plants.
Koch's postulates
knot

== L ==
latent infection
latent period
leaf dip
leaf spot
leafroll
lesion
life cycle
lignification
local lesion
local necrosis
lodge

== M ==
macerate
macroconidium (pl. macroconidia)
macrocyclic
macronutrient
mantle (syn. hyphal sheath)
mating types
mechanical injury
mechanical transmission
medium (pl. media)
melanin
microbial
microclimate
microconidium (pl. microconidia)
microcyclic
microflora
micronutrient
microorganism (syn. microbe)
microsclerotium
mildew
MLO (syn. mycoplasmalike organism)
mold
mollicute
monocyclic
monoecious
monogenic
monogenic resistance (syn. single gene resistance)
monotrichous
monoxenic culture
mosaic
motile
mottle
movement protein
multigenic resistance (syn. polygenic resistance)
multiline
multinucleate
multiparticulate virus
multipartite virus
multiseptate
mummification
mummy
mushroom
mutagen
Mycelia sterilia
mycelium (pl. mycelia)
Mycelium is the vegetative part of a fungus consisting of a mass of branching, threadlike hyphae that exists below the ground or within another substrate.
mycology
mycoparasite
mycoplasmalike organism (syn. MLO)
mycorrhiza (pl. mycorrhizae; adj. mycorrhizal)
mycotoxin
mycovirus
Myxomycetes (syn. slime molds)

== N ==
necrosis (adj. necrotic)
necrotroph
needle cast (of conifers)
nematicide
A nematicide is a type of chemical pesticide used to kill parasitic nematodes.
nematode
Nematodes are unsegmented, bilaterally symmetric and triploblastic protostomes with a complete digestive system.
nitrogen oxides
noninfectious disease
nonpathogenic (syn. avirulent)
nonpersistent transmission (syn. stylet-borne transmission)
nonseptate

== O ==
obligate parasite (syn. biotroph)
occlusion
oedema (also edema; syn. intumescence)
oligogenic resistance
oogonium (pl. oogonia)
An oogonium is a female gametogonium.
oomycetes (adj. oomycetous)
oospore
ooze
ostiole (adj. ostiolate)
overwinter

== P ==
pandemic
papilla
paragynous
parasexualism
parasite (adj. parasitic)
parasitism
parthenogenesis (adj. parthenogenetic)
partial resistance
pasteurization
pathogen (adj. pathogenic)
pathogenesis-related (PR) proteins
pathogenicity
pathology
pathotype
pathovar (abbr. pv.)
penetration
penetration peg (syn. infection peg)
perfect (see teleomorph)
perithecium (pl. perithecia)
peritrichate
persistent transmission (syn. circulative transmission)
pest
pesticide
phenological synchrony
phenotype
phloem necrosis
Phycomycete
phyllody
phylloplane-competent
physiogenic disease
phytoalexin
phytopathogenic
phytopathology (syn. plant pathology)
phytoplasma (syn. mycoplasmalike organism, MLO)
phytosanitary certificate
phytotoxic
plant pathology (syn. phytopathology)
plasmodiophoromycetes
plasmodium (pl. plasmodia)
polycyclic
polyetic
polygenic resistance (syn. multigenic resistance)
polymorphism
polyprotein
powdery mildew
predispose (n. predisposition)
primary inoculum (syn. initial inoculum)
proinhibitin
prokaryote
promycelium (pl. promycelia)
propagative transmission (syn. circulative propagative transmission)
propagule
protectant
protectant fungicide (syn. contact fungicide)
pseudothecium (pl. pseudothecia)
Puccinia pathway
pustule
pv. (abbr. for pathovar)
pycnidiospore
pycnium (pl. pycnia; syn. spermagonium)

== Q ==
qualitative resistance
quantitative resistance
quarantine
quiescent
quiescent
dormant or inactive
quorum sensing

== R ==
race
race non-specific resistance (syn. general resistance, horizontal resistance)
receptive hypha
reniform
resinosis
resistant (n. resistance)
rhizomorph
rhizosphere
rhizosphere-competent
ringspot
rosette
rot
roundworm
rugose
russet
rust

== S ==
sanitation
sap transmission
saprobe (syn. saprotroph)
saprotroph
A saprotroph (or saprobe) is an organism that obtains its nutrients from non-living organic matter, usually dead and decaying plant or animal matter, by absorbing soluble organic compounds.
scab
scald
sclerenchyma (adj. sclerenchymatous)
sclerotium (pl. sclerotia)
A sclerotium is a compact mass of hardened mycelium (as an ergot) stored with reserve food material that in some higher fungi becomes detached and remains dormant until a favorable opportunity for growth occurs.
scorch
secondary infection
secondary inoculum
secondary metabolite
secondary organism
seed treatment
seedborne
selective medium
septate
serrate
sessile
seta (pl. setae)
severity values
sexual spore
sexually compatible
shot-hole
sign
single gene resistance (syn. monogenic resistance)
slime molds (syn. Myxomycetes)
smut
soft rot
soil drench
soilborne
soil pasteurization
soil sterilization
solarization
sooty mold
sorus (pl. sori)
sp. (abbr. for species; pl. spp.)
species
specific resistance (syn. vertical resistance)
spermagonium (pl. spermagonia; syn. pycnium for rust fungi)
spermatium (pl. spermatia; syn. pycniospore for rust fungi)
spicule
spiroplasma – helical, motile, cell wall-less bacterium; member of genus Spiroplasma in class Mollicutes
sporangiophore
sporangiospore
sporangium (pl. sporangia)
spore
sporidium (pl.sporidia)
sporocarp
spore-bearing fruiting body
sporodochium (pl.sporodochia)
sporogenous
sporophore
sporophyte
sporulate
spot
stabilizing selection
staghead
stem pitting
sterigma (pl. sterigmata)
sterilant
sterile fungus
sterilization (adj. sterilized)
stippling
strain
streak
striate (n. striations)
stroma (pl. stromata)
stunting
stylet knob (syn. basal knob)
stylet-borne transmission (syn. nonpersistent transmission)
subspecies
substrate
sunscald or sunburn
suppressive soil
susceptible (n. susceptibility)
symptom
symptomless carrier
syncytium (pl. syncytia)
synergism (adj. synergistic)
synnema (pl. synnemata; syn. coremium)
systematics
systemic
systemic acquired resistance (SAR)
systemic fungicide

== T ==
teleomorph (syn. perfect state)
teliospore (sometimes called teleutospore, teleutosporodesm)
Teliospore (sometimes called teleutospore) is the thick-walled resting spore of some fungi (rusts and smuts), from which the basidium arises.
telium (pl. telia)
temporary wilt
thallus
thermotherapy
tolerance (adj. tolerant)
toxicity
toxin
transmit (n. transmission)
trap crop
transmit (n. transmission)
trenching
tumor (syn. gall)
type

== U ==
urediniospore (also urediospore, uredospore)
uredinium (also uredium; pl. uredinia)

== V ==
vascular wilt disease
vector
vein banding
vein clearing
vermiform
vertical resistance (syn. specific resistance)
viable (n. viability)
virescence
virion
viroid
viroplasm
virulence
virulent
viruliferous
virus-laden, usually applied to insects or nematodes as vectors
virus
A virus is a microscopic particle (ranging in size from 20 – 300 nm) that can infect the cells of a biological organism.
viscin

== W ==
walling-off
water-soaked
white rot (of wood)
white rust
wild type
wilt
winterburn
witches' broom
wound

== X ==
XLB (xylem-limited fastidious bacteria)
xylem-limited fastidious bacteria (XLB)

== Y ==
yellowing
yellows

== Z ==
zonate
zoosporangium
zoospore
A zoospore is a motile asexual spore utilizing a flagellum for locomotion.
Zygomycetes
zygospore
A zygospore is a sexual part of a fungus, a chlamydospore that is created by the nuclear fusion of haploid hyphae of different mating types.
