= Baria, Chittagong =

Baria
- Village
- Location of Baria, Chittagong, Bangladesh
- Coordinates: 22°15′44″N 91°57′55″E
- Country: Bangladesh
- Division: Chittagong Division
- Time zone: UTC+6 (DST)

Baria is a village in Chittagong Division, Bangladesh.
