= Baria massacre =

Coordinates: 23.97°N 90.50°E

Baria massacre বাড়িয়া গণহত্যা
- Part of Bangladesh genocide
- Location: Baria, Dhaka Division, Bangladesh
- Date: 14 May 1971 (UTC+6:00)
- Target: Bengali Hindus
- Attack type: Massacre
- Weapon: Rifles
- Deaths: c. 200
- Injuries: Hundreds
- Perpetrator: Pakistani Army

Baria massacre (Bengali: বাড়িয়া গণহত্যা) was the massacre of unarmed Bengali Hindus in the village of Baria in present-day Gazipur Sadar Upazila of Bangladesh by the Pakistan army on 14 May 1971. Around 200 Bengali Hindus from Baria and nearby Kamaria were killed in the massacre, while hundreds more were injured.

== Background ==
The village of Baria fell under Joydebpur sub-division of Dhaka district. At present it falls under Gazipur District of Dhaka Division. It is located at a distance of 8 km from the palace of Bhawal estate in Gazipur. In 1971, Baria was an almost exclusively Hindu inhabited village. The Pakistan army launched Operation Searchlight on 25 May. They set up a cantonment at the Bhawal estate.

== Killings ==
On 14 May at around 1 pm, help of Awal nearly 500 Pakistani soldiers from the army cantonment at Bhawal estate to Baria. After entering the village, the troops spread out in all directions and opened fire on the villagers. Many died on the spot while others were seriously injured. The perpetrators looted the houses and set most of them on fire. Some of the villagers attempted to flee by crossing the Belai beel. The troops opened fire on them as well. The belongings of the fleeing villagers were looted by the Pakistan army and the collaborators. The army shelled a water pump at the Belai beel mistaking it as a cannon.

The mayhem continued till 6 pm. At around 7:30 pm there was a heavy downpour. The indiscriminate shooting left around 200 villagers of Baria and Kamaria dead, including women and children. Hundreds of people were wounded in the gun fire.

== Aftermath ==
As the news of army killings in Baria spread to nearby villages, the Hindus left the villages and fled to relatively safer places.
