= Balansiopsis =

Scientific classification
- Kingdom: Fungi
- Division: Ascomycota
- Class: Sordariomycetes
- Order: Hypocreales
- Family: Clavicipitaceae
- Genus: Balansiopsis; Höhn (1910)

Genus of fungi

Balansiopsis is a genus of fungi in the family Clavicipitaceae.

Species in this genus include:

- Balansiopsis ascelerotiaca
- Balansiopsis asclerotiaca
- Balansiopsis asclerotica
- Balansiopsis gaduae
- Balansiopsis guareae
- Balansiopsis pilulaeformis
- Balansiopsis piluliformis
- Balansiopsis schumanniana
