= Atkinsonella =

Scientific classification
- Kingdom: Fungi
- Division: Ascomycota
- Class: Sordariomycetes
- Order: Hypocreales
- Family: Clavicipitaceae
- Genus: Atkinsonella; Diehl

Type species
- Atkinsonella hypoxylon (Peck) Diehl

Genus of fungi

Atkinsonella is a genus of fungi within the Clavicipitaceae family.
