= Metapochonia =

Scientific classification
- Kingdom: Fungi
- Division: Ascomycota
- Class: Sordariomycetes
- Order: Hypocreales
- Family: Clavicipitaceae
- Genus: Metapochonia; Kepler, S.A. Rehner & Humber (2014)

Genus of fungi

Metapochonia is a genus of fungus in the family Clavicipitaceae.

Species in this genus include:

- Metapochonia bulbillosa
- Metapochonia cordycepisociata
- Metapochonia cordycipiticonsociata
- Metapochonia goniodes
- Metapochonia hahajimaensis
- Metapochonia lutea
- Metapochonia microbactrospora
- Metapochonia parasitica
- Metapochonia rubescens
- Metapochonia simonovicovae
- Metapochonia suchlasporia
- Metapochonia variabilis
