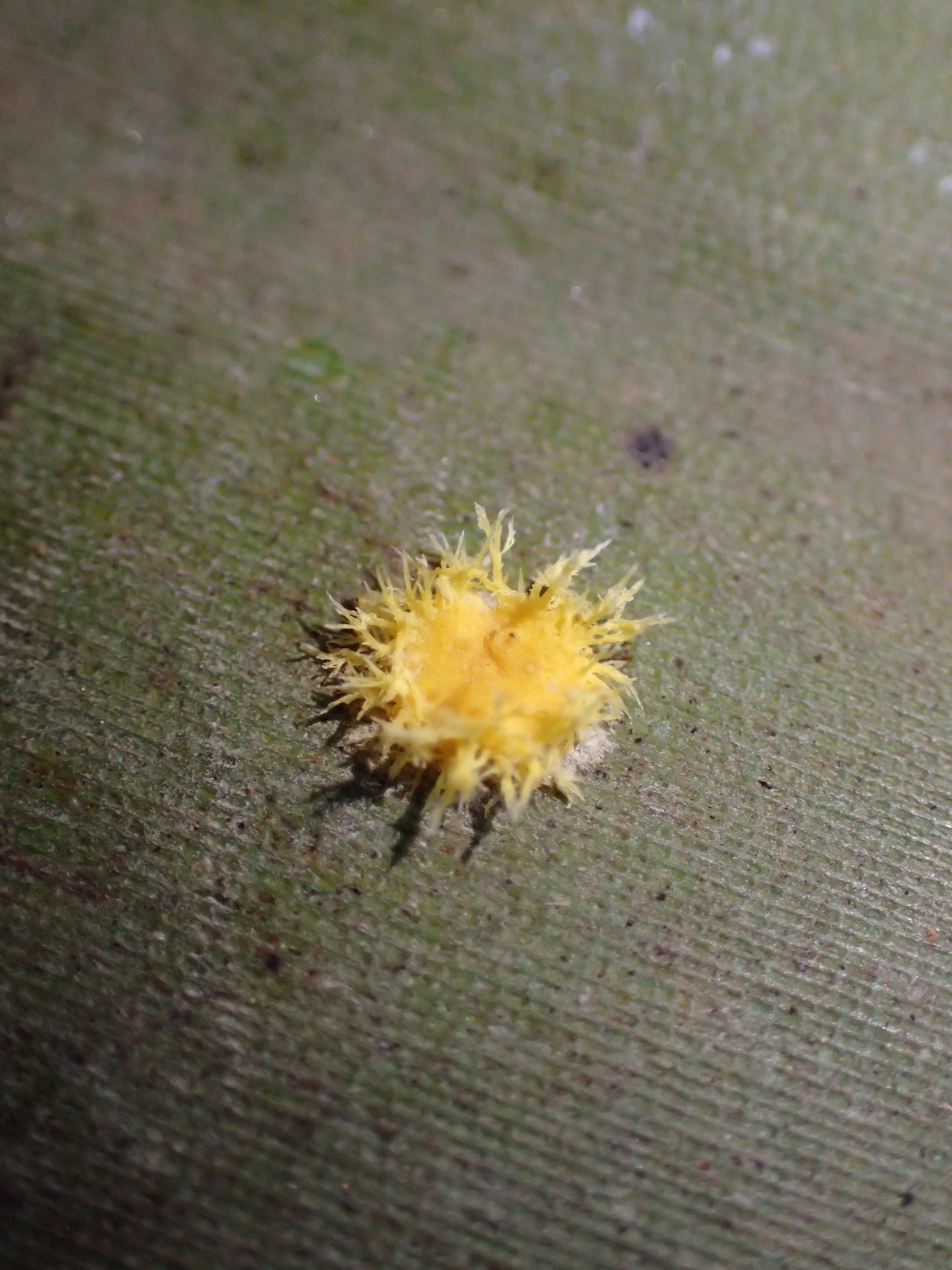

Scientific classification
- Domain: Eukaryota
- Kingdom: Fungi
- Division: Ascomycota
- Class: Sordariomycetes
- Order: Hypocreales
- Family: Clavicipitaceae
- Genus: Hypocrella; Sacc., 1878

Synonyms
- Hypocreophis Speg. (1918); Perisporiella (Henn.) Clem. & Shear (1931); Perisporium subgen. Perisporiella Henn. (1902)

= Hypocrella =

Genus of fungi

Hypocrella is a genus of fungi in the family Clavicipitaceae.

== Species ==
The following species are recognised in the genus Hypocrella:

- Hypocrella africana Hywel-Jones & Samuels (1998)
- Hypocrella amazonica Henn. (1904)
- Hypocrella ambiens Theiss. (1911)
- Hypocrella andropogonis (Henn.) Petch (1922)
- Hypocrella aurantiaca (Petch) Mains (1959)
- Hypocrella aurea Syd. & P. Syd. (1917)
- Hypocrella brasiliana (Henn.) Mains (1959)
- Hypocrella calendulina Hywel-Jones & Mongkols. (2009)
- Hypocrella camerunensis Henn. (1897)
- Hypocrella cavernosa Möller (1901)
- Hypocrella chusqueae Petr. (1948)
- Hypocrella cornea Petch (1937)
- Hypocrella coronata Höhn. (1907)
- Hypocrella cretacea Höhn. (1909)
- Hypocrella disciformis P. Chaverri & K.T. Hodge (2008)
- Hypocrella discoidea (Berk. & Broome) Sacc. (1878)
- Hypocrella engleriana Koord. (1907)
- Hypocrella fluminensis J.C. Krug (1940)
- Hypocrella glabrescens Petch (1939)
- Hypocrella globosa Racib. (1907)
- Hypocrella grewiae Koord. (1907)
- Hypocrella hirsuta P. Chaverri & K.T. Hodge (2008)
- Hypocrella insignis Syd. & P. Syd. (1917)
- Hypocrella japonica Lloyd (1924)
- Hypocrella juruana Henn. (1905)
- Hypocrella luteola Hywel-Jones & Mongkols. (2009)
- Hypocrella lutulenta Höhn. (1920)
- Hypocrella marginalis Henn. (1904)
- Hypocrella melaena Syd. & P. Syd. (1913)
- Hypocrella murrayae Kobayasi (1973)
- Hypocrella nectrioides Thaxt. (1921)
- Hypocrella nutans (Rick) Theiss. (1911)
- Hypocrella orbicularis Syd. & P. Syd. (1911)
- Hypocrella panamensis M.S. Torres, J.F. Bisch. & J.F. White (2007)
- Hypocrella philippinensis Petch (1932)
- Hypocrella phyllophila Theiss. (1911)
- Hypocrella plana Syd. & P. Syd. (1917)
- Hypocrella prasina Bat., J.L. Bezerra & C.R. Almeida (1964)
- Hypocrella rubiginosa A.L. Sm. (1901)
- Hypocrella salaccensis (Racib.) Petch (1913)
- Hypocrella siamensis Hywel-Jones & Mongkols. (2009)
- Hypocrella sphaeroidea Syd. & P. Syd. (1917)
- Hypocrella tamoneae Earle (1910)
- Hypocrella tenuispora P.G. Liu & Zu Q. Li (2001)
- Hypocrella vilis Syd. & P. Syd. (1917)
- Hypocrella viridans (Berk. & M.A. Curtis) Petch (1921)
- Hypocrella warneckeana Henn. (1905)
- Hypocrella weberbaueri Henn. (1908)
- Hypocrella zimmermanniana Henn. (1902)
- Hypocrella zingiberis Massee (1899)
