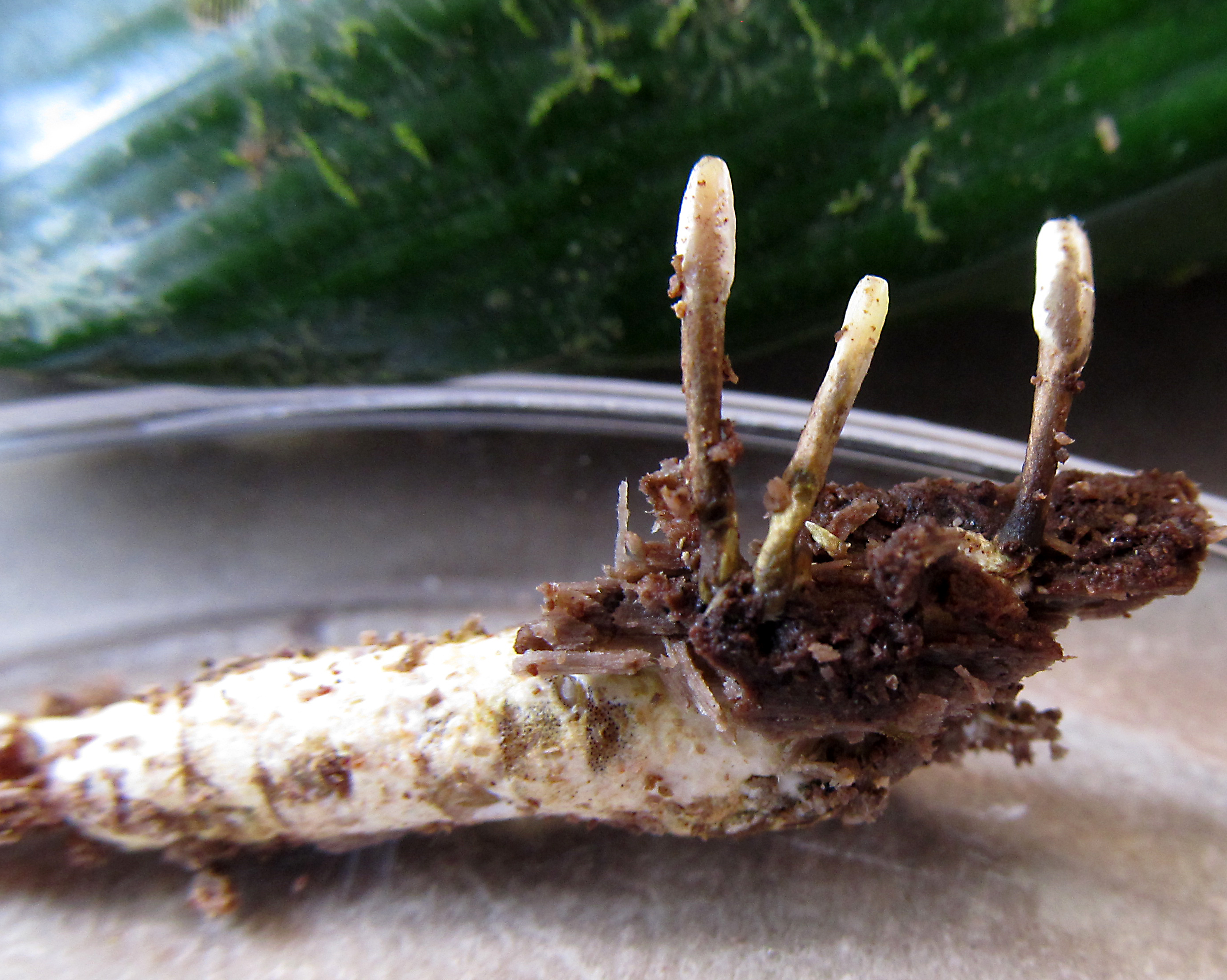

Scientific classification
- Kingdom: Fungi
- Division: Ascomycota
- Class: Sordariomycetes
- Order: Hypocreales
- Family: Clavicipitaceae
- Genus: Metacordyceps; G.H.Sung, J.M.Sung, Hywel-Jones & Spatafora (2007)

Type species
- Metacordyceps taii (Z.Q.Liang & A.Y.Liu) G.H.Sung, J.M.Sung, Hywel-Jones & Spatafora (2007)

Synonyms
- Diheterospora Kamyschko ex G.L. Barron & Onions (1966); Diheterospora Kamyschko (1962)

= Metacordyceps =

Genus of fungi

Metacordyceps is a genus of fungi in the family Clavicipitaceae. The anamorphs of Metacordyceps appear to include Metarhizium species.

Metacordyceps species attack insects in the orders Coleoptera and Lepidoptera, hosts that are common throughout all Cordyceps-like fungi.

== Species ==
Genus proposed in 2012:

- M. chlamydosporia
- M. dhauladharensis
- M. liangshanensis – Proposals for transferring to Metacordyceps and Papiliomyces relied on improperly authenticated material. True type material belongs in Ophiocordyceps.
- M. taii
