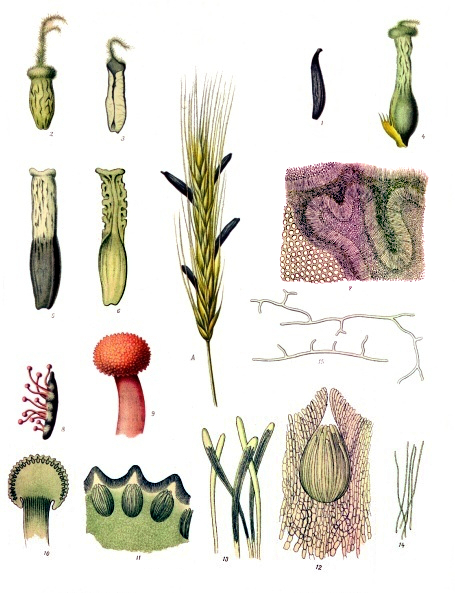
- Claviceps purpurea

Scientific classification
- Kingdom: Fungi
- Division: Ascomycota
- Class: Sordariomycetes
- Order: Hypocreales
- Family: Clavicipitaceae (Lindau) Earle (1901)

Type genus
- Claviceps Tul. (1853)

Genera
- See text

= Clavicipitaceae =

Family of fungi

The Clavicipitaceae are a family of fungi within the order Hypocreales. A 2008 estimate placed 43 genera in the family, but a study in 2020 has increased this number to 50.

== Phylogeny ==
Molecular phylogenetic analysis of multigene DNA sequence data indicates the taxon Clavicipitaceae (as circumscribed by 2007) is paraphyletic, and consists of three well-defined clades, at least one of which is shared with members of another fungal family (Hypocreaceae). The most recent common ancestor of the three clades also include Hypocreaceae as a descendant.

Outline of phylogeny from Sung et al. (2007a)

- Hypocreales
  - Bionectriaceae
  - - Nectriaceae
    - - - Hypocreaceae
        - Clavicipitaceae clade C
      - - Clavicipitaceae clade A
        - Clavicipitaceae clade B

The issue seems to have been resolved in Sung et al. (2007b). Clavicipitaceae becomes restricted to "clade A". Cordycipitaceae is resurrected to hold "clade C". Ophiocordycipitaceae is created to hold "clade B".

== Evolution ==
The evolution within the Clavicipitaceae (as circumscribed by 2007) is marked by interkingdom host jumping, and the range of this large and heterogeneous fungal group spans mutualistic plant symbionts, as well as parasites of plants, insects, and other fungi. This situation has since been corrected

== Significance ==
Many of its members produce alkaloids toxic to animals and humans. One of its most infamous species is Claviceps purpurea, which has historical significance as the cause of St. Anthony's fire, also known as ergotism. Ergotism is caused by ergot alkaloids, such as ergotamine and ergocristine, which are chemical derivatives of lysergic acid. Metarhizium species are widely used in the biological control of insect pests.

== Genera ==
Several genera, especially those previously described as "anamorphic" (having no known sexual cycle) are now re-classified into other families, in light of current molecular and other evidence. As of November 2024, the following genera are placed in the family Clavicipitaceae:

- Aciculosporium I. Miyake (1908)
- Allocordyceps Poinar (2021)
- Aschersonia Mont. (1848) - Sung clade A2
- Atkinsonella Diehl (1950)
- Balansia Speg. (1885) - Sung clade A1
- Balansiopsis Höhn. (1910)
- Berkelella (Sacc.) Sacc. (1891)
- Cavimalum Yoshim. Doi, Dargan & K.S. Thind (1977)
- Claviceps Tul. (1853) - Sung clade A1
- Commelinaceomyces E. Tanaka (2020)
- Conoideocrella D. Johnson, G.H. Sung, Hywel-Jones & Spatafora (2009)
- Corallocytostroma Y.N. Yu & Z.Y. Zhang (1980)
- Drechmeria W. Gams & H.-B. Jansson (1985)
- Dussiella Pat. (1890)
- Ephelis Fr. (1849)
- Epichloe (Fr.) Tul. & C. Tul. (1865)
- Epicrea Petr. (1950) - Sung clade A1
- Harposporium Lohde (1874)
- Helicocollum Luangsa-ard, Mongkols., Noisrip. & Thanak. (2017)
- Helminthascus Tranzschel (1898)
- Heteroepichloe E. Tanaka, C. Tanaka, Gafur & Tsuda (2002)
- Hypocrella Sacc. (1878) - Sung clade A2
- Keithomyces Samson, Luangsa-ard & Houbraken (2020)
- Konradia Racib. (1900)
- Linearistroma Höhn. 1910)
- Loculistroma F. Patt. & Charles (1910)
- Marquandomyces Samson, Houbraken & Luangsa-ard (2020)
- Metacordyceps G.H. Sung, J.M. Sung, Hywel-Jones & Spatafora (2007)
- Metapochonia Kepler, S.A. Rehner & Humber (2014)
- Metarhiziopsis D.W. Li, R.S. Cowles & C.R. Vossbrinck (2008)
- Metarhizium Sorokīn (1879) - Sung clade A3
- Moelleriella Bres. (1897)
- Morakotia Mongkols., Noisrip., Khons., Thanakitp. & Luangsa-ard (2021)
- Mycomalus A. Möller (1901)
- MycophilomycesCrous & M.J. Wingf. (2016)
- Myriogenospora G.F. Atk. (1894)
- Neoaraneomyces W.H. Chen, Y.F. Han, J.D. Liang & Z.Q. Liang (2022)
- Neobarya Lowen (1986)
- Neocordyceps Kobayasi (1984)
- Nigelia Luangsa-ard, Tasan. & Thanak. (2017)
- Nigrocornus Ryley & Langdon (2003)
- Orbiocrella D. Johnson, G.H. Sung, Hywel-Jones & Spatafora (2009)
- †Palaeoclaviceps Poinar, S.C. Alderman & J. Wunderl. (2015)
- Parametarhizium S. Gao, W. Meng, Li Xiang Zhang, Q. Yue & L.J. Xu (2021)
- Parepichloe J.F. White & P.V. Reddy (1998)
- Petchia Thanakitp., Mongkols. & Luangsa-ard (2020)
- Pochonia Bat. & O.M. Fonseca (1965)
- Polynema Lév. (1846)
- Pseudomeria G.L. Barron (1980)
- Pseudometarhizium W.H. Chen, Y.F. Han, J.D. Liang & Z.Q. Liang (2022)
- Purpureomyces Luangsa-ard, Samson & Thanakitp. (2020)
- Regiocrella P. Chaverri & K.T. Hodge (2006)
- Romanoa Thirum. (1954)
- Rotiferophthora G.L. Barron (1991)
- Samuelsia P. Chaverri & K.T. Hodge (2008)
- Shimizuomyces Kobayasi (1981) - Sung clade A4
- Sphaerocordyceps Kobayasi (1981)
- Stereocrea Syd. & P. Syd. (1917)
- Sungia Luangsa-ard, Samson & Thanakitp. (2020)
- Tyrannicordyceps Kepler & Spatafora (2012)
- Ustilaginoidea Bref. (1895)
- Yosiokobayasia Samson, Luangsa-ard & Thanakitp (2020)

== Nomenclatural note ==
As of April 2025, MycoBank holds the unusual opinion that Clavicipitaceae should be synonymized to Clavicipiteae Lindau (1987), a subfamily under Hypocreaceae. This does not match the phylogenetic tree and reassignment of Sung.

== Other sources ==
- C.J. Alexopolous, Charles W. Mims, M. Blackwell et al., Introductory Mycology, 4th ed. (John Wiley and Sons, Hoboken NJ, 2004) ISBN 978-0-471-52229-4
