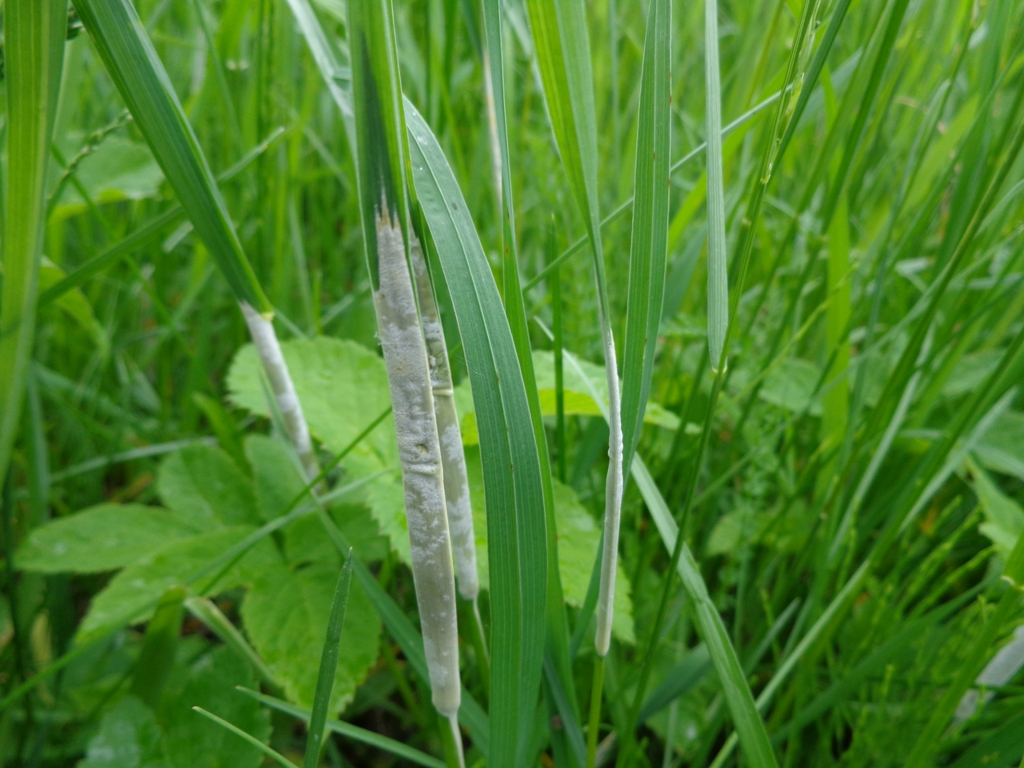
- Detail of Epichloë bromicola 'choke' on grass seedheads

Scientific classification
- Domain: Eukaryota
- Kingdom: Fungi
- Division: Ascomycota
- Class: Sordariomycetes
- Order: Hypocreales
- Family: Clavicipitaceae
- Genus: Epichloë
- Species: E. bromicola

Binomial name
- Epichloë bromicola Leuchtm. & Schardl

Synonyms
- Epichloë yangzii W. Li & Z.W. Wang

= Epichloë bromicola =

Species of fungus

Epichloë bromicola is a haploid sexual species in the fungal genus Epichloë.

A systemic and seed-transmissible grass symbiont first described in 1998, Epichloë bromicola is a sister lineage to Epichloë elymi.

Epichloë bromicola is found from Europe to Asia, where it has been identified in many species of grasses. In Europe, it has been associated with Bromus benekenii, Bromus erectus, Bromus ramosus, Elymus repens, Hordelymus europaeus and Hordeum brevisubulatum. In Asia, it has been found in Leymus chinensis and Elymus tsukushiensis. The sexual phase has been observed on Bromus erectus, Elymus repens and Elymus tsukushiensis. Seed transmission has been seen in Bromus benekenii, Bromus ramosus, Hordelymus europaeus, Hordeum brevisubulatum, Leymus chinensis and Elymus tsukushiensis, but is known to be absent in Bromus erectus and Elymus repens.
