= Niche microdifferentiation =

Genetic diversity process

Niche microdifferentiation is the process a species undergoes to reach genetic diversity within that species; it is the process by which an ecotype is created. This process is regulated by various environmental influences whether they be morphological, spatial, and/or temporal. This means that a trait of one organism in one area is not advantageous for the same species in a different location: "the trait that alters the environment in a manner that is favorable to growth tends to be reinforced and this positive feedback can further, to a certain extent, modify the selection pressure on itself". For example, a species of moth which is white and lives in an area where tree bark is stripped and tree color is white will more easily survive than a white moth in a different location where trees are moss-covered and green. This leads to adaptations that allow the species to exist in a slightly different environment. Organisms within the same species can undergo phenotypic and genotypic changes due to niche microdifferentiation. Conspecific organisms can vary in color, size, diet, behavior, and morphology due to differences in environmental pressures. Related topics include epigenetics, niche differentiation, and evolutionary biology.

== Examples of niche microdifferentiation ==
=== Humans ===
The Iberian Peninsula is populated by peoples of various ancestral background. By studying mitochondrial DNA, it was observed that the Basque regions were populated by a Homogenous "genetic microdifferentiation" whereas most other parts of the region have a more Heterogeneous genetic variation. This indicates that the Basque Country was isolated resulting in "limited gene-flow interchange" with the surrounding regions. The other regions were shown to have a large amount of genetic diversity. Although these populations shared similar ancestry, the Basques were glacially isolated during the end of last Ice Age. The two populations diverged as access to other genetic sources were accessible to one population and not the other. The Northern Iberian Niches have been dissolving since the geographic constraints have been lifted since the end of the last ice age. This example of microdifferentiation through spatial partitioning can be seen through the variations of genetic ancestry throughout the human race.

=== Animals ===
A population of Drosophila melanogaster (common fruit fly or vinegar fly) found inside a wine cellar has a greater alcohol tolerance than a population found outside the wine cellar. This shows micro-differentiation, as each population of this species has adapted to its ecological niche.

An extensively studied example of niche microdifferentiation is the melanism of peppered moths near industrial centers of England during and after the Industrial Revolution. A drastic increase in the use of coal led to severe pollution which caused discoloration of buildings and trees and the reduced prevalence of lichen. Peppered moths are typically mottled in color, but during this time, a subspecies of the peppered moth, Biston betularia f. carbonaria, which is dark gray or black, became more prevalent near industrial cities. Research has shown that due to decreased visibility in their respective habitats, the typical mottled moths have an adaptive advantage in “clean,” rural areas where lichen is more prevalent, while carbonaria varieties have an advantage in polluted areas where coal smoke has blackened buildings and reduced lichen populations. This decreased visibility to predators protects the moths and gives them an evolutionary advantage. See also peppered moth evolution.

Guppies living in northeastern South America face a variety of evolutionary pressures based on the number of predators in their individual habitat. Researchers found that near the headwaters of most streams, the guppies had few natural enemies, but that near the end of the streams, they faced much greater predatory pressure. Consequently, guppies near the headwaters developed brighter colors in order to attract attention from potential mates, while guppies farther downstream, though still carrying some bright markings, tended strongly towards duller coloration for the purpose of camouflage.

=== Plants ===
Within a species the development of niches may occur through ecotype differentiation. This is especially common in the plant kingdom in which a single species may be distributed over a vast area.

Two rice (Oryza sativa) ecotypes are adapted to very different water regimes of the upland and lowland ecosystems in China. The upland ecotype has a strong root system and excellent drought tolerance, whereas the lowland ecotype grows well under normal irrigated conditions, but is highly sensitive to drought.

Niche microdifferentiation can also be seen in the adaptation of weeds. There is evidence of several species of weeds, including St. John's wort, creeping thistle, Bermuda grass, medusahead, and annual bluegrass developing localized ecotypes based on the conditions of the neighboring environment.

In cumin, niche microdifferentiation is important to knowing which ecotype will survive. An experiment was led to find out how best to grow cumin in Iran (where cumin is a very important medicinal plant). It showed that the ecotype of cumin which had originated in colder regions with less rainfall did better than other ecotypes of cumin. In this case, the ecotypes were differentiated by weather conditions in their respective environments and the ecotypes of cumin that did better had evolved to withstand harsher conditions than the cumin of other ecotypes. While still the same species, the ecotypes of cumin that did better were genetically tougher than others because of the environment they adapted to.

== Environmental factors regulating microdifferentiation ==
Factors effecting intraspecific variation can be linked to environmental pressures such as climate, terrain, resources, and predatory pressures. These factors are examples of morphological (sharing resources), spatial (territory, region, etc.), and, temporal (time of day, year, etc.)
