= S. sylvestre =

S. sylvestre may refer to:

- Secale sylvestre, Host., a rye species in the genus Secale
- Syzygium sylvestre, a plant species endemic to Sri Lanka

== See also ==
- Sylvestre (disambiguation)
