= Festucopsis =

Scientific classification
- Kingdom: Plantae
- Clade: Tracheophytes
- Clade: Angiosperms
- Clade: Monocots
- Clade: Commelinids
- Order: Poales
- Family: Poaceae
- Subfamily: Pooideae
- Supertribe: Triticodae
- Tribe: Triticeae
- Genus: Festucopsis (C.E.Hubb.) Melderis
- Species: F. serpentini

Binomial name
- Festucopsis serpentini (C.E.Hubb.) Melderis

Subspecies
- Festucopsis serpentini subsp. lurensis F.K.Mey.; Festucopsis serpentini subsp. serpentini

Synonyms
- Brachypodium serpentini C.E.Hubb.

Genus of grasses

Festucopsis is a genus of European plants in the grass family. It includes a single species, Festucopsis serpentini, a perennial endemic to Albania.

Two subspecies are accepted.

- Festucopsis serpentini subsp. lurensis F.K.Mey.
- Festucopsis serpentini subsp. serpentini

Species formerly included

- Elymus festucoides (Maire) Ibn Tattou (as Festucopsis festucoides (Maire) Löve)
- Peridictyon sanctum (Janka) Seberg, Fred. & Baden (as Festucopsis sancta (Janka) Melderis)

== See also ==
- List of Poaceae genera
