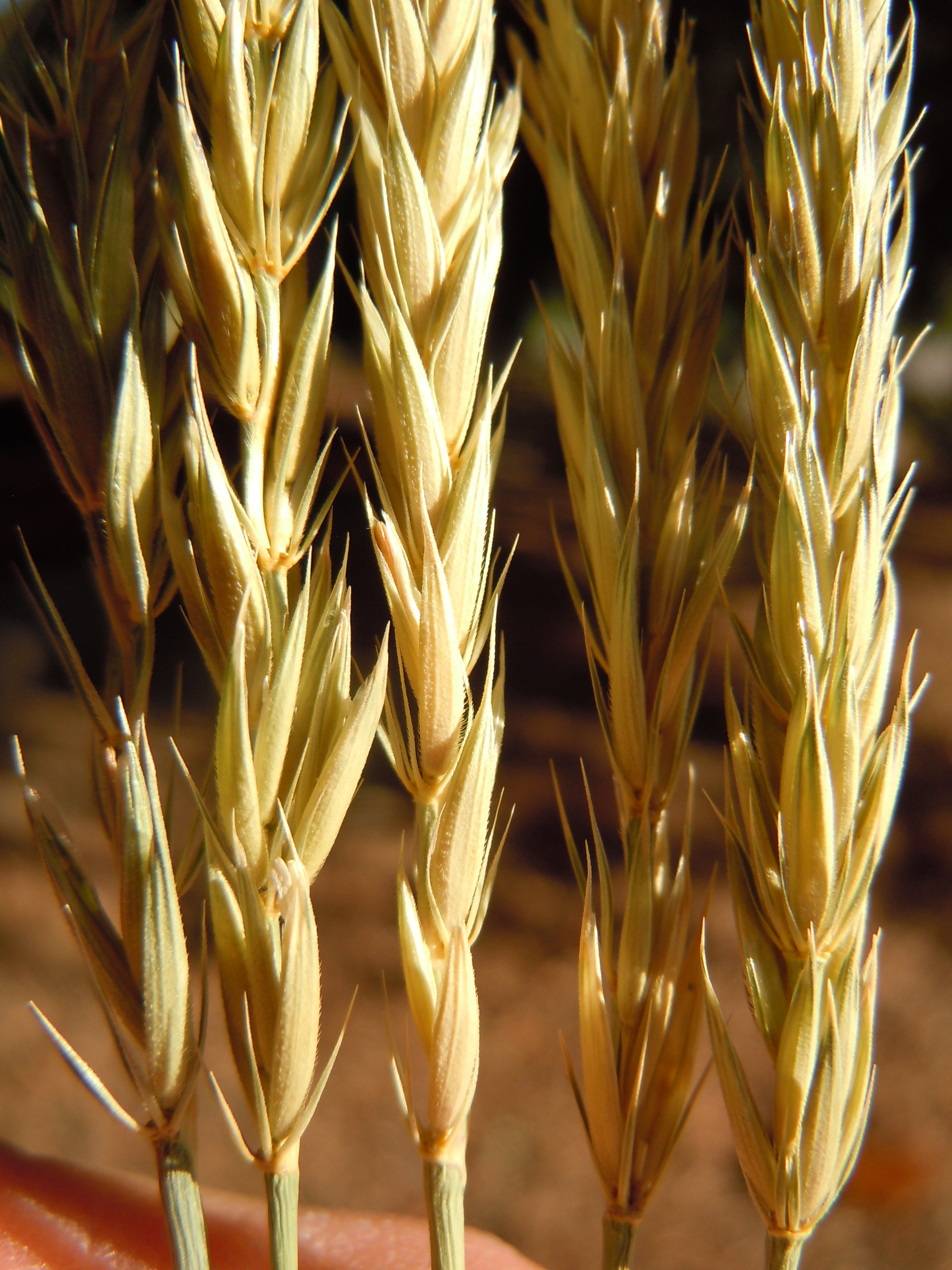

Scientific classification
- Kingdom: Plantae
- Clade: Tracheophytes
- Clade: Angiosperms
- Clade: Monocots
- Clade: Commelinids
- Order: Poales
- Family: Poaceae
- Subfamily: Pooideae
- Genus: Psathyrostachys
- Species: P. juncea

Binomial name
- Psathyrostachys juncea (Fisch.) Nevski

Synonyms
- Elymus junceus Fisch.

= Psathyrostachys juncea =

Species of grass

Psathyrostachys juncea is a species of grass known by the common name Russian wildrye. It was formerly classified as Elymus junceus. It is native to Russia and China, and has been introduced to other parts of the world, such as Canada and the United States. Psathyrostachys juncea is a great source of food for grazing animals, as it has high nutrition value in its dense basal leaves, even in the late summer and autumn seasons. This species can grow and prosper in many harsh environments, making it an ideal candidate for improvement as it can grow in areas were farming is difficult. This species is a drought-resistant forage plant and can survive during the cool seasons. It is also a cross-pollinator and is self-sterile. This means that P. juncea cannot self-fertilize; it must find another plant of the same species with which to exchange gametes. Self-sterilization increases the genetic diversity of a species.

== Description ==
Psathyrostachys juncea is a perennial bunch grass that grows in tufts that may be up to 1 metre (3.3 ft) tall or taller. The grass is long-lived and known to persist in cultivation for 25 years or more.

The grass has a dense root network beneath each clump; there are no rhizomes or stolons. The roots can reach 3 metres (9.8 ft) deep into the soil.

The leaves are located around the stem bases, and are straight or curled. Old leaf sheaths become shreddy. The inflorescence is a spike up to 11 to 16 centimetres (4.3 to 6.3 in) long.

=== Cultivars ===
Many cultivars of Psathyrostachys juncea have been developed, including 'Vinall', 'Bozoisky-Select', and 'Bozoisky II'.

=== Seedling vigor ===
Though Psathyrostachys juncea can survive in harsh conditions, it is a hard species to initially plant, because the seeds must be in the correct conditions in order to begin germination. Psathyrostachys juncea has low seedling vigor, which affects the success of germination. But once P. juncea has begun germination, it can tolerate most harsh weather conditions. In recent years, scientists have explored possible solutions to improving seedling vigor. One possible technique to increasing seedling vigor is increasing ploidy. In nature, P. juncea are diploids, however, tetraploid germplasm have been shown to increase seed size and seedling vigor in P. juncea. Regeneration of this species has been successful, meaning that scientists can more easily select for specific traits and manipulate P. juncea at the cellular level. Thus, humans can easily induce tetraploidy in P. juncea. As a result, breeding programs have begun to grow tetraploid cultivars so as to increase the success of P. juncea germination. There is a small change in tissue quality and nutrition content with different ploidy levels, but nothing significant. Therefore, increasing tetraploid cultivars is a possible avenue for improving seed quality. Path analysis has been conducted to examine what exactly effects seed yield. Fertile, strong stems (tillers), the number of flowers (florets) per flower cluster (spikelet), and seed weight all showed positive relationships with seed yield. That is, P. juncea with more stems/tillers, more flowers, and/or heavier seeds have improved seed yield. However, the number of flower clusters (spikelet) per stem and number of seeds per flower cluster were negatively correlated with seed yield. Thus, having more flowers on a cluster, not more seeds per cluster, increasing seed yield. This information can be used to improve breeding programs for P. juncea. In addition, water stress also improves leaf and inflorescence tissue quality, while nitrogen rich fertilizer improves leaf, stem, and inflorescence tissue quality. Increased tissue quality is related to improvements in total yield.

== Uses ==
Psathyrostachys juncea was introduced to North America as a forage grass and for rangeland rehabilitation and soil stabilization. The grass is "one of the most versatile forage grasses available for dryland pastures." It is palatable to livestock, though it does not make a good hay due to its basal leaves. It is also palatable for wild ungulates, such as elk. The grass is a particularly good forage when planted in alternating rows with a legume, such as alfalfa.

It is not generally invasive and usually does not become a noxious weed. It rarely grows outside of plots where it has been planted. The Southwestern United States has some invasive occurrences, such as on the Grand Canyon plateaus.

It is drought-resistant, flood-resistant most of the year, and is tolerant of cold. It is also tolerant of high soil salinity.

It is not easy to establish via seed; if the seeds are planted more than 1.9 centimeters deep the seedlings do not emerge in large numbers. The seedlings are weak. Once it has established, however, it is tough and competes well for water and nutrients. It is tolerant of fire because the dense clumpiness of the stems protects the axillary buds, which can produce tillers and resprout after destruction by fire.

== Evolutionary relationships ==
There are four novel alleles coding for high molecular weight glutenin subunits (HMW-GS) in the genus Psathyrostachys. High molecular weight glutenin subunits provide protein to the endosperm in wheat relatives but also determine the level of wheat improvement possible in a plant species. These proteins are coded from the Gun-1 locus, and studying this locus has helped scientists trace the evolutionary ties between Triticeae species. This means that P. juncea has close evolutionary ties to wild wheat relatives. Wheat improvement is therefore a major possibility for P. juncea. By improving wheat quality, P. juncea could potentially become a crop for human consumption, especially in areas were growing crops is challenging such as in dry or drought areas. The current obstacle to wheat improvement is that cross-pollinating wheat and P. juncea is extremely difficult because their gametes are not compatible with each other.
