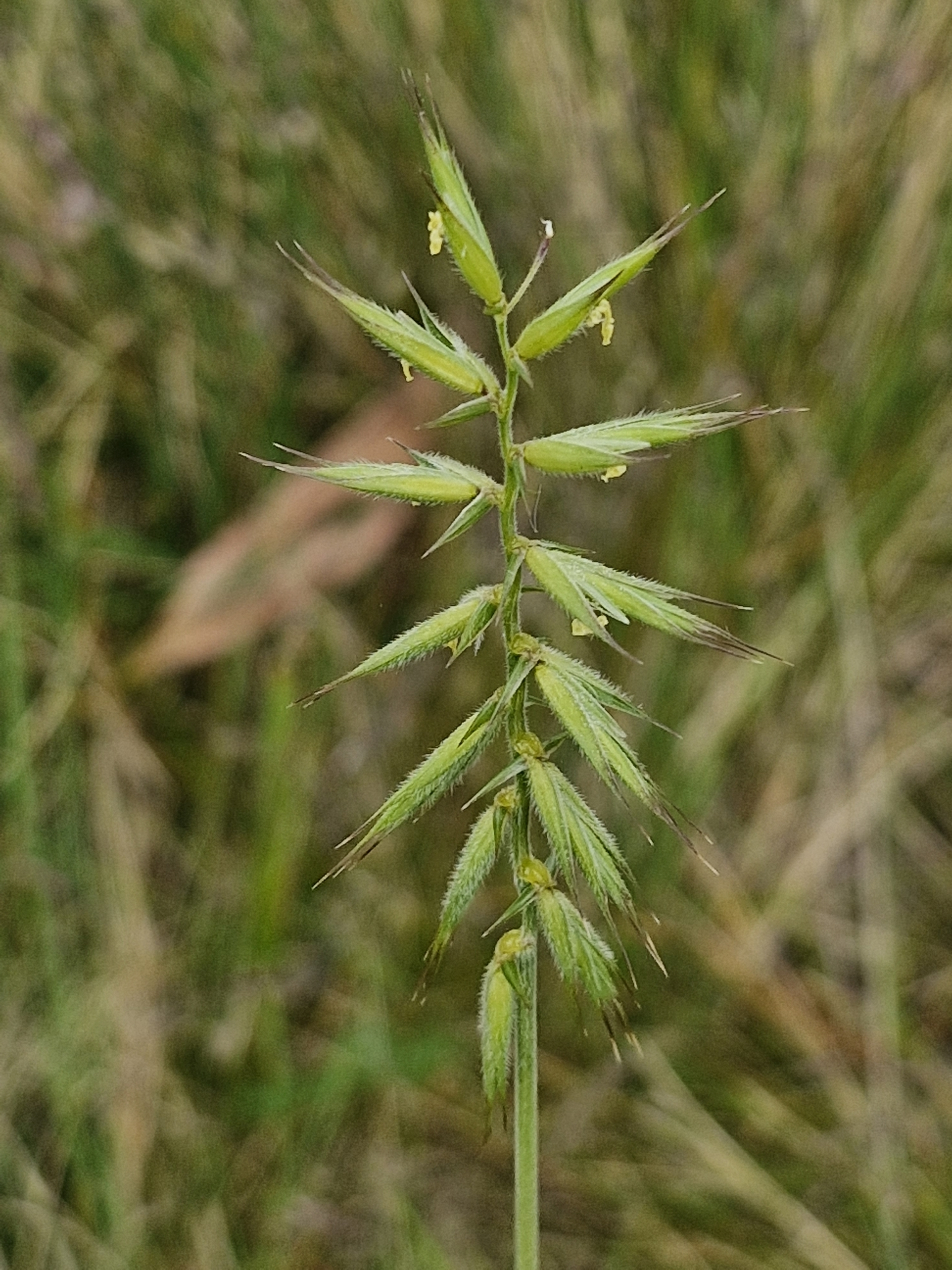
- Australopyrum pectinatum

Scientific classification
- Kingdom: Plantae
- Clade: Tracheophytes
- Clade: Angiosperms
- Clade: Monocots
- Clade: Commelinids
- Order: Poales
- Family: Poaceae
- Subfamily: Pooideae
- Supertribe: Triticodae
- Tribe: Triticeae
- Genus: Australopyrum (Tzvelev) Á.Löve

Synonyms
- Agropyron section Australopyrum Tzvelev

= Australopyrum =

Genus of grasses

Australopyrum is a genus of plants in the grass family, native to Australia, New Zealand, and New Guinea.

The genus Australopyrum is closely related to Agropyron, and some authors consider it part of that genus.

Species

- Australopyrum calcis Connor & Edgar - New Zealand South Island
- Australopyrum pectinatum (Labill.) Á.Löve - Queensland, New South Wales, Tasmania; naturalised in New Zealand
- Australopyrum retrofractum (Vickery) Á.Löve - New South Wales, Tasmania; naturalised in New Zealand North Island
- Australopyrum uncinatum Veldkamp - New Guinea
- Australopyrum velutinum (Nees) B.K.Simon - New South Wales, Tasmania, Victoria

formerly included

see Stenostachys

- Australopyrum enysii - Stenostachys enysii
