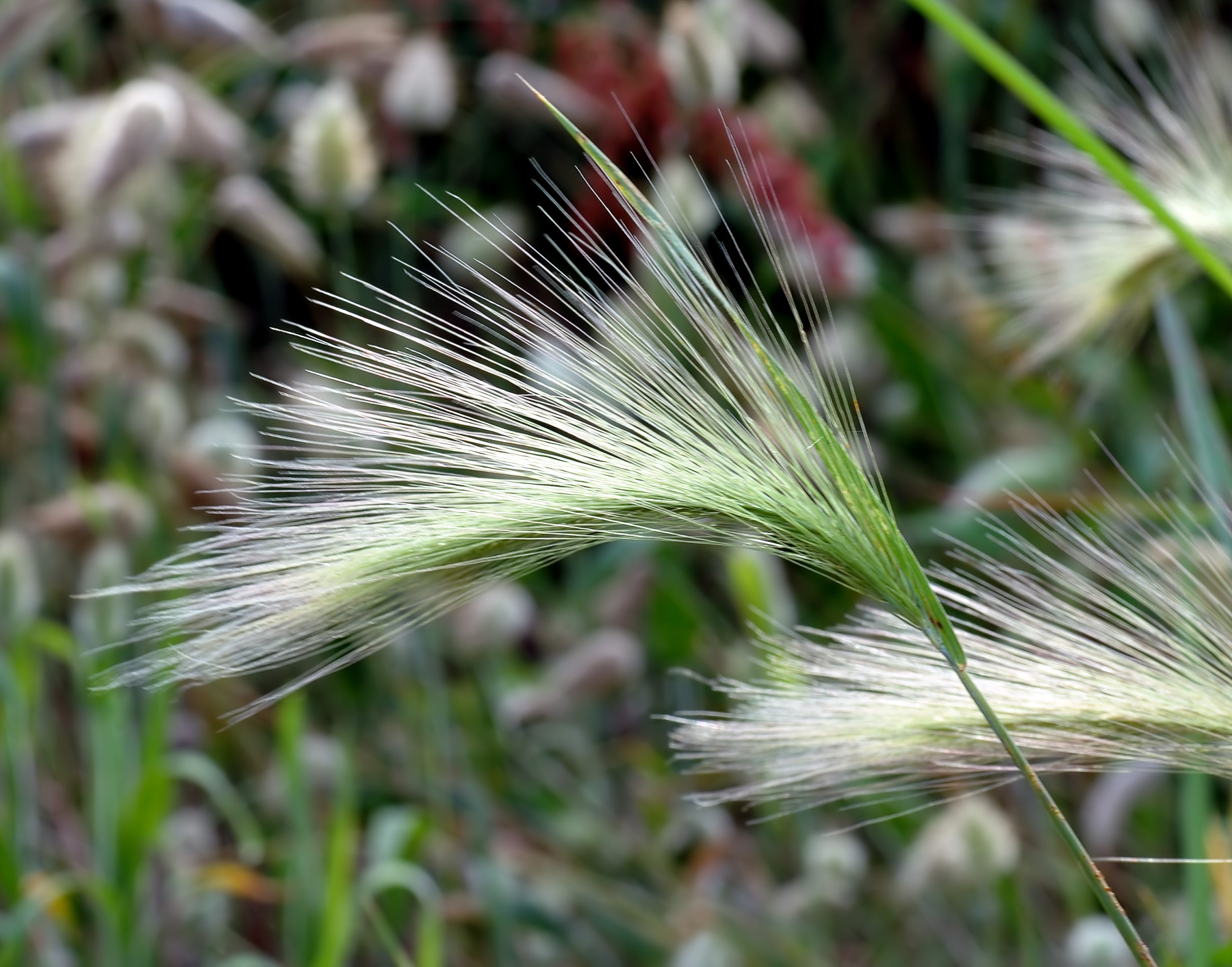

Scientific classification
- Kingdom: Plantae
- Clade: Tracheophytes
- Clade: Angiosperms
- Clade: Monocots
- Clade: Commelinids
- Order: Poales
- Family: Poaceae
- Clade: BOP clade
- Subfamily: Pooideae
- Supertribe: Triticodae
- Tribe: Triticeae; L.

Genera
- See text.

= Triticeae =

Tribe of grasses

Triticeae is a botanical tribe within the subfamily Pooideae of grasses that includes genera with many domesticated species. Major crop genera found in this tribe include wheat (see wheat taxonomy), barley, and rye; crops in other genera include some for human consumption, and others used for animal feed or rangeland protection. Among the world's cultivated species, this tribe has some of the most complex genetic histories. An example is bread wheat, which contains the genomes of three species with only one being a wheat Triticum species. Seed storage proteins in the Triticeae are implicated in various food allergies and intolerances.

== Genera ==
Genera recognized in Triticeae according to Robert Soreng et al.:

- Aegilops
- Agropyron
- Amblyopyrum
- Anthosachne
- Australopyrum
- Connorochloa
- Crithopsis
- Dasypyrum
- Douglasdeweya
- Elymus (syn. Campeiostachys, Elytrigia, Hystrix, Roegneria, Sitanion)
- Eremopyrum
- Festucopsis
- Henrardia
- Heteranthelium
- Hordelymus
- Hordeum (syn. Critesion)
- Kengyilia
- Leymus (syn. Aneurolepidium, Eremium, Macrohystrix, Microhystrix)
- Pascopyrum
- Peridictyon
- Psathyrostachys
- Pseudoroegneria
- Secale
- Stenostachys
- Taeniatherum
- Thinopyrum
- Triticum

== Cultivated or edible species ==
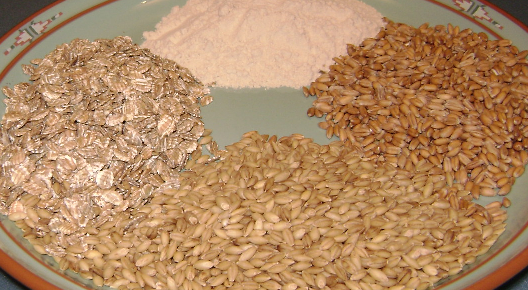
4 different commercial forms of Triticeae cultivars. Clockwise from top: common wheat flour, European spelt, barley corns, rolled rye

=== Aegilops ===
- Various species (rarely identifiable to species in archaeological material) occur in pre-agrarian archaeobotanical remains from Near Eastern sites. Their edible grains were doubtless harvested as wild food resources.
- Ae. speltoides – ancient food grain, putative source of the B genome in bread wheat and the G genome in T. timopheevii
- Ae. tauschii – Source of D genome in wheat

=== Amblyopyrum ===
- Amblyopyrum muticum – Source of the T genome.

=== Elymus ===
Various species are cultivated for pastoral purposes or to protect fallow land from opportunistic or invasive species

- E. canadensis – edible, bread-flour capable, fiddly seeds
- E. trachycaulus – pastoral cultivar

=== Hordeum ===
Many barley cultivars

- H. vulgare – common barley (6 subspecies, ~100 cultivars)
- H. bulbosum – edible seeds
- H. murinum (mouse barley) – cooked as piñole, bread-flour capable, medicinal: diuretic.

=== Leymus ===
- L. arenarius (Lyme grass) – bread-flour capable, possible food additive
- L. racemosus (Volga wild rye) – drought tolerant cereal, used in Russia
- L. condensatus (giant wild rye) – Edible seeds, harvesting problematic small seeds
- L. triticoides – used in North America, seed hairs must be singed

=== Secale ===
Ryes

- S. cereale (cereal rye) – Livestock feed and sour dough bread – 6 subspecies.
- S. strictum - actively cultivated
- S. sylvestre - (Tibetan rye) - actively cultivated in Tibet and China highlands.
- S. sylvestre (Armenian wild rye) – edible seeds, thickener.

=== Triticum ===
Wheat

- T. aestivum (bread wheat) – (AABBDD Genome)
  - T. compactum (club wheat)
  - T. macha (hulled)
  - T. spelta (hulled, spelt)
  - T. sphaerococcum (shot wheat)
- T. monococcum (Einkorn wheat) (A Genome)
- T. timopheevii (Sanduri wheat)
- T. turgidum (poulard wheat) (AABB Genome)
  - T. carthlicum (Persian black wheat)
  - T. dicoccoides (wild emmer wheat)
  - T. dicoccum (cultivated emmer wheat) - used to make Farro
  - T. durum (durum wheat)
  - T. paleocolchicum
  - T. polonicum (Polish wheat)
  - T. turanicum (Khorasan wheat)

== Genetics ==
Genomes of some Triticeae genera and species
Genera & Species	1st	2nd	3rd
Triticum boeoticum	AA
Triticum monococcum	A_{M}A_{M}
Triticum urartu	A_{U}A_{U}
Aegilops speltoides var. speltoides	BB
Aegilops caudata	CC
Aegilops tauschii	DD
Lophopyrum elongatum	EE
Hordeum vulgare	HH
Thinopyrum bessarabicum	JJ
Aegilops comosa	MM
Aegilops uniaristata	NN
Henrardia persica	OO
Agropyrum cristatum	PP
Secale cereale	RR
Aegilops bicornis	SS
Amblyopyrum muticum	TT
Aegilops umbellulata	UU
Dasypyrum	VV
Psathyrostachys	NsNs
Pseudoroegneria	StSt
Triticum zhukovskyi	AA	A_{M}A_{M}	GG
Triticum turgidum	AA	BB
Triticum aestivum	AA	BB	DD
Triticum timopheevii	AA	GG
Aegilops cylindrica	CC	DD
Stenostachys sp.	HH	WW
Elmyus canadensis	HH	StSt
Elmyus abolinii	YY	StSt
Thinopyrum Vjd =(V/J/D)	JJ	StSt	VjdVjd
Leymus tricoides	NsNs	XmXm

Triticeae and its sister tribe Bromeae (bromes or cheat grasses) when joined form a sister clade with Poeae and Aveneae (oats). Inter-generic gene flow characterized these taxa from the early stages. For example, Poeae and Aveneae share a mtDNA genetic marker with barley and 10 other members of Triticeae, whereas all 19 genera of Triticeae bear a wheat marker along with Bromeae.

Genera within Triticeae contain diploid, allotetraploid and/or allohexaploid genomes, the capacity to form allopolyploid genomes varies within the tribe. In this tribe, the majority of diploid species tested are closely related to Aegilops, the more distal members (earliest branch points) include Hordeum (Barley), Eremian, Psathyrostachys. The broad distribution of cultivars within the Tribe and the properties of the proteins have implication in the treatment of certain digestive diseases and autoimmune disorders.

== Evolution of the tribe ==
One of the earliest branches in Triticeae, to Pseudoroegeneria, produces the genome StSt and another Hordeum then genome = HH. Allotetraploid combinations of Pseudoroegeneria and Hordeum and are seen in Elmyus (HHStSt), but also shows introgression from Australian and Agropyron wheatgrasses. Elymus contains mostly Pseudoroegeneria mtDNA.

Many genera and species of Triticeae are allopolyploids, having more chromosomes than seen in typical diploids. Typical allopolyploids are tetraploid or hexaploid, XXYY or XXYYZZ. The creation of polyploid species results from natural random events tolerated by polyploid-capable plants. Natural allopolyploid plants may have selective advantages and some may permit the recombination of distantly related genetic material. Poulard wheat is an example of a stable allotetraploid wheat.

The Secale (domesticated rye) may be a very early branch from the goat grass clad (or goat grasses are a branch of early rye grasses), as branch these are almost contemporary with the branching between monoploid wheat and Aegilops tauschii. Studies in Anatolia now suggest Rye (Secale) was cultivated, but not domesticated, prior to the holocene and to evidence for the cultivation of wheat. As climate changed the favorability of Secale declined. At that time other strains of barley and wheat may have been cultivated, but humans did little to change them.

== Goat grasses and the evolution of bread wheat ==

=== Tetraploidization in wild emmer wheat ===
Aegilops appears to be basal to several taxa such as Triticum, Amblyopyrum, and Crithopsis. Certain species such as Aegilops speltoides could potentially represent core variants of the taxa. The generic placement may be more a matter of nomenclature. Genera Aegilops and Triticum are very closely related; as the adjacent image illustrates, the Aegilops species occupy most of the basal branch points in bread wheat evolution indicating that genus Triticum evolved from Aegilops after an estimated 4 million years ago. The divergence of the genomes is followed by allotetraploidization of a speltoid goatgrass x basal wheat species Triticum boeoticum with strains in the middle eastern region giving rise to cultivated emmer wheat.

=== Hexaploidization of tetraploid wheat ===
Hybridization of tetraploid wheat with Ae. tauschii produced a hulled wheat similar to spelt, suggesting T. spelta is basal. The tauschii species can be subdivided into subspecies tauschii (eastern Turkey to China or Pakistan) and strangulata (Caucasus to S. Caspian, N. Iran). The D genome of bread wheat is closer to A.t. strangulata than A.t. tauschii. It is suggested that Ae. tauschii underwent rapid selective evolution prior to combining with tetraploid wheat.

== Wild Triticeae use by humans ==
Intense use of wild Triticeae can be seen in the Levant as early as 23,000 years ago. This site, Ohala II (Israel), also shows that Triticeae grains were processed and cooked. Many cultivars appear to have been domesticated in the region of the upper Fertile Crescent, Levant and central Anatolia. More recent evidence suggests that cultivation of wheat from emmer's wheat required a longer period with wild seeding maintaining a presence in archaeological finds.

== Pastoral grasses ==
Triticeae has a pastoral component that some contend goes back to the Neolithic period and is referred to as the Garden Hunting Hypothesis. In this hypothesis grains could be planted or shared for the purpose of attracting game animals so that they could be hunted close to settlements.

Today, rye and other Triticeae cultivars are used to graze animals, particularly cattle. Rye grasses in the New World have been used selectively as fodder, but also to protect grasslands without the introduction of invasive Old World species.

== Triticeae and health ==
Glutens (storage proteins) in the Triticeae tribe have been linked to gluten-sensitive diseases. While it was once believed that oats carried similar potentials, recent studies indicate that most oat sensitivity is the result of contamination. Triticeae glutens studies are important in determining the links between gluten and gastrointestinal, allergic, and autoimmune diseases. Some of the recently discovered biochemical and immunochemical properties of these proteins suggest they evolved for protection against dedicated or continuous consumption by mammalian seed-eaters. One recent publication even raises doubts about wheat's safety for anyone to eat. Overlapping properties with regard to food preparation have made these proteins much more useful as cereal cultivars, and a balanced perspective suggests a variable tolerance to Triticeae glutens reflects early childhood environment and genetic predisposition.
