= Hordeum brevisubulatum =

Scientific classification
- Kingdom: Plantae
- Clade: Embryophytes
- Clade: Tracheophytes
- Clade: Spermatophytes
- Clade: Angiosperms
- Clade: Monocots
- Clade: Commelinids
- Order: Poales
- Family: Poaceae
- Subfamily: Pooideae
- Tribe: Triticeae
- Genus: Hordeum
- Species: H. brevisubulatum

Binomial name
- Hordeum brevisubulatum (Trin.) Link

Synonyms
- List: Critesion brevisubulatum (Trin.) Á.Löve; Critesion brevisubulatum subsp. nevskianum (Bowden) Á.Löve; Critesion brevisubulatum subsp. turkestanicum (Nevski) Á.Löve; Critesion iranicum (Bothmer) Á.Löve; Critesion nevskianum (Bowden) Tzvelev; Critesion turkestanicum (Nevski) Tzvelev; Critesion violaceum (Boiss. & Hohen.) Á.Löve; Hordeum brevisubulatum var. hirtellum Z.S.Qin & S.D.Zhao; Hordeum brevisubulatum subsp. iranicum Bothmer; Hordeum brevisubulatum subsp. nevskianum (Bowden) Tzvelev; Hordeum brevisubulatum var. turkestanicum (Nevski) P.C.Kuo; Hordeum brevisubulatum subsp. turkestanicum (Nevski) Tzvelev; Hordeum brevisubulatum subsp. violaceum (Boiss. & Hohen.) Tzvelev; Hordeum iranicum (Bothmer) Tzvelev; Hordeum macilentum Steud.; Hordeum nevskianum Bowden; Hordeum turkestanicum Nevski; Hordeum violaceum Boiss. & Hohen.

Species of plant

Hordeum brevisubulatum is a widespread species of wild barley native to temperate and subarctic Eastern Europe and Asia. A halophyte, it prefers to grow in saline grasslands.
