= Pseudoroegneria =

Scientific classification
- Kingdom: Plantae
- Clade: Tracheophytes
- Clade: Angiosperms
- Clade: Monocots
- Clade: Commelinids
- Order: Poales
- Family: Poaceae
- Subfamily: Pooideae
- Supertribe: Triticodae
- Tribe: Triticeae
- Genus: Pseudoroegneria (Nevski) Á.Löve

Genus of grasses

Pseudoroegneria is a genus of grasses. It includes 16 species native to temperate and subarctic Eurasia, from Ukraine, Finland, and Greece to Pakistan, Siberia, and northern China, as well as northwestern Africa (Morocco and Algeria) and western North America (Alaska to northeastern Mexico).

== Species ==
16 species are accepted.

- Pseudoroegneria cognata (Hack.) Á.Löve
- Pseudoroegneria dshinalica (Sablina) Á.Löve
- Pseudoroegneria geniculata (Trin.) Á.Löve
- Pseudoroegneria gmelinii (Trin. ex Schrad.) Sennikov
- Pseudoroegneria gracillima (Nevski) Á.Löve
- Pseudoroegneria heidemaniae (Tzvelev) Á.Löve
- Pseudoroegneria kosaninii (Nábelek) Á.Löve
- Pseudoroegneria libanotica (Hack.) D.R.Dewey
- Pseudoroegneria marginata (H.Lindb.) V.Lucía, M.M.Mart.Ort., E.Rico & K.Anamth.-Jon.
- Pseudoroegneria setulifera (Nevski) Á.Löve
- Pseudoroegneria sosnowskyi (Hack.) Á.Löve
- Pseudoroegneria spicata (Pursh) Á.Löve
- Pseudoroegneria stewartii (Melderis) Á.Löve
- Pseudoroegneria stipifolia (Trautv.) Á.Löve
- Pseudoroegneria strigosa (Schult.) Á.Löve
- Pseudoroegneria tauri (Boiss. & Balansa) Á.Löve
