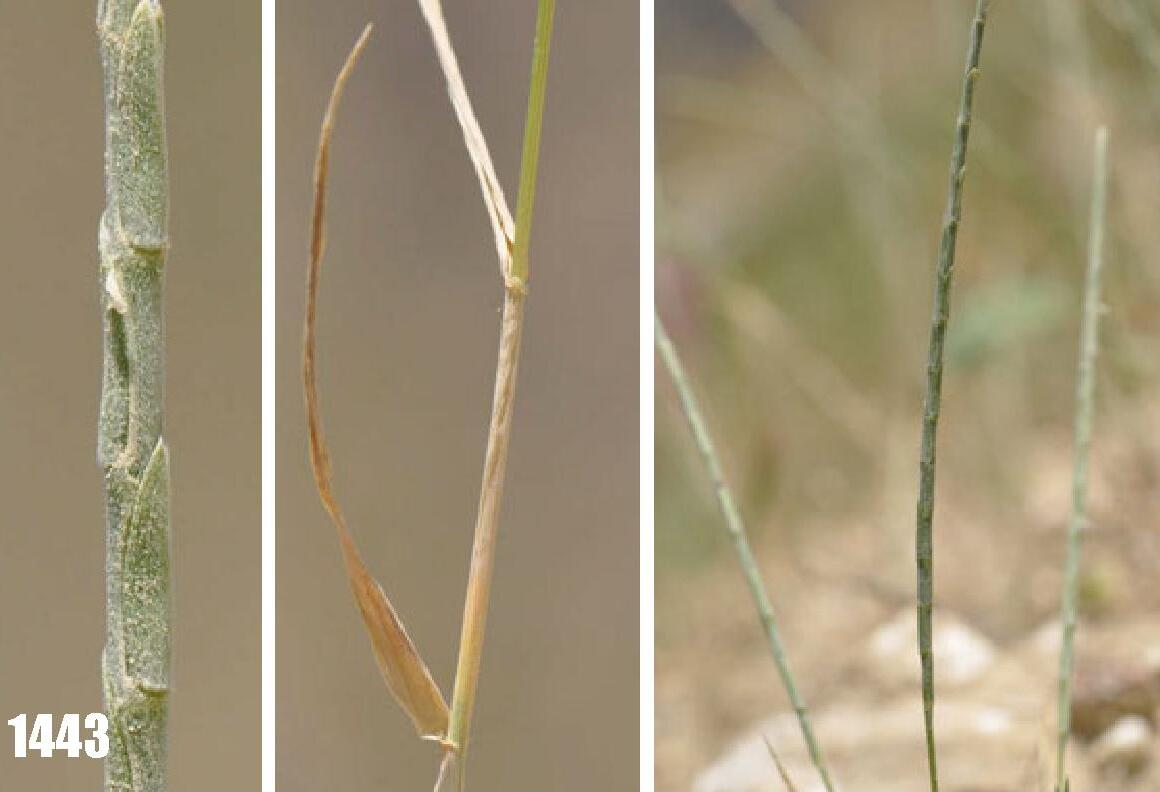
- Henrardia persica

Scientific classification
- Kingdom: Plantae
- Clade: Tracheophytes
- Clade: Angiosperms
- Clade: Monocots
- Clade: Commelinids
- Order: Poales
- Family: Poaceae
- Subfamily: Pooideae
- Supertribe: Triticodae
- Tribe: Triticeae
- Genus: Henrardia; C.E.Hubb.

Type species
- Henrardia persica (Boiss.) C.E.Hubb.

= Henrardia =

Genus of grasses

Henrardia is a genus of Asian plants in the grass family.

Species

- Henrardia persica (Boiss.) C.E.Hubb. - Kazakhstan, Kyrgyzstan, Turkmenistan, Uzbekistan, Tajikistan, Afghanistan, Iran, Turkey, Pakistan, Syria, Lebanon
- Henrardia pubescens C.E.Hubb. - Syria, Lebanon, Israel, Palestine, Jordan, Iraq, Iran
