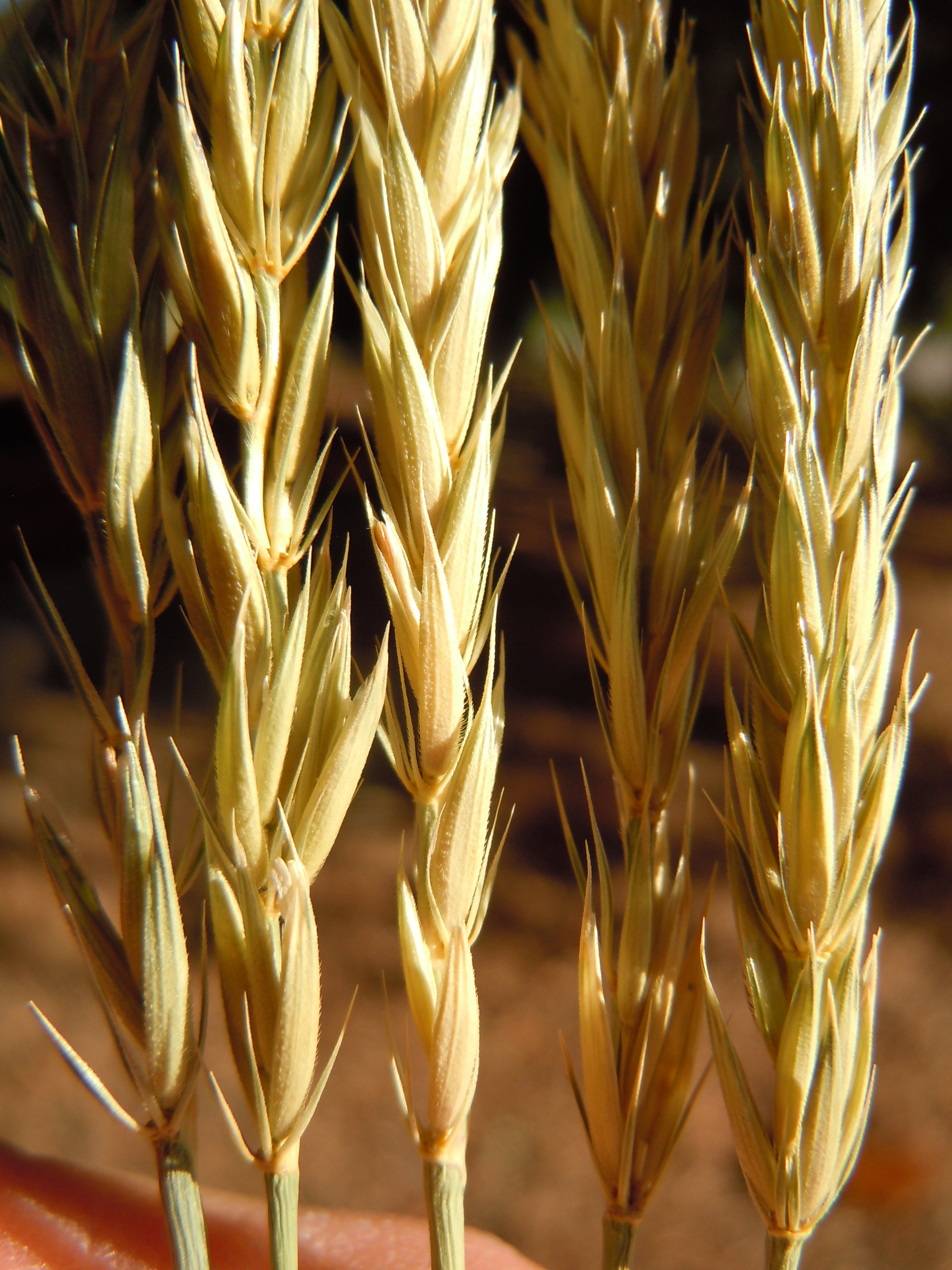
- Psathyrostachys juncea

Scientific classification
- Kingdom: Plantae
- Clade: Tracheophytes
- Clade: Angiosperms
- Clade: Monocots
- Clade: Commelinids
- Order: Poales
- Family: Poaceae
- Subfamily: Pooideae
- Supertribe: Triticodae
- Tribe: Triticeae
- Genus: Psathyrostachys; Nevski ex Roshev.

Type species
- Psathyrostachys lanuginosa (Trin.) Nevski

= Psathyrostachys =

Genus of grasses

Psathyrostachys is a genus of Eurasian plants in the grass family.

Species

- Psathyrostachys caduca
- Psathyrostachys daghestanica
- Psathyrostachys fragilis
- Psathyrostachys huashanica
- Psathyrostachys juncea
- Psathyrostachys kronenburgii
- Psathyrostachys lanuginosa
- Psathyrostachys rupestris
- Psathyrostachys scabriphylla
- Psathyrostachys stoloniformis
