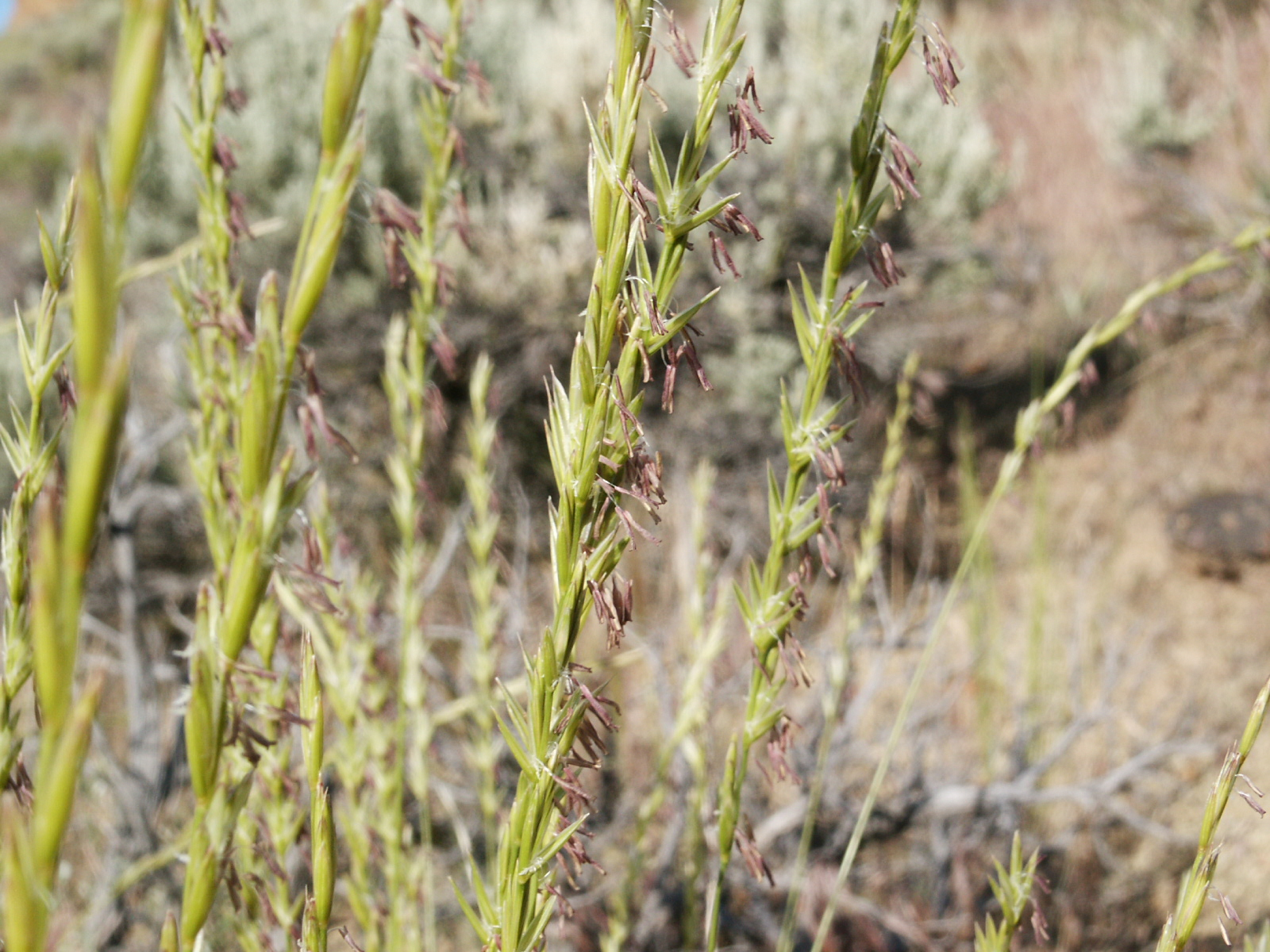

Scientific classification
- Kingdom: Plantae
- Clade: Tracheophytes
- Clade: Angiosperms
- Clade: Monocots
- Clade: Commelinids
- Order: Poales
- Family: Poaceae
- Subfamily: Pooideae
- Genus: Pseudoroegneria
- Species: P. spicata

Binomial name
- Pseudoroegneria spicata (Pursh) Á.Löve 1980

Synonyms
- List: Agropyron divergens (Steud.) P.Candargy; Agropyron divergens (Nees ex Steud.) Vasey; Agropyron inerme (Scribn. & J.G.Sm.) Rydb.; Agropyron spicatum (Pursh) Scribn. & J.G.Sm.; Agropyron vaseyi Scribn. & J.G.Sm.; Elymus spicatus (Pursh) Gould; Elytrigia spicata (Pursh) D.R.Dewey; Festuca spicata Pursh 1813; Roegneria spicata (Pursh) Beetle; Schedonorus spicatus (Pursh) Roem. & Schult.; Triticum aegilopoides Thurb. ex A.Gray 1863 not Forssk. 1775; Triticum divergens Steud.; Zeia spicata (Pursh) Lunell

= Pseudoroegneria spicata =

Bluebunch wheatgrass

Species of grass

Pseudoroegneria spicata is a species of perennial bunchgrass known by the common name bluebunch wheatgrass. It is native to western North America.

== Description ==
Bluebunch wheatgrass can grow up to 0.9 metres (3 feet) tall. It can often be distinguished from other bunchgrasses by the awns on its seedheads which stand out at an angle nearly 90 degrees from the stem. It is often bluish. The roots of the grass have a waxy layer that helps it resist desiccation in dry soils. In areas with more moisture the grass may produce rhizomes.

The relationship between the traits and climates of P. spicata is consistent with those of other grass species that also have a summer growing season. Populations of P. spicata from warm, arid environments are often smaller with earlier phenology, narrower leaves, and have greater leaf pubescence. This is in contrast to P. spicata plants from wetter and higher nutrient environments, which tend to be bigger, taller, and have larger leaves.

The stems and leaf sheaths of P. spicata dominate photosynthetic carbon uptake during the late spring and summer seasons. Additionally, bluebunch wheatgrass shows a greater investment of biomass and nutrients in the stems and sheaths, causing an increase in photosynthetic capacity per unit surface area.

Pseudoroegneria spicata is most commonly found as a diploid (2n = 14), although autotetraploid forms (4n = 28) have been found in eastern Washington and northern Idaho.

== Taxonomy ==
The species is also known by the scientific synonyms Elymus spicatus and Agropyron spicatum.

Two subspecies of bluebunch wheatgrass are recognized: P. spicata ssp. spicata and P. spicata ssp. inerme, commonly known as beardless bluebunch wheatgrass. The determining characteristic between the two is the presence of divergent awns, or hair-like projections that extend off a larger structure, such as the lemma or floret. These two subspecies have been known to hybridize.

== Distribution and habitat ==
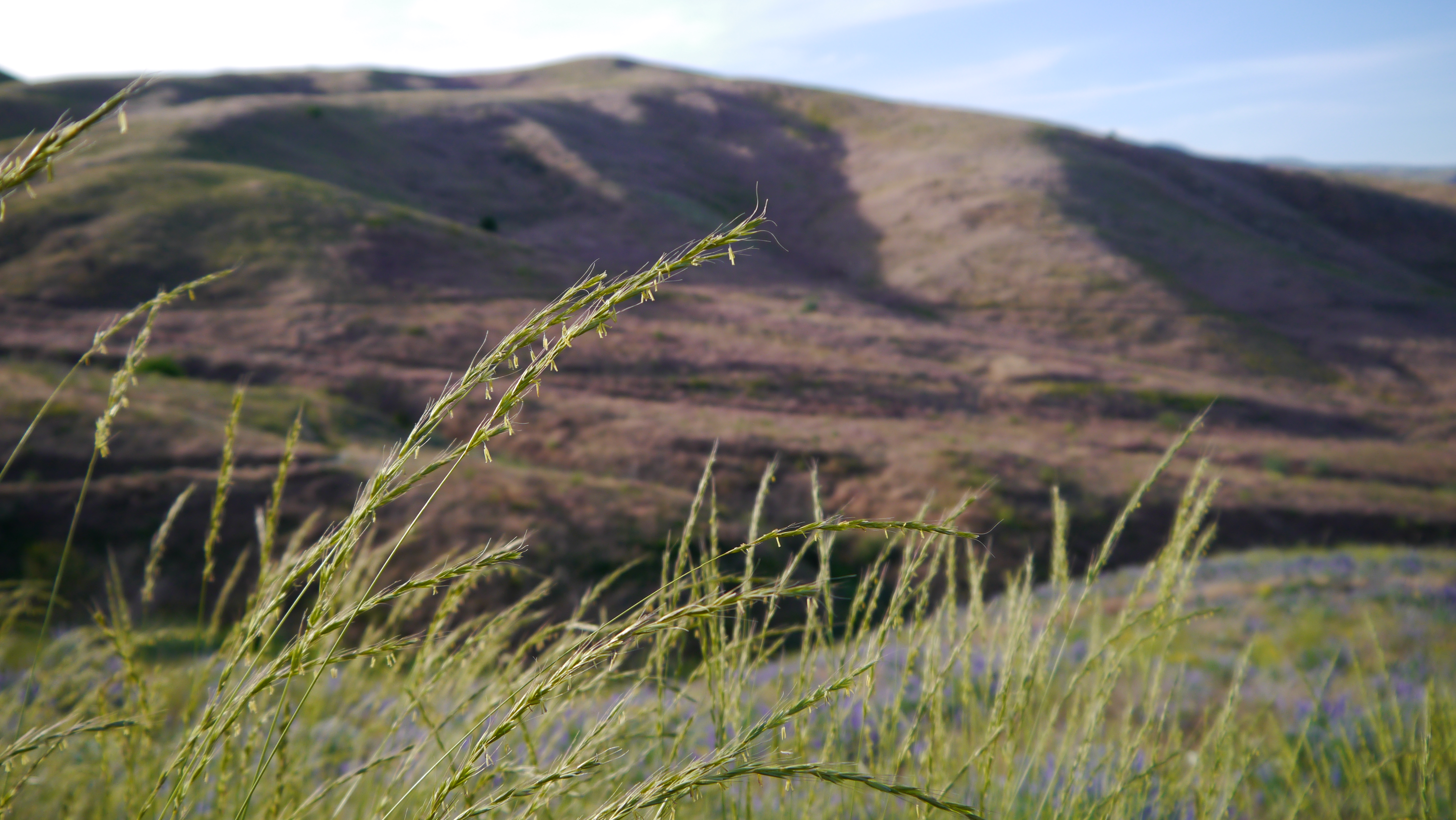
Pseudoroegneria spicata growing in Chelan County, Washington

Pseudoroegneria spicata can be found in the United States, Canada, and Mexico from Alaska and Yukon south as far as Sonora and Nuevo León.

It is the dominant species of grass among the mountainous regions of the western United States, occurring at elevations that range from 150–3,000 m (490–9,840 ft) and where precipitation is 250–500 millimetres (10–19 1/2 in). It occurs in many types of habitat, including sagebrush, forests, woodlands, and grasslands. This grass thrives in sandy and clay rich soils, but is also capable of growing on thin, rocky soils. It does not tolerate soils with high alkalinity, salt, or excessive moisture.

== Ecology ==
Pseudoregneria spicata has extensive drought-resistant root systems that can compete with and suppress the spread of exotic weeds. Its roots are also known to have significant responses when they come into contact with the roots of other plants. When plants of the same species that were grown in different sites were planted in pots together, the resulting biomass was 30% more than in pots with plants from the same population or site. Furthermore, the elongation of the roots decreased after contact with roots from another plant from the same population, this was compared to after contact with roots from a plant of a different population. Such behavior suggests that the roots of bluebunch wheatgrass are capable of detection and avoidance mechanisms when exposed to intraspecific plants from the same population.

The roots of this grass are also known to have notable physiological responses to enriched soil patches that are treated with varying solutions of nutrients, most notably nitrogen, potassium, and phosphorus. This exploitation of nutrient-rich soil can affect the nutrient status of the overall plant. In phosphorus enriched environments, the mean root uptake of phosphorus was 5–26% higher compared to roots from control soil patches. Results regarding the nutrient uptake capacities of P. spicata potassium enriched environments indicate no apparent difference between enriched and controlled soil. This is in contrast to the nitrogen enrichment experiment, where mean rates of ammonium uptake increased between 22–88% and mean rates of potassium root uptake were 17–71% higher in soil enriched with 50 μm of nitrogen, the lowest concentration tested in a particular study.

Pseudoregneria spicata is outcompeted by noxious weeds such as diffuse knapweed (Centaurea diffusa) and medusahead (Taeniatherum caput-medusae). It provides important forage for both livestock and native wildlife in western North America.

== Uses ==
The species is widely used for revegetation of degraded habitat in the region, and cultivars have been developed.

== In culture ==
It is the state grass of Montana, Oregon, and Washington.
