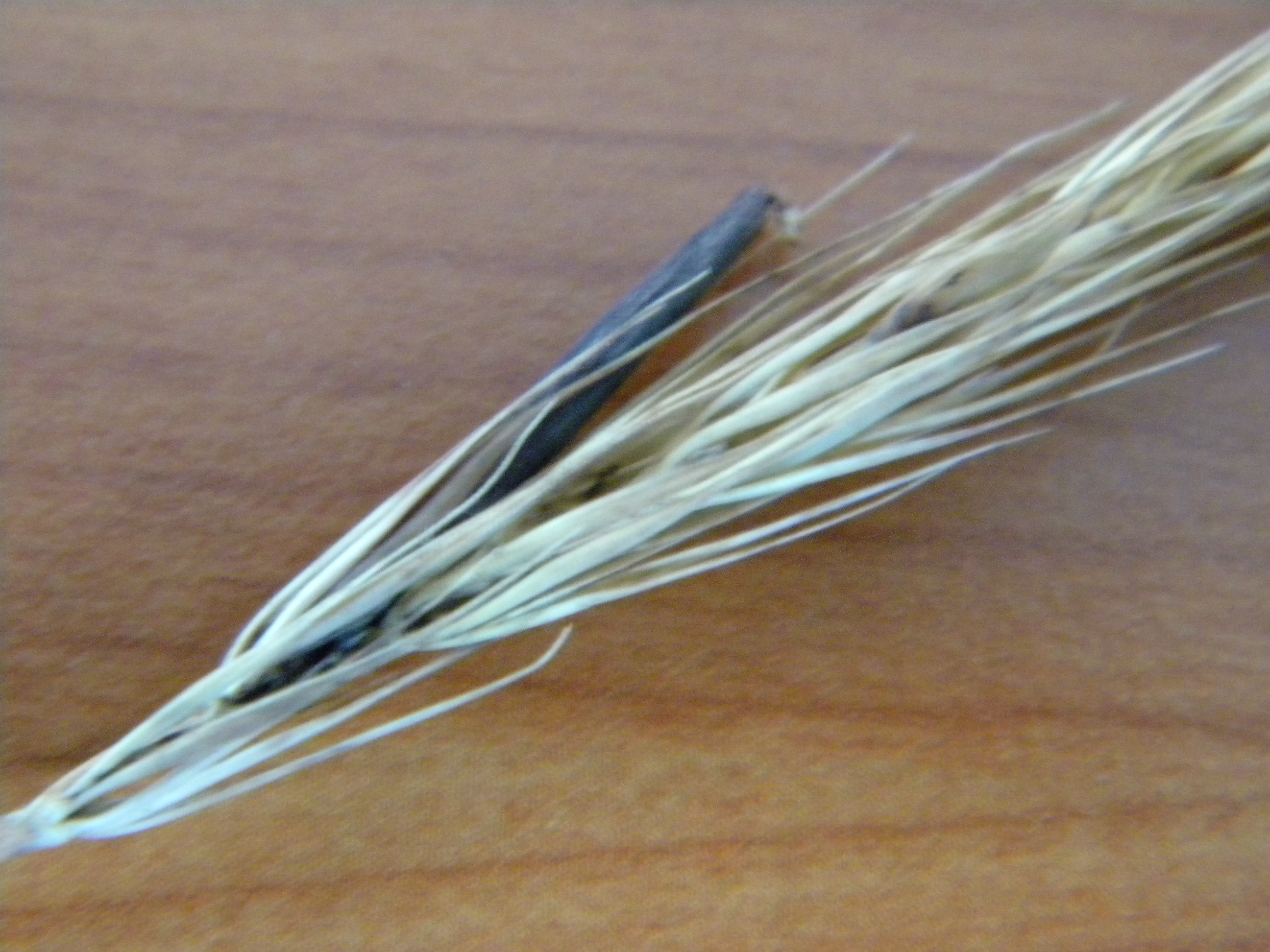
- Hordelymus europaeus infected with ergot (Claviceps purpurea)

Scientific classification
- Kingdom: Plantae
- Clade: Embryophytes
- Clade: Tracheophytes
- Clade: Angiosperms
- Clade: Monocots
- Clade: Commelinids
- Order: Poales
- Family: Poaceae
- Subfamily: Pooideae
- Supertribe: Triticodae
- Tribe: Triticeae
- Genus: Hordelymus; Jess. ex Harz 1885 not Bachtj & Darevsk 1950
- Species: H. europaeus

Binomial name
- Hordelymus europaeus (L.) Jess. ex Harz

Synonyms
- Cuviera Koeler 1802, rejected name not Cuviera DC. 1807 (Rubiaceae); Leptothrix (Dumort.) Dumort. 1868 not Kuetzing 1843; Medusather (Griseb.) P.Candargy; Elymus europaeus L.; Hordeum sylvaticum Huds.; Hordeum europaeum (L.) All.; Cuviera europaea (L.) Koeler; Leptothrix europaea (L.) Dumort.; Frumentum sylvaticum E.H.L.Krause; Hordeum cylindricum Murray; Hordeum montanum Schrank; Elymus cylindricus (Murray) Pohl; Hordeum elymoides Vest ex Kunth; Elymus compositus Steud.; Hordeum desmoulinsii Philippe

= Hordelymus =

Genus of grasses

Hordelymus is a genus of European, north African, and southwest Asian plants in the grass family.

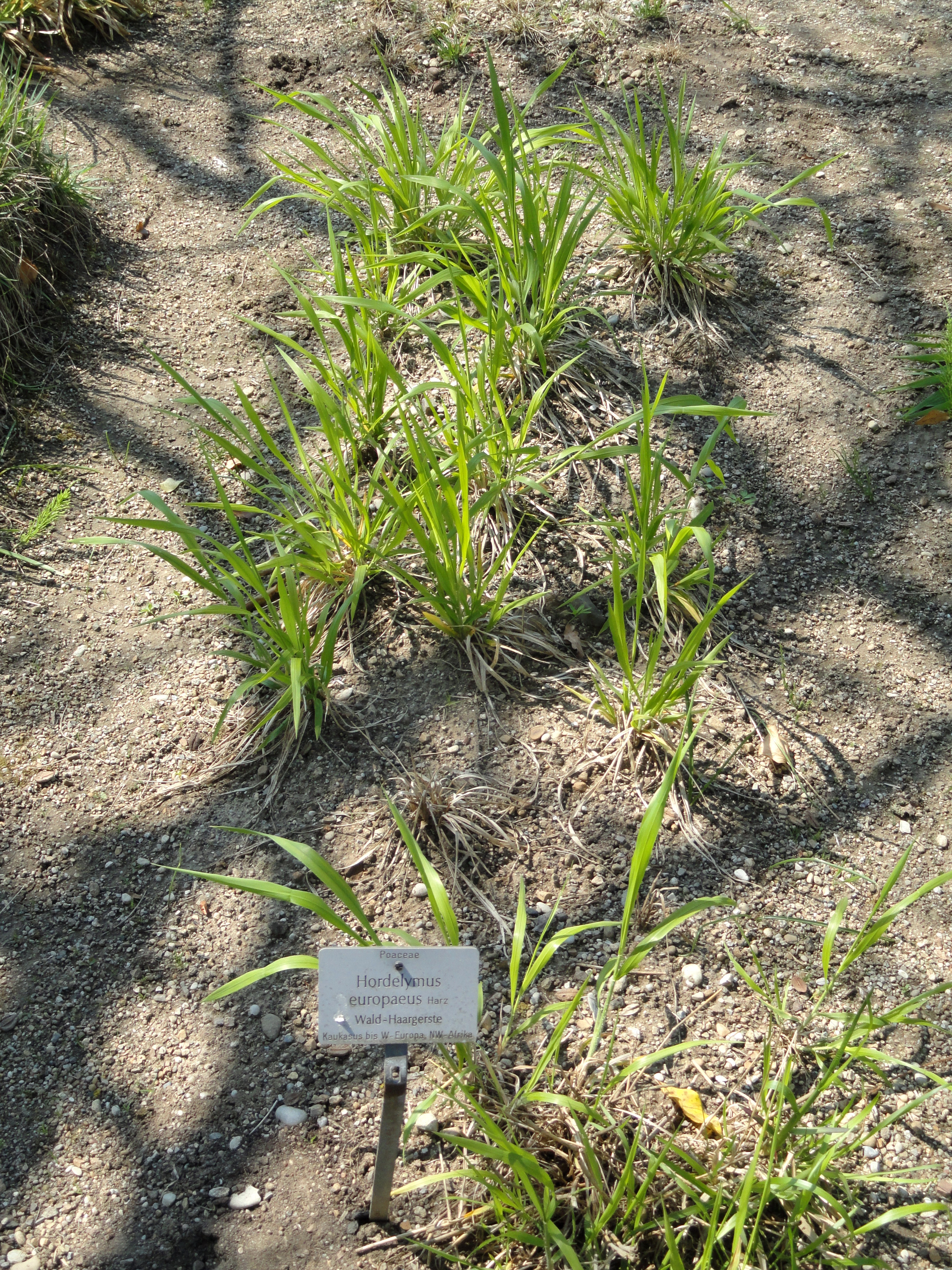
Hordelymus europaeus

The only known species is Hordelymus europaeus, native to Europe (from Sweden + Ireland to Spain, Italy, and Russia) as well as North Africa (Algeria + Morocco) and southwestern Asia (Turkey + Caucasus). Wood-barley is a common name for H. europaeus.

Formerly included (see Taeniatherum)

- Hordelymus asper - Taeniatherum caput-medusae
- Hordelymus caput-medusae - Taeniatherum caput-medusae
