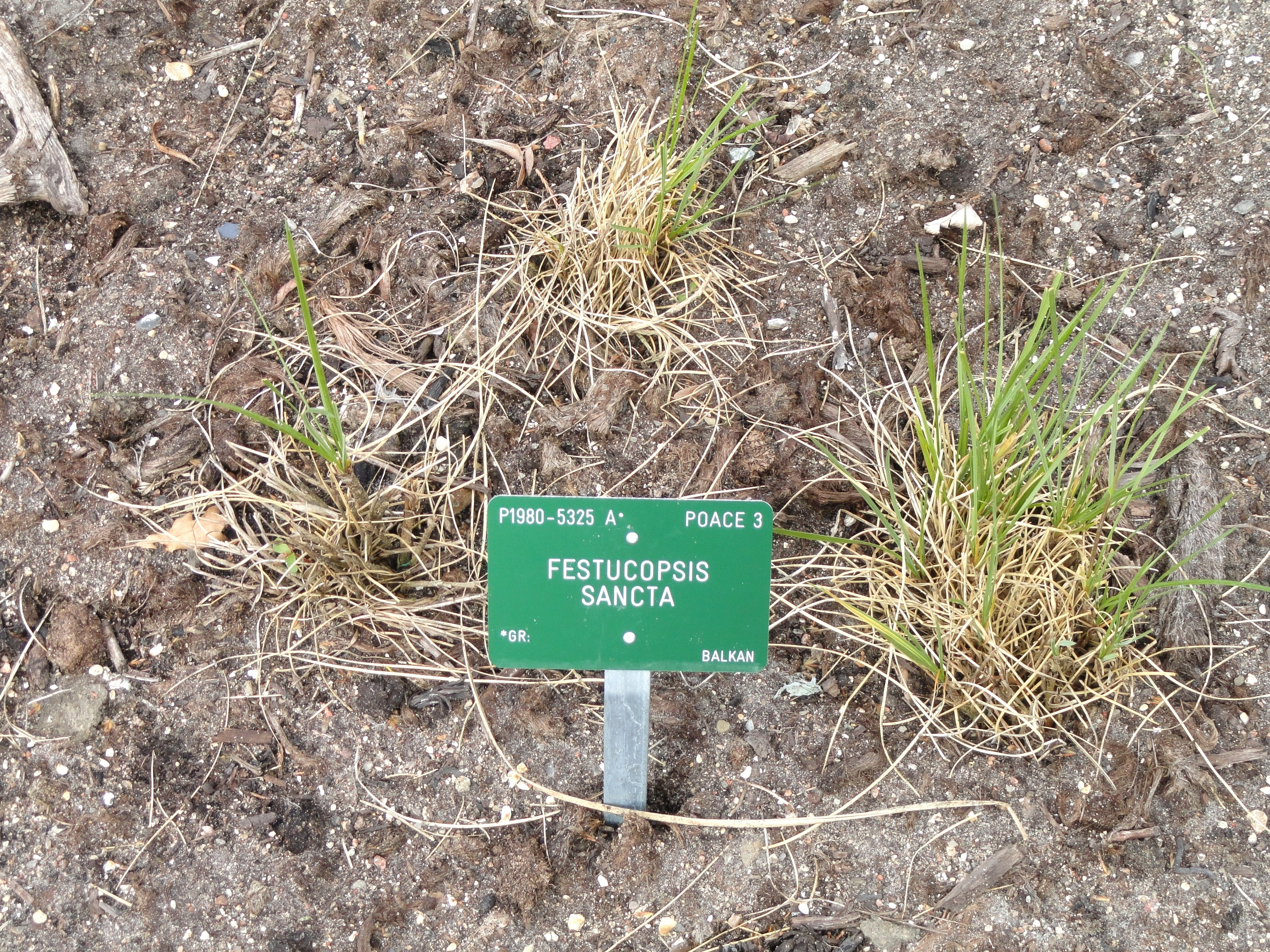

Scientific classification
- Kingdom: Plantae
- Clade: Tracheophytes
- Clade: Angiosperms
- Clade: Monocots
- Clade: Commelinids
- Order: Poales
- Family: Poaceae
- Subfamily: Pooideae
- Genus: Peridictyon; Seberg, Fred. & Baden
- Species: P. sanctum

Binomial name
- Peridictyon sanctum (Janka) Seberg, Fred. & Baden

Synonyms
- Agropyron sanctum (Janka) Hack.; Brachypodium sanctum (Janka) Janka; Festuca sancta Janka; Festucopsis sancta (Janka) Melderis; Triticum sanctum (Janka) F.Herm.

= Peridictyon =

Genus of grasses

Peridictyon is a genus of grass with a single species, Peridictyon sanctum, native to southern Bulgaria and northern Greece.

== Taxonomy ==
When the genus name Peridictyon was published in 1991, the authors cited the type as the combinatio nova Peridictyon sanctum (Janka) Seberg, Fred. & Baden, based on Festuca sancta Janka. The description provided in the original publication of F. sancta includes remarks about finding the species, and describes a few of its features, but does not list any characters that would distinguish it from other species in the genus Festuca. The Index Nominum Genericorum has judged this to mean that Festuca sancta was a nomen nudum, and hence Peridictyon was not a validly published name. Other sources disagree; the International Plant Names Index states that the descriptive characters given are sufficient for the publication of the species name Festuca sancta.

The genus is placed in the tribe Triticeae.

== See also ==
- List of Balkan endemic plants
