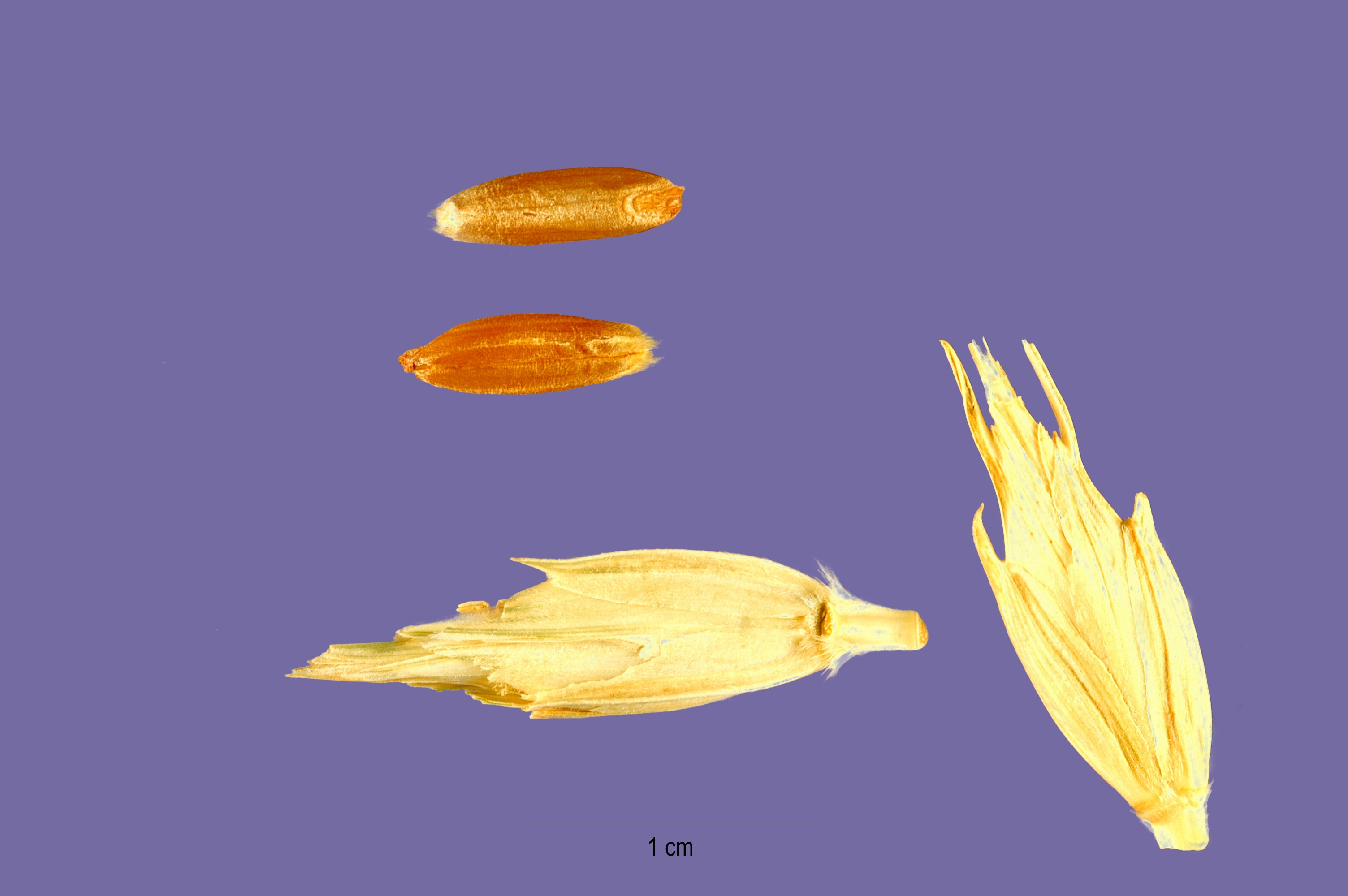
- Triticum zhukovskyi

Scientific classification
- Kingdom: Plantae
- Clade: Tracheophytes
- Clade: Angiosperms
- Clade: Monocots
- Clade: Commelinids
- Order: Poales
- Family: Poaceae
- Subfamily: Pooideae
- Genus: Triticum
- Species: T. zhukovskyi

Binomial name
- Triticum zhukovskyi Menabde & Erizin

= Triticum zhukovskyi =

Species of grass

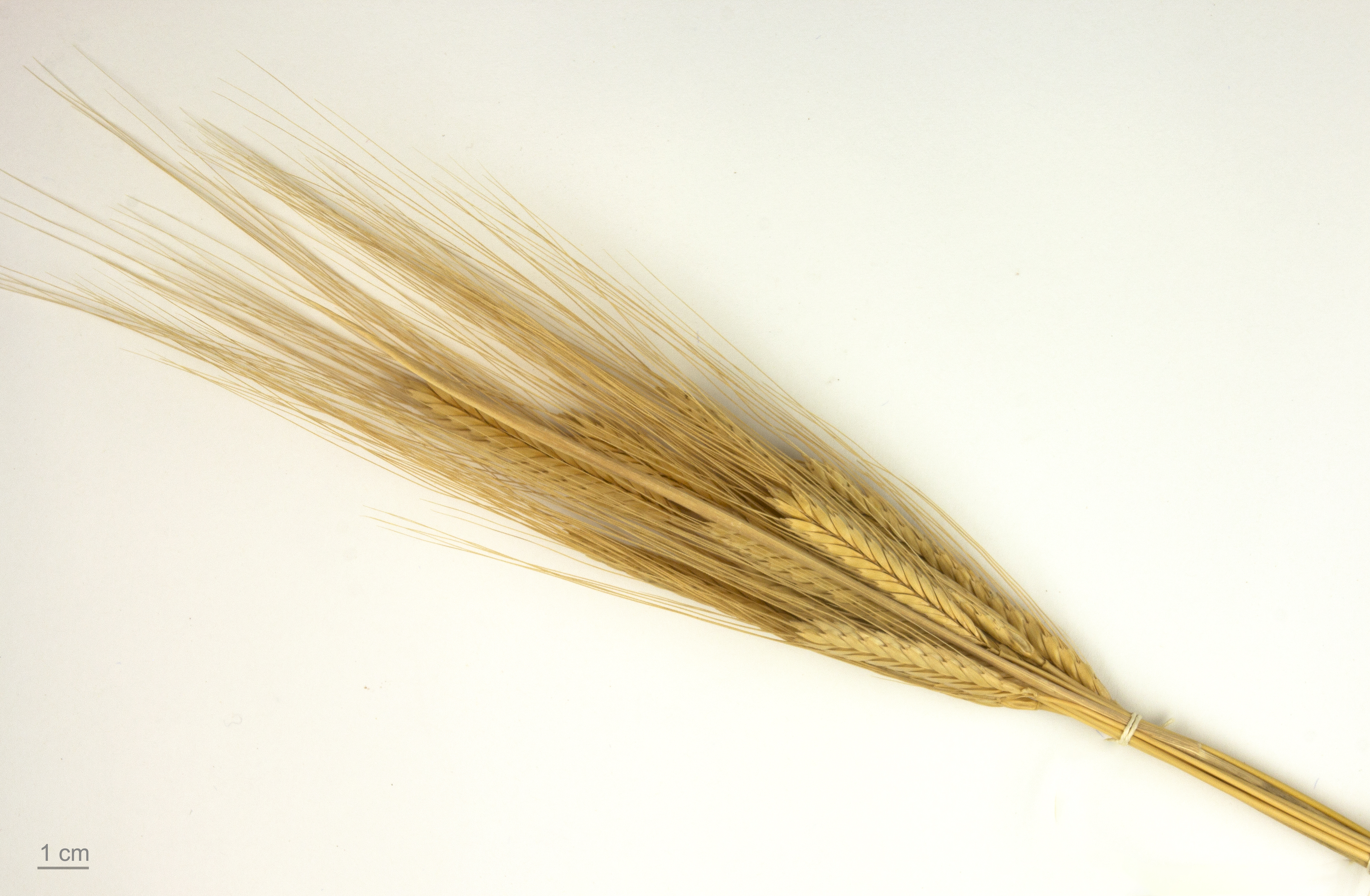
Triticum zhukovskyi (MHNT)

Triticum zhukovskyi, or Zhukovsky's wheat, is a hexaploid wheat, very closely resembling the Triticum timopheevii, a tetraploid variety of wheat. T. zhukovskyi was first observed in Western Georgia in close proximity to Triticum timopheevii and Triticum monococcum and is believed to be an amphiploid arising from the cross of T. timopheevii and T. monococcum.
