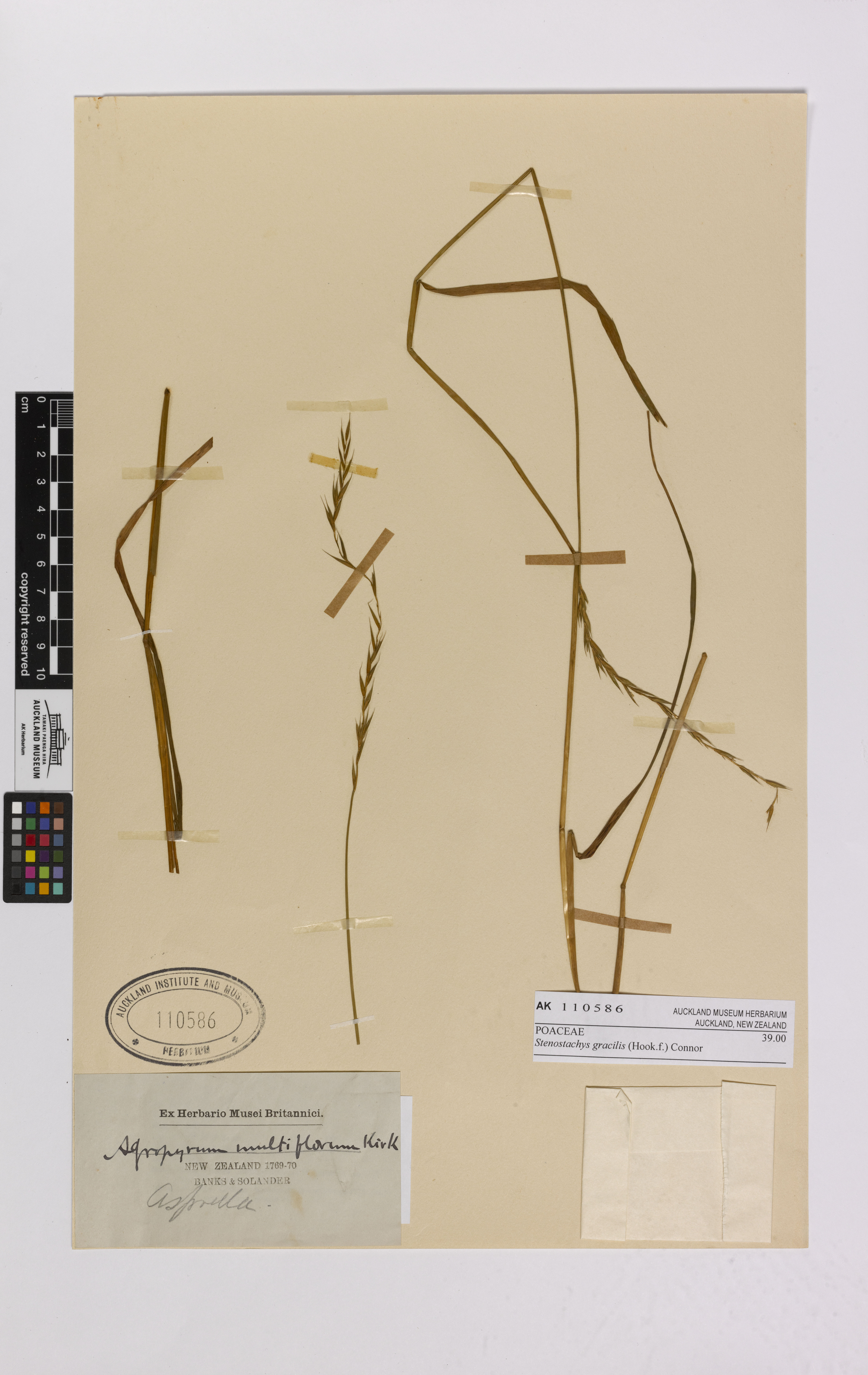
- Stenostachys gracilis

Scientific classification
- Kingdom: Plantae
- Clade: Tracheophytes
- Clade: Angiosperms
- Clade: Monocots
- Clade: Commelinids
- Order: Poales
- Family: Poaceae
- Subfamily: Pooideae
- Supertribe: Triticodae
- Tribe: Triticeae
- Genus: Stenostachys; Turcz.

Type species
- Stenostachys narduroides (syn of Stenostachys gracilis) Turcz.

= Stenostachys =

Genus of grasses

Stenostachys is a genus of plants in the grass family, found only in New Zealand. It is sometimes included in the genus Elymus.

Species

- Stenostachys deceptorix Connor - South Island
- Stenostachys enysii (Kirk) Barkworth & S.W.L.Jacobs - South Island
- Stenostachys gracilis (Hook.f.) Connor - North Island + South Island
- Stenostachys laevis (Petrie) Connor - North Island + South Island
