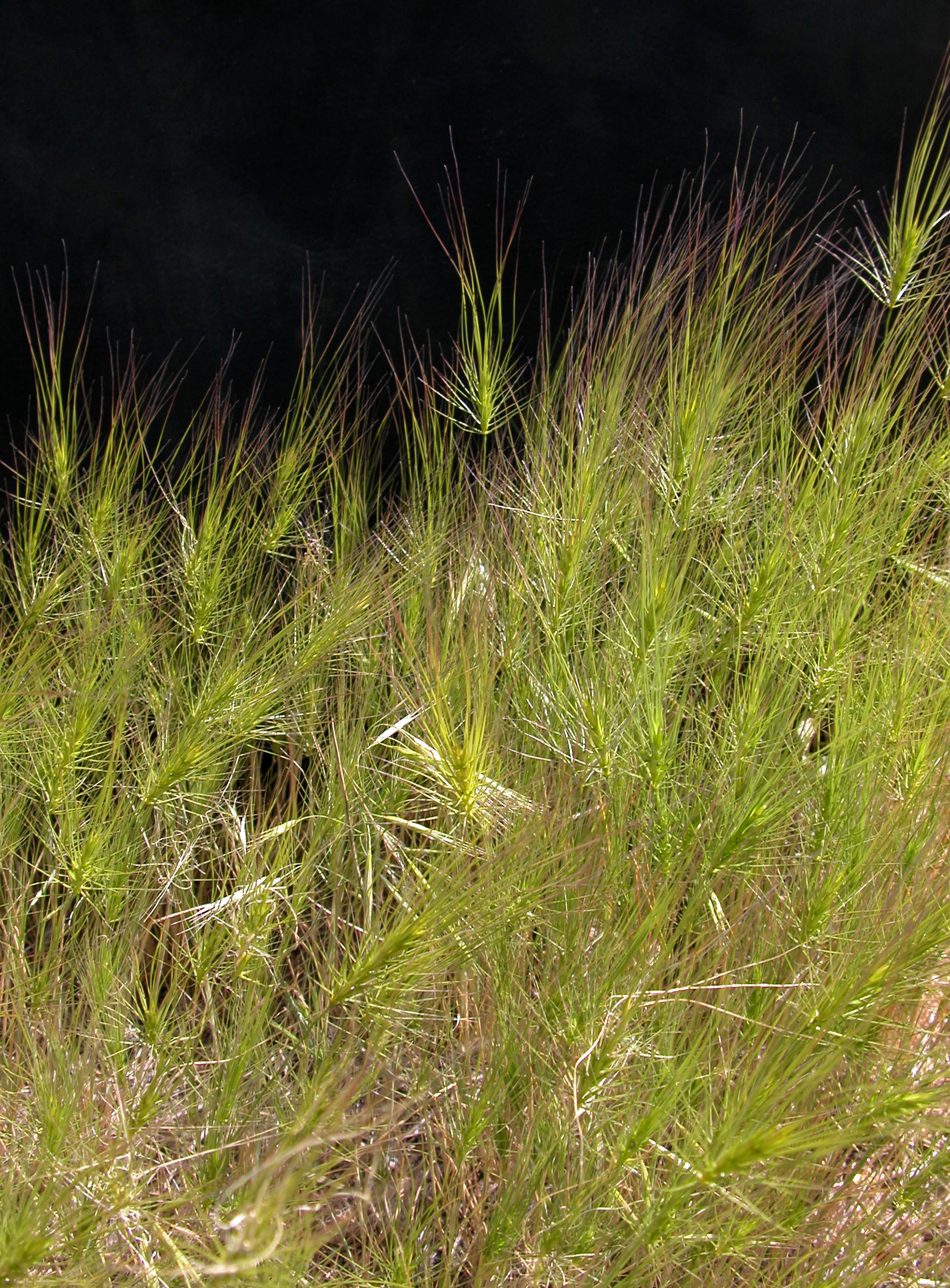

Scientific classification
- Kingdom: Plantae
- Clade: Embryophytes
- Clade: Tracheophytes
- Clade: Spermatophytes
- Clade: Angiosperms
- Clade: Monocots
- Clade: Commelinids
- Order: Poales
- Family: Poaceae
- Subfamily: Pooideae
- Tribe: Triticeae
- Genus: Taeniatherum; Nevski
- Species: T. caput-medusae

Binomial name
- Taeniatherum caput-medusae (L.) Nevski

Synonyms
- List: Elymus caput-medusae L.; Hordeum caput-medusae (L.) Coss. & Durieu; Leptothrix caput-medusae (L.) Dumort.; Cuviera caput-medusae (L.) Simonk.; Hordelymus caput-medusae (L.) Pignatti; Taeniatherum crinitum var. caput-medusae (L.) Wipff; Elymus crinitus Schreb.; Hordeum crinitum (Schreb.) Desf.; Elymus montanus Pall. ex Georgi; Elymus intermedius M.Bieb.; Elymus platatherus Link; Leptothrix crinita (Schreb.) Dumort.; Elymus caput-medusae var. crinitus (Schreb.) Ball; Hordeum oligostachyum Flatt; Cuviera caput-medusae var. aspera Simonk.; Hordeum intermedium (M.Bieb.) Hausskn.; Hordeum intermedium var. intercedens Hausskn.; Hordeum asperum (Simonk.) Degen; Hordeum caput-medusae subsp. asperum (Simonk.) Asch. & Graebn.; Hordeum bobartii Asch. & Graebn.; Cuviera aspera (Simonk.) Simonk.; Elymus caput-medusae var. asper (Simonk.) Halácsy; Cuviera bobartii (Asch. & Graebn.) Podp.; Cuviera crinita (Schreb.) Podp.; Taeniatherum asperum (Simonk.) Nevski; Taeniatherum crinitum (Schreb.) Nevski; Elymus caput-medusae subsp. crinitus (Schreb.) Maire; Hordelymus asper (Simonk.) Beldie; Hordelymus caput-medusae subsp. asper (Simonk.) Pignatti; Hordelymus caput-medusae subsp. crinitus (Schreb.) Pignatti; Taeniatherum caput-medusae var. crinitum (Schreb.) Humphries; Taeniatherum caput-medusae subsp. asper (Simonk.) Melderis; Taeniatherum caput-medusae subsp. crinitum (Schreb.) Melderis

= Taeniatherum =

Medusahead

Genus of grasses

Taeniatherum is a genus of Eurasian and North African plants in the grass family.

The only recognized species is medusahead (Taeniatherum caput-medusae) which is native to southern and central Europe (from Portugal to European Russia), North Africa (Algeria, Morocco, Tunisia), and Asia (from Turkey and Saudi Arabia to Pakistan and Kazakhstan). It is also naturalized in southern Australia, Chile, and parts of North America.

This aggressive winter annual grass is changing the ecology of western rangelands in North America. It was first observed in the United States in Oregon in 1903 by Thomas Howell. Forty-eight percent of the total land area of the United States is rangeland, pastureland, national parks, nature preserves, and other wildlands. These lands are essential for agriculture and for protecting the integrity of ecological systems. Natural areas contain many nonnative plant species that occur as self-sustaining populations in the continental United States, including medusahead. As of 2005, medusahead infested approximately 972,700 acres (3,936 km^{2}) in the 17 western states (from North Dakota south to Texas and west to the Pacific coast), and spreads at an average rate of 12% per year. As medusahead spreads, it can outcompete native vegetation in overgrazed rangelands, reduces land value, and creates a wildfire hazard.

== History and origin ==
Medusahead was first described Elymus caput-medusae by Carl Linnaeus. Nevski recommended in 1934 that the Russian types of medusahead should be classified in a separate genus, Taeniatherum. In the 1960s, it was suggested by Jack Major of the University of California that there are three geographic and morphologically distinct taxa: T. caput-medusae, T. asperum, and T. crinitum. After traveling in Russia, Major thought the proper classification for the plant introduced to North America was Taeniatherum asperum. The genus was revised in 1986 by the Danish scientist Signe Frederiksen. He made the previously mentioned distinct taxa into subspecies of Taeniatherum caput-medusae.

The subspecies caput-medusae is a native species to Europe, and is mostly restricted to Spain, Portugal, southern France, Algeria, and Morocco. Subspecies crinitum is found from Greece and the Balkans east into Asia, and the range of subspecies asperum completely overlaps the other two subspecies.

In Asia, medusahead is widespread in Turkmenistan, Iran, Syria, and in the northern portion of Israel, inhabiting low mountains and plateau areas. It is both an agronomic and rangeland weed. It prefers soils rich in nitrogen, and is often found on stony or gravelly soils. Carbonized seeds of this weed have been found in early agricultural archaeological sites in Iran. Seeds were first found in strata corresponding to the early days of sheep and goat husbandry.

== Life cycle and growing habits ==
Medusahead is a winter annual, germinating in the fall and undergoing root growth in the winter and early spring. Since its roots develop early and reach deep in the soil, it outcompetes native plants for moisture. It flowers in early spring, and by June or July its seeds, which are covered with tiny barbs, are mature. The barbs help the seeds attach to livestock, humans or vehicles that pass by. As the grass grows it accumulates silica, making it unpalatable to livestock except for early in its life cycle. It creates a dense layer of litter, and because of the silica content, the litter decomposes more slowly than that of other plants. This litter suppresses native plant growth while encouraging the germination of its own seed, and after a few years it creates an enormous load of dry fuel that can lead to wildfires.

Stands of medusahead vary in density from several hundred to 2,000 plants per square foot. This variance is directly related to annual precipitation, soil type, and other vegetation in the area. Research has suggested that medusahead is highly adaptable and can produce more seeds at a density of one plant per square foot than 1,000 plants per square foot. Since it matures later than most other annuals, it is easy to identify as it is often bright green when the other annuals are brown. As it matures, it turns shades of purple and eventually tan. This unique phenological signature can be utilized in the management of this invasive species. A recently developed method of assessing greenness in aerial color infrared (CIR) imagery using Normalized Difference Vegetation Index (NDVI) values to differentiate between medusahead and other more desirable species may help land managers determine where control methods are necessary.

Medusahead seeds disperse relatively short distances and dispersal decreases as distance from the plant increases. Seeds are very well adapted for dispersal by adhesion to moving objects. The relatively long period of medusahead seed dispersal from July to October may be an adaptation to increase the likelihood of adhesion to animals.

== Identification ==
Medusahead ranges in height from 20 to 60 centimeters. It has slender, weak stems that often branch at the base. It has spike inflorescences similar to those of wheat or rye. The lemmas have long awns and the glumes have shorter ones, giving the seed head a layered look. As the awns dry, they twist and spread in all directions, similar to the snake-covered head of the mythological Medusa. The barbs on the awns help the seed drive into the soil. The grainlike seed may remain viable in the soil for a number of years.

== Effects on wildlife and grazing ==
The grazing capacity of land infested with medusahead can be reduced by up to 80%. Wildlife habitat and biodiversity also suffer, and the weed can eventually lead to alterations in ecosystem functions. The impact medusahead can have on species relying on sagebrush is rarely mentioned. It can exacerbate the decline of sage-grouse (genus Centrocercus) as it replaces plant communities that provide critical habitat for the bird.

Other species, such as mule deer and chukar partridges, tend to avoid areas overrun with medusahead because it is not a good food source. In the case of mule deer, a study in Oregon found that even though extensive stands of medusahead were available, those areas (when compared to other plant communities) were least preferred by feeding mule deer in winter, summer, and fall; and they ranked low in the spring. This decrease in feeding was related back to the dominance of medusahead, which deer do not eat, and the subsequent lack of forbs. Chukar partridges will ingest medusahead seeds (caryopses ) if given no other choice. However, if they are given free access to all the medusahead seeds they will eat, they suffered from a significant loss in body weight. Largely undamaged seeds were found in their droppings, suggesting that the digestibility of medusahead by the birds was low.

== Control methods ==
No single control method will eradicate medusahead. For best results, it is often necessary use a form of integrated pest management that combines two or more of the following methods.

=== Mechanical ===
Plowing and disking are two methods of mechanical control. Both methods can effectively control medusahead and can reduce infestation by 65% to 95% the next growing season. Eradication of medusahead by mechanical control by itself is nearly impossible, but when followed by chemical control or revegetation chances for eradication increase dramatically.

=== Burning ===
Fire is often considered a low cost method of improving rangeland condition. It has been given attention in the control of medusahead because many of the areas infested with it are too rocky or steep for other treatments. Control of medusahead with fire had differing results in California. In some areas, more desirable plant communities came back after a fire, while in other areas medusahead continued to dominate after fire. There are a few guidelines that should be followed when burning medusahead. The burn should be conducted when the seed is in the soft dough stage (when the seeds exude a milky substance when squeezed) in the late spring. The initial fire should be one that is slow burning, something that is easily achieved by burning into the wind. This prevents the fire from advancing too rapidly and ensures that the current year's herbage is burned and periods of maximum temperature are long enough to kill medusahead caryopses. Viable medusahead caryopses are found almost entirely in the litter and on the soil surface.

Past studies on the effectiveness of burning may have given researchers false hope. The caryopses have severe temperature dependent afterripening requirements which prevent seeds from germinating at temperatures above 10˚C for about 180 days after maturity. If these conditions are met, many medusahead caryopses from the litter and soil in burned plots were viable. Since the seeds did not germinate during the afterripening period, researchers were misled into believing they were accomplishing more by burning than was actually the case.

=== Chemical ===
Chemical control can be effective if used in conjunction with other control methods. Glyphosate (Roundup) applied at 0.375 lbs/acre in the early spring before seeds are produced can provide good results. This timing will also limit the damage to nontarget species that develop later in the growing season. Research suggests that burning before chemical application is more effective than chemicals alone. In the late 1960s, a study was conducted that determined the effectiveness of paraquat on medusahead control in different areas of the United States. This study found that paraquat was effective in controlling medusahead in California, but did not suppress the grass in Reno, Nevada. This was significant because it determined that there was no effective herbicide for the simultaneous spraying and reseeding of medusahead infestations.

=== Biological ===
Medusahead was found to be susceptible to certain root rot fungi including crown rot and take-all, but it was not susceptible to barepatch, browning root rot, and common root rot. The diseases did not reduce the overall weight of the roots, but take-all significantly reduced the overall dry weight of the aboveground shoots. Soil-borne pathogens can have a severe effect on grasses as long as the environmental conditions for the diseases are optimized. Take-all is associated with plants growing in high soil moisture, and like crown rot, it affected medusahead. In contrast, crown rot had the greatest impact on water-stressed plants and therefore may be an effective biological control of grassy weeds in the arid regions of the western U.S. It is also promising because it did not have a significant negative impact on desirable grasses such as western wheatgrass.

=== Grazing ===
Grazing alone is not a good method of medusahead control. For best results, grazing is used as part of an integrated program. It is an efficient management tool as long as the timing and duration of grazing are controlled properly. For example, if grazing is carried out in conjunction with revegetation, the desirable grasses must be established before the grazing can take place, otherwise the revegetation will be futile. In areas where desirable grasses have completed their life cycle by the winter or early spring, grazing during this time can help reduce medusahead. It should still be in a vegetative stage and therefore more palatable to livestock. Grazing in the late spring, summer, and fall is not recommended because it will give medusahead a competitive advantage as cattle graze species other than medusahead. If livestock grazing is a method used to control mature stands of medusahead, the livestock must be moved to a holding area for 10 days to two weeks and fed weed-free feed before they are moved to weed-free areas. This will prevent the seeds that pass through the animals from germinating in areas that are free of medusahead.

== Restoration ==
Revegetation should be a part of any medusahead management plan. If medusahead is not first controlled, reseeding an infested area will not be successful. The existing medusahead has to be controlled and especially not allowed to produce more seed, and the seed bank in the soil also has to be reduced. This usually takes two or three years, depending on soil moisture and growing conditions. After this, seedling of desirable species can become established. Combining a tillage treatment followed by herbicide is most effective in controlling the weed and promoting desirable plant growth. Squirreltail, bluebunch wheatgrass, crested wheatgrass, intermediate wheatgrass, Thurber's needlegrass, needle and thread, Indian ricegrass, sandberg bluegrass, and sheep fescue are all competitive grasses that work well when renovating an area previously infested with medusahead in the western United States.

== Prevention ==
Since medusahead seeds are often spread by adhering to humans, animals, and vehicles, it is recommended to restrict these kinds of traffic in infestations to prevent the spread of medusahead. Narrow containment zones of around 3 meters would successfully suppress the invasion of medusahead to surrounding areas.

Plant communities that have high densities of large perennial bunchgrasses are more resistant to medusahead invasion, so managing rangelands to promote and maintain large perennial bunchgrasses is critical to prevent the spread of medusahead. This will reduce the establishment of new infestations, but successful management will also require searching for and eradicating new infestations. Controlling new infestations is more effective, and often more feasible, than trying to control large infestations.

Even if attempts to prevent and control new infestations are not entirely successful, these efforts will slow the rate of spread and give researchers and land managers more time to develop better prevention, restoration, and control methods. Also, slowing the rate of invasion helps promote rangeland health and productivity in areas that are most at risk of invasion. Without an active prevention program, this weed will continue to spread and increase its negative ecological and economical impacts. Managing medusahead may seem expensive per acre, but when all the acres that are protected by managing an infestation are considered, the price is very reasonable. And, when taking into account the rising land prices, the cost of medusahead management to the individual livestock producer is rapidly becoming more reasonable compared to purchasing additional acreage to offset production losses from medusahead invasion.
