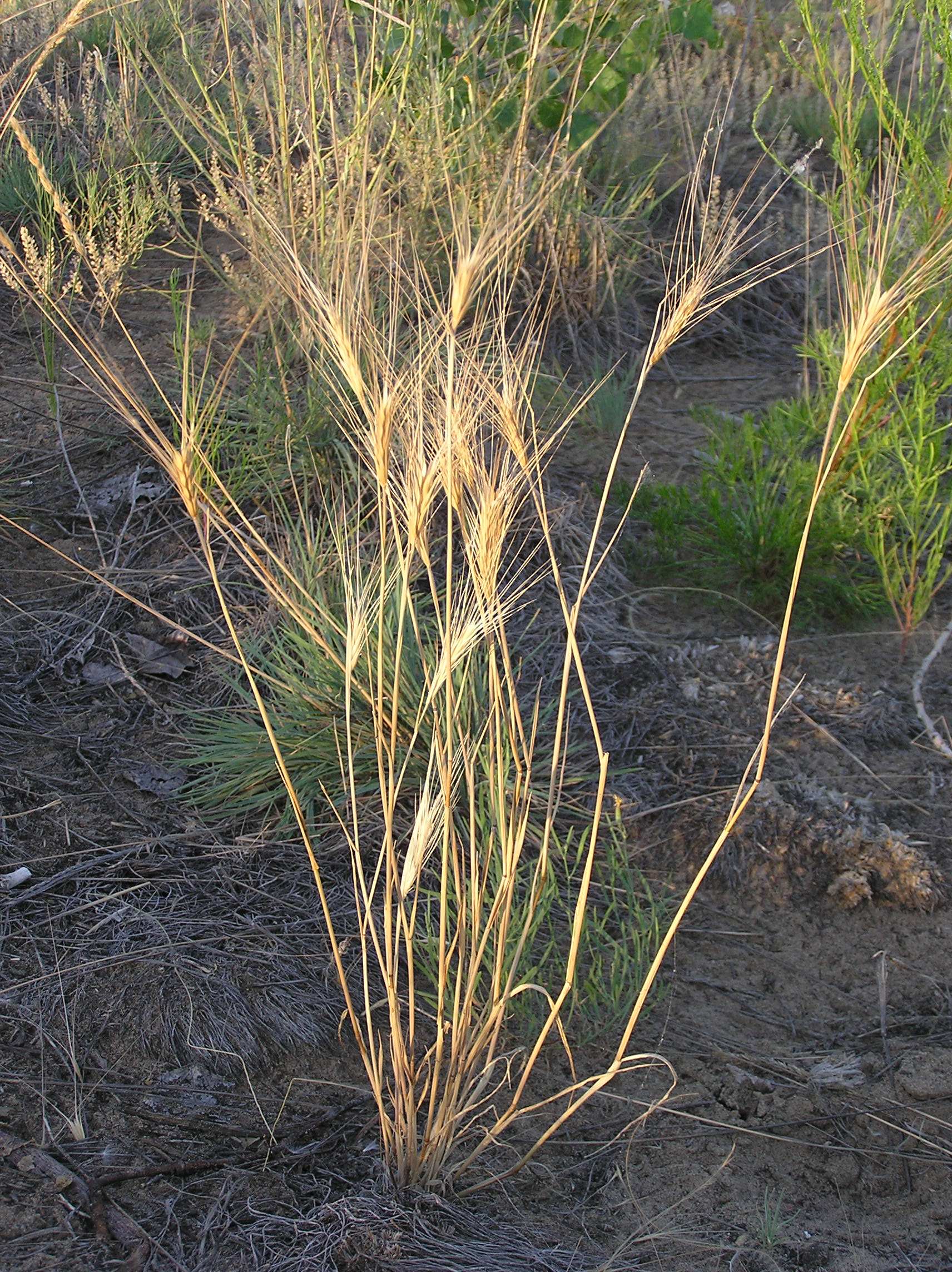

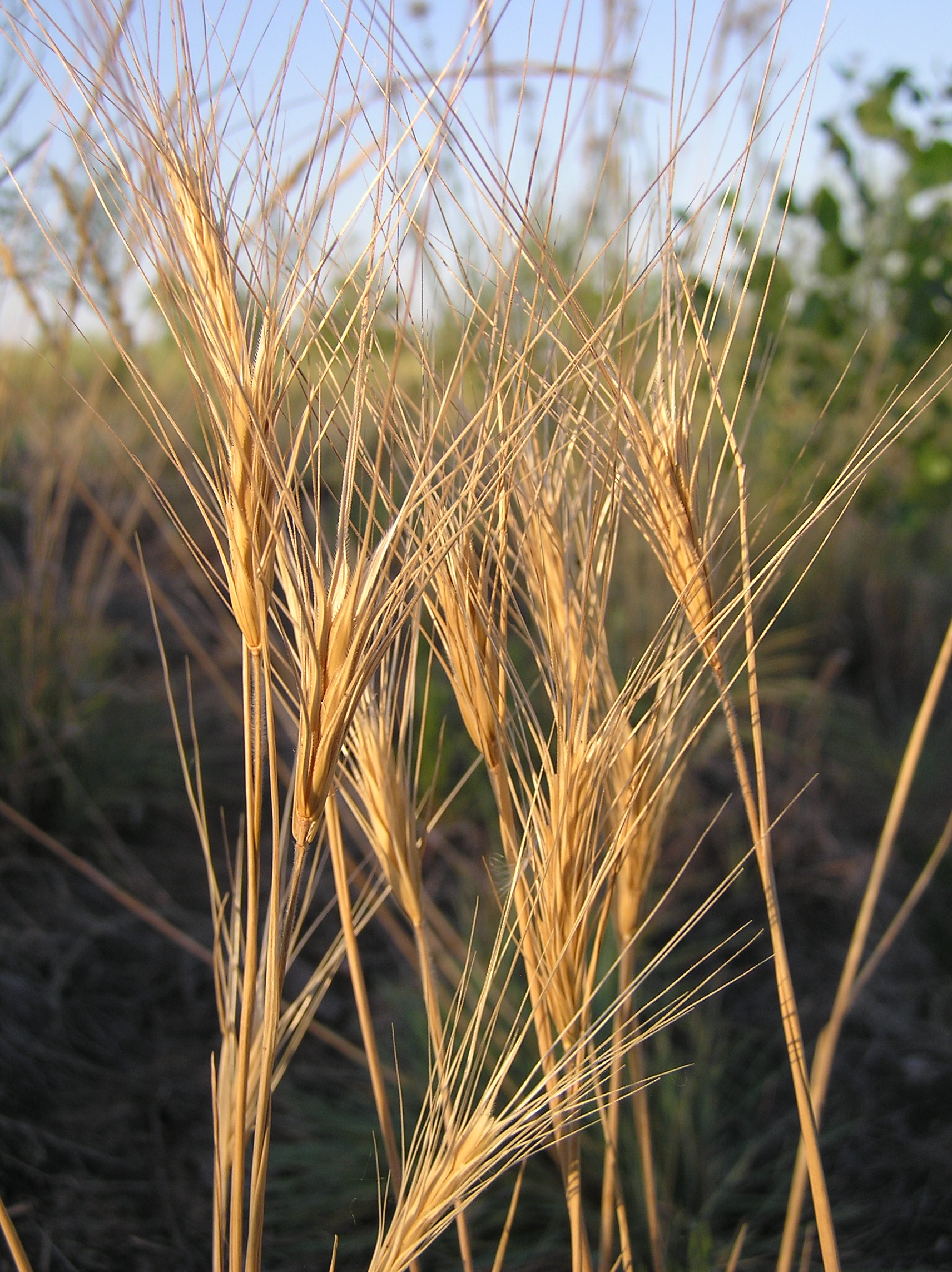

Scientific classification
- Kingdom: Plantae
- Clade: Tracheophytes
- Clade: Angiosperms
- Clade: Monocots
- Clade: Commelinids
- Order: Poales
- Family: Poaceae
- Subfamily: Pooideae
- Genus: Secale
- Species: S. sylvestre

Binomial name
- Secale sylvestre Host

= Secale sylvestre =

Species of plant

Secale sylvestre is a wild relative of rye (S. cereale).

== Breeding ==
Secale sylvestre is useful for wheat breeding. This includes disease resistance breeding.

== Genomics ==
Secale sylvestre is the source of PmSESY, a disease resistance gene for wheat powdery mildew. He et al., 2021 use genetic mapping to locate PmSESY on the 1RL chromosome.
